= × Pachyveria 'Powder Puff' =

Hybrid succulent cultivar

'Powder Puff' is a hybrid succulent plant from the Pachyphytum cross Echeveria genus, × Pachyveria. 'Powder Puff' is derived from Echeveria cante and Pachyphytum oviferum. It was created in the 1970s.
