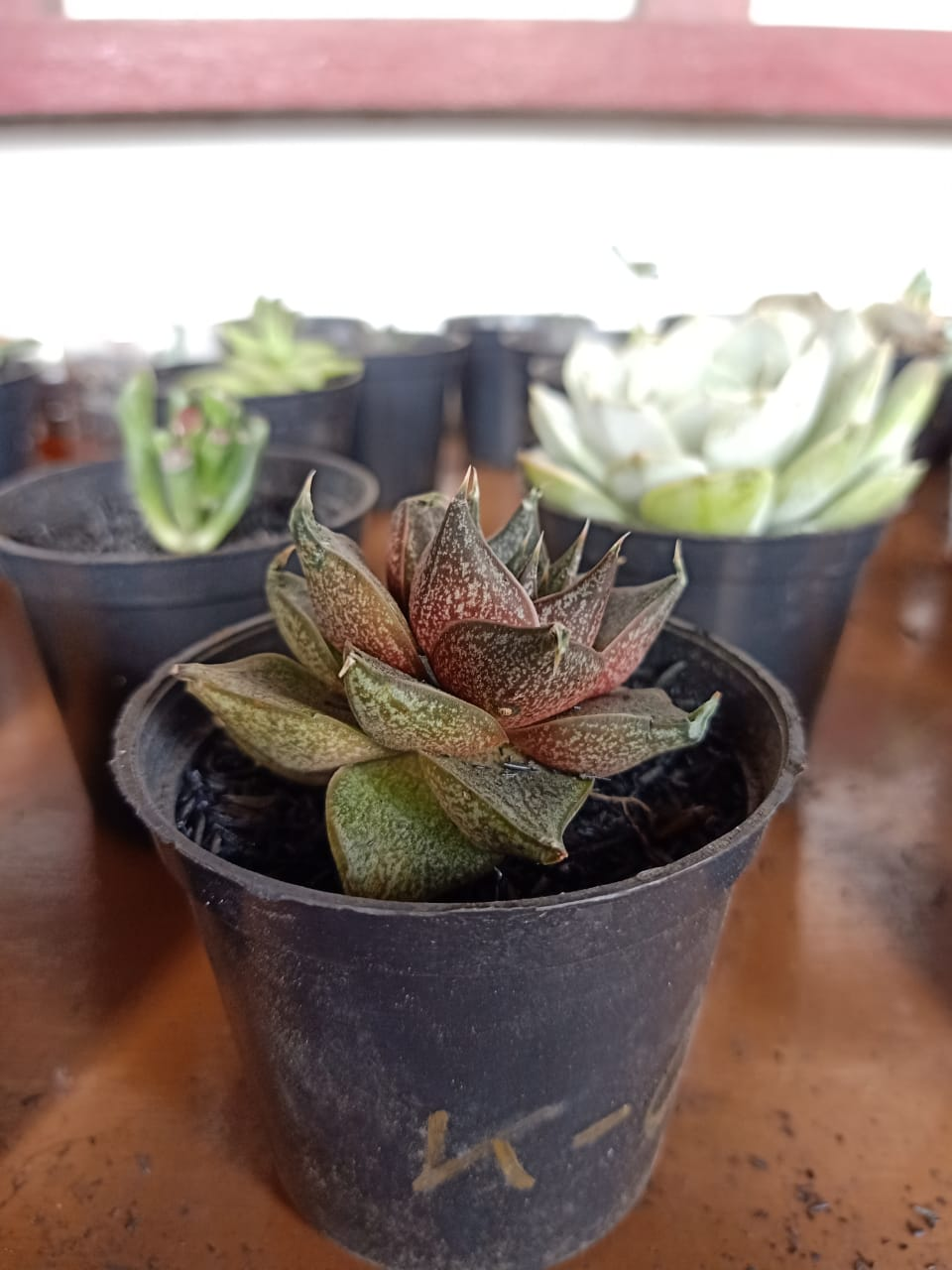

Scientific classification
- Kingdom: Plantae
- Clade: Tracheophytes
- Clade: Angiosperms
- Clade: Eudicots
- Order: Saxifragales
- Family: Crassulaceae
- Genus: Echeveria
- Species: E. purpusiorum

Binomial name
- Echeveria purpusiorum A. Berger

Synonyms
- Urbinia purpusii Rose

= Echeveria purpusorum =

Species of succulent

Echeveria purpusiorum is a species of flowering plant in the family Crassulaceae, endemic to Puebla and Oaxaca, Mexico.

== Description ==
Echeveria purpusiorum have pointy, oval, and thick leaves with about 1.6 inches (41 mm) long and 1 inch (25 mm) wide. The leaves color is deep olive-green, grey-green, or white-green, with red-brown markings. The rosette slowly grows up to 3.2 inches (81 mm) tall and 3.2 inches (81 mm) in diameter. The flowers color is scarlet red, with yellow tips and bloom in late-spring with 12 inches (300 mm) long stem.
