= Echeveria atropurpurea =

Scientific classification
- Kingdom: Plantae
- Clade: Embryophytes
- Clade: Tracheophytes
- Clade: Spermatophytes
- Clade: Angiosperms
- Clade: Eudicots
- Order: Saxifragales
- Family: Crassulaceae
- Genus: Echeveria
- Species: E. atropurpurea

Binomial name
- Echeveria atropurpurea (Baker) E.Morren

Synonyms
- Cotyledon atropurpurea Baker; Echeveria sanguinea E.Morren

Species of plant

Echeveria atropurpurea is a species of succulent plant in the Crassulaceae family. It is a perennial commonly known as chapetona or siempreviva, and is endemic to Central Veracruz, Mexico in tropical deciduous forests. It is noted for its fast growing, easy cultivation, and red to yellow flowers. It is currently threatened by habitat loss.

== Description ==
It stands roughly 77 cm tall with 7-21 cm rosette-shaped leaves that may range in coloration from green to purple. Its flowers (appearing Nov-Feb) have a dark green base with corolla pink-orange (salmon) to deep red/orange petals. It has numerous brown seeds.

== Taxonomy ==
Echeveria is named for Atanasio Echeverría y Godoy, a botanical illustrator who contributed to Flora Mexicana.

Atropurpurea means "dark-purple coloured". This name is ostensibly due to its purple leaves and bracts.
