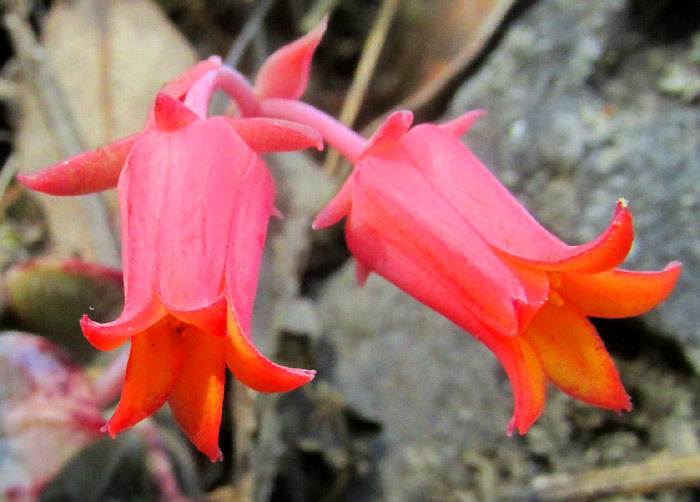
- Echeveria halbingeri flowers
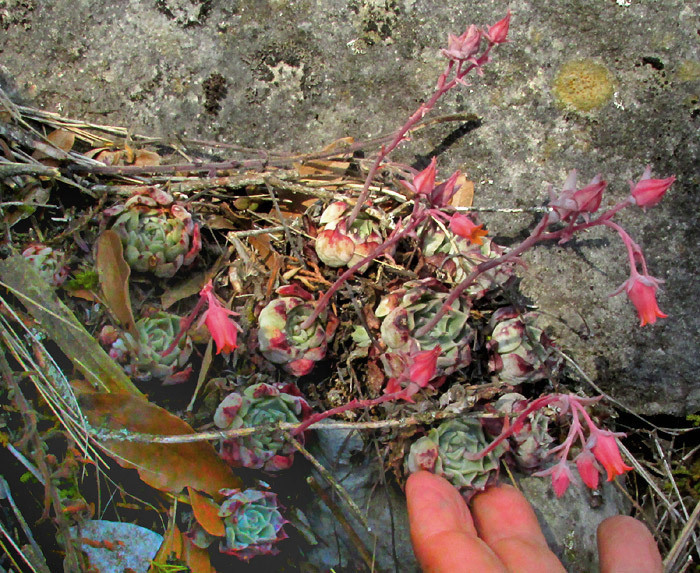
- Echeveria halbingeri plants

Scientific classification
- Kingdom: Plantae
- Clade: Embryophytes
- Clade: Tracheophytes
- Clade: Angiosperms
- Clade: Eudicots
- Order: Saxifragales
- Family: Crassulaceae
- Genus: Echeveria
- Species: E. halbingeri

Binomial name
- Echeveria halbingeri E. Walther

= Echeveria halbingeri =

Species of flowering plant

Echeveria halbingeri is a succulent perennial herb in the family Crassulaceae, native to a small part of the central Mexican highlands.

== Description ==
Despite its small distribution area, Echeveria hyalina is a favorite of many growers of succulent plants. Often it is sold commercially under the name of Mexican Snowball. Plant growers especially appreciate its small size and its coloring; its leaves are covered in a sort of delicately opaque, gray-greenish hue tinged with pink-purplish along the edges.

== Habitat ==
In the wild, Echeveria halbingeri occurs on rocky slopes in poor soil, and on and around rocks.

== Distribution ==
Echeveria hyalina is known to occur naturally only in the central highland mountains of the Mexican states of Hidalgo, Querétaro and Veracruz.
