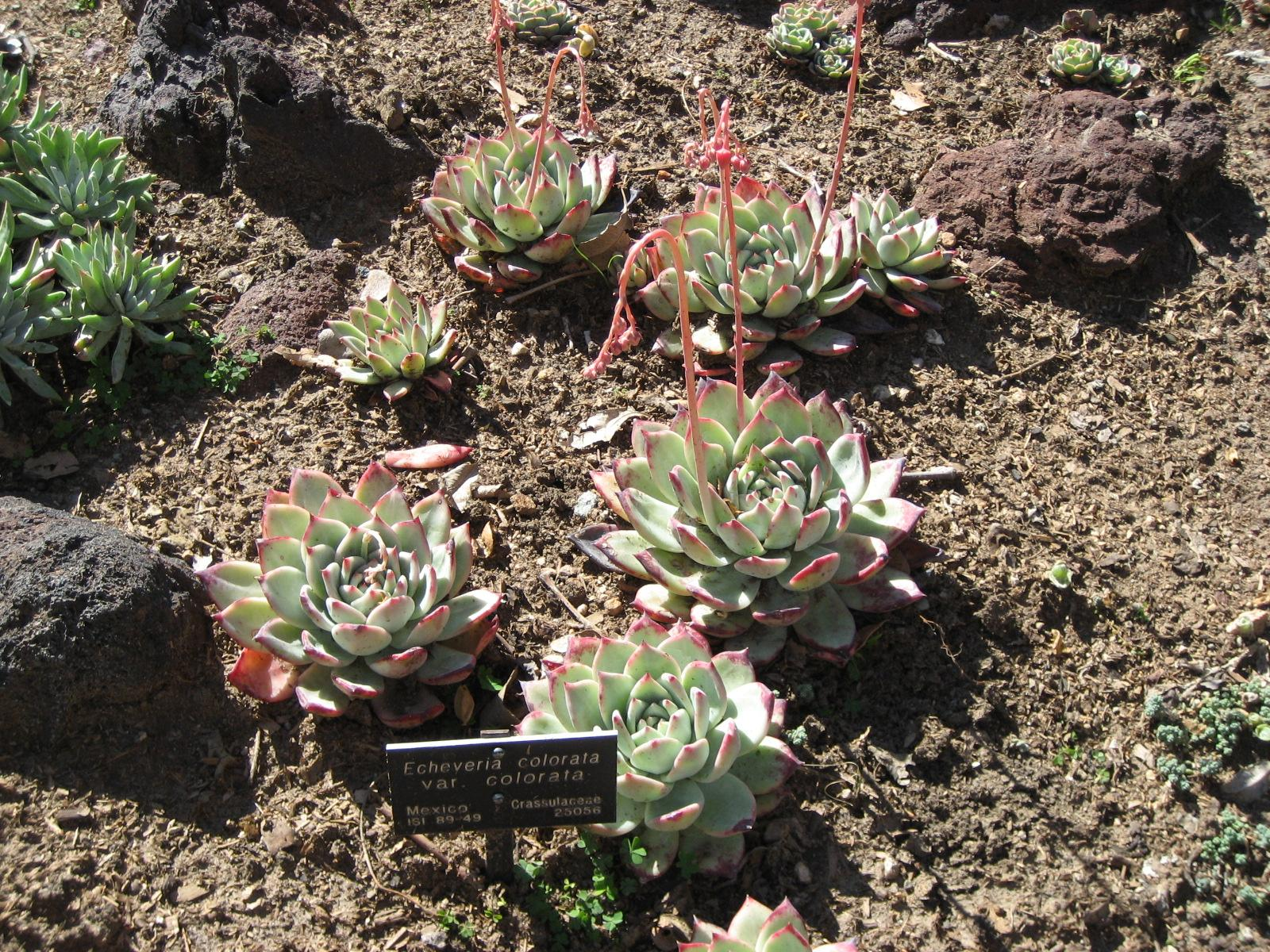
- E. colorata, Huntington Botanical Garden

Scientific classification
- Kingdom: Plantae
- Clade: Embryophytes
- Clade: Tracheophytes
- Clade: Angiosperms
- Clade: Eudicots
- Order: Saxifragales
- Family: Crassulaceae
- Genus: Echeveria
- Species: E. colorata

Binomial name
- Echeveria colorata E.Walther

= Echeveria colorata =

Species of succulent flowering plant

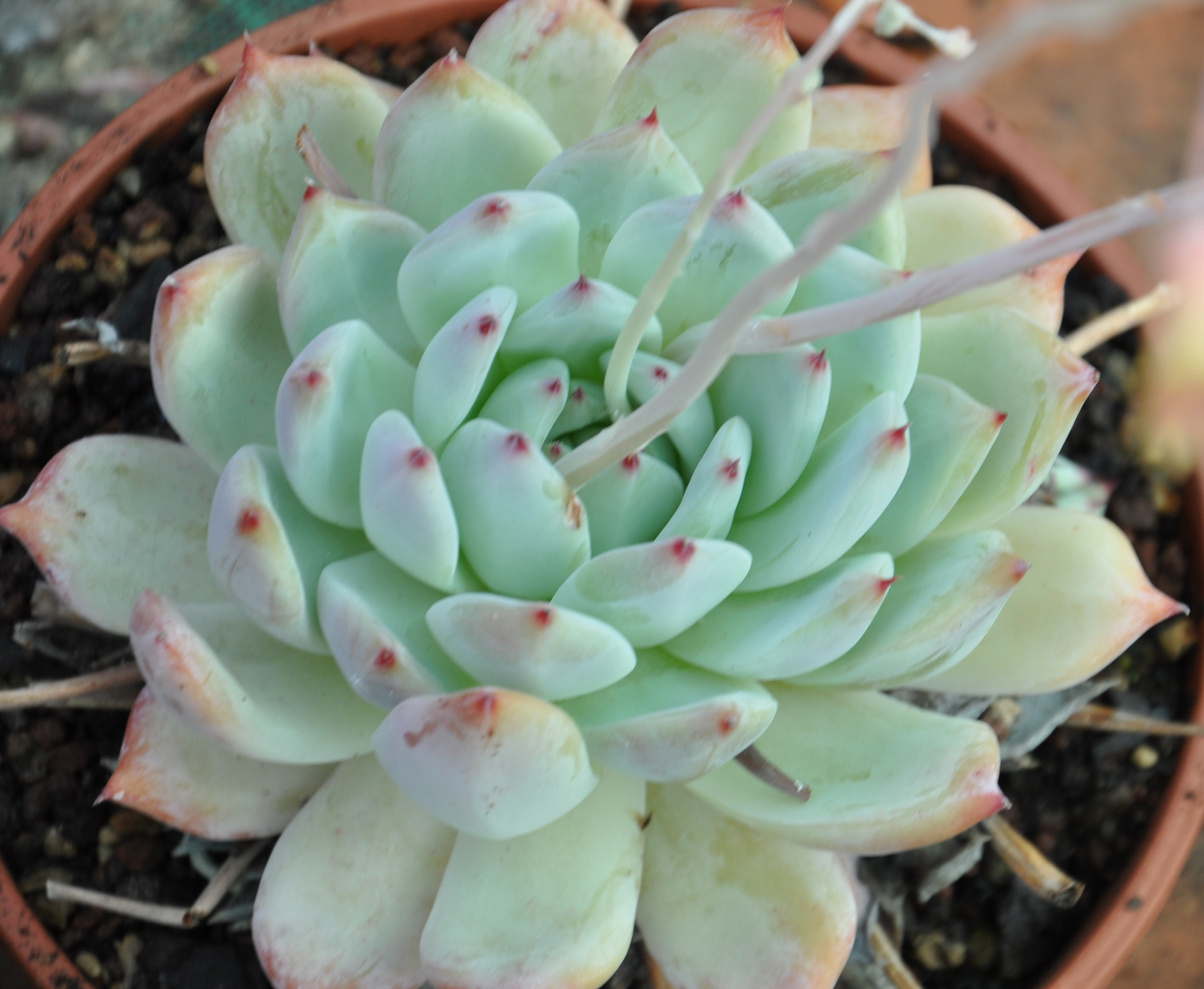
Close up of a rosette

Echeveria colorata, is a species of flowering plant in the family Crassulaceae, endemic to Mexico.

== Description ==
Echeveria colorata is an evergreen perennial succulent, with a rosette of fleshy leaves growing up to 40 centimetres (16 in) in diameter.

== Taxonomy ==
Synonym:

- Echeveria lindsayana Walther 1972

Forms:

- Echeveria colorata f. brandtii

Cultivars:

- Echeveria colorata 'Haage'
- Echeveria colorata 'Mexican Giant'

Hybrids:

- Echeveria 'Beatrice'
- Echeveria 'Frank Reinelt'
- Echeveria 'Laulindsa'
- Echeveria 'Margaret Martin'
- × Graptoveria 'Opalina'

== Cultivation ==
Echeveria colorata is cultivated as an ornamental plant for rock gardens and as a potted plant.

In cooler temperate regions, it must be kept indoors for the winter, as it does not tolerate temperatures of −4 °C (25 °F) and below. Optimum growing temperature 23 °C to 25 °C. In Australia the summer temperatures can reach above 40 °C so protection will be required. Either move into a more shaded position or shade cloth covering of 70%.

== Etymology ==
Echeveria is named for Atanasio Echeverría y Godoy, a botanical illustrator who contributed to Flora Mexicana.

Colorata means 'colored'.
