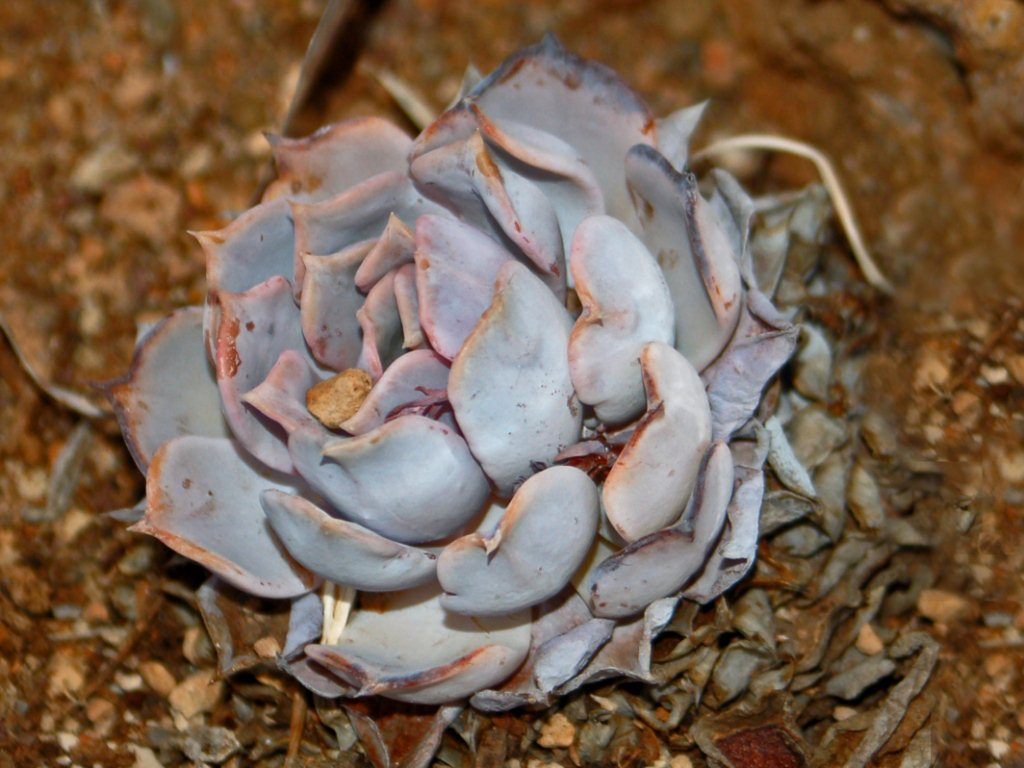
- Echeveria lilacina at the botanical garden of Villa Durazzo-Pallavicini, Genova Pegli

Scientific classification
- Kingdom: Plantae
- Clade: Tracheophytes
- Clade: Angiosperms
- Clade: Eudicots
- Order: Saxifragales
- Family: Crassulaceae
- Genus: Echeveria
- Species: E. lilacina

Binomial name
- Echeveria lilacina Kimn. & Moran

= Echeveria lilacina =

Species of succulent

Echeveria lilacina, common name ghost echeveria or Mexican hens and chicks, is a species of succulent plants in the genus Echeveria belonging to the family Crassulaceae.

== Description ==
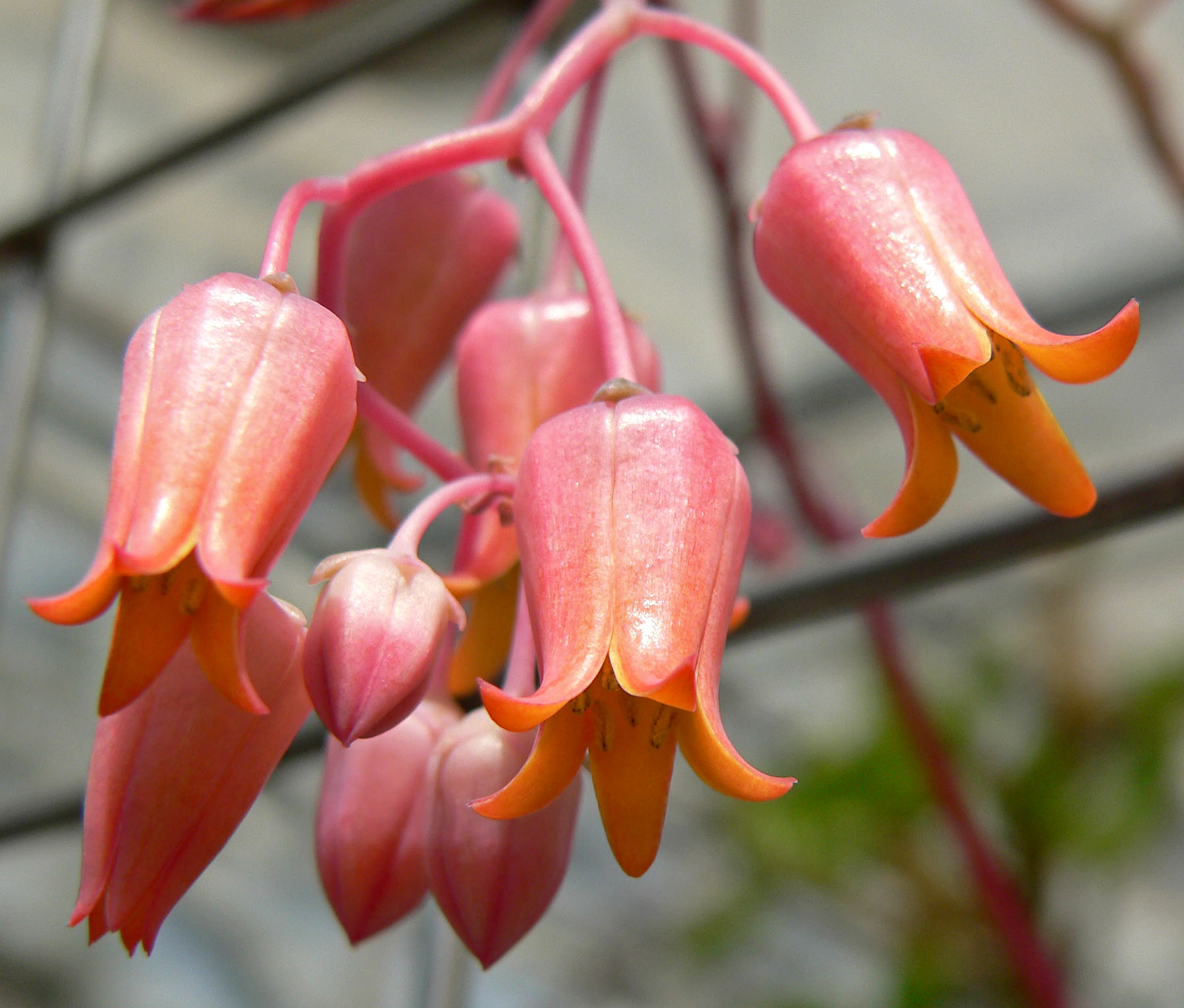
Flowers of Echeveria lilacina

Echeveria lilacina can reach a height of about 15 cm. The leaves are silvery-grey, spoon shaped, fleshy and arranged in a symmetrical rosette of 12–25 cm of diameter. This species is slow growing and drought-tolerant. Flowers are pale pink or coral-colored. They emerge on small short arching racemes on the top of reddish stems of about 15 cm. Flowering period extends from later winter to early spring.

== Distribution ==
This species is native to Nuevo Leon, in northern Mexico.

== Habitat ==
Echeveria lilacina grows on rocky areas at quite high elevations.

== Cultivation ==
Echeveria lilacina is cultivated as an ornamental plant, for use in gardens, and as a potted plant.

== Etymology ==
The genus name Echeveria was given in honor of the 18th century Mexican botanist and painter Atanasio Echeverría y Godoy, famous for his paintings of plants, many of which were included in Flora Mexicana.

lilacina means 'lilac-colored'.
