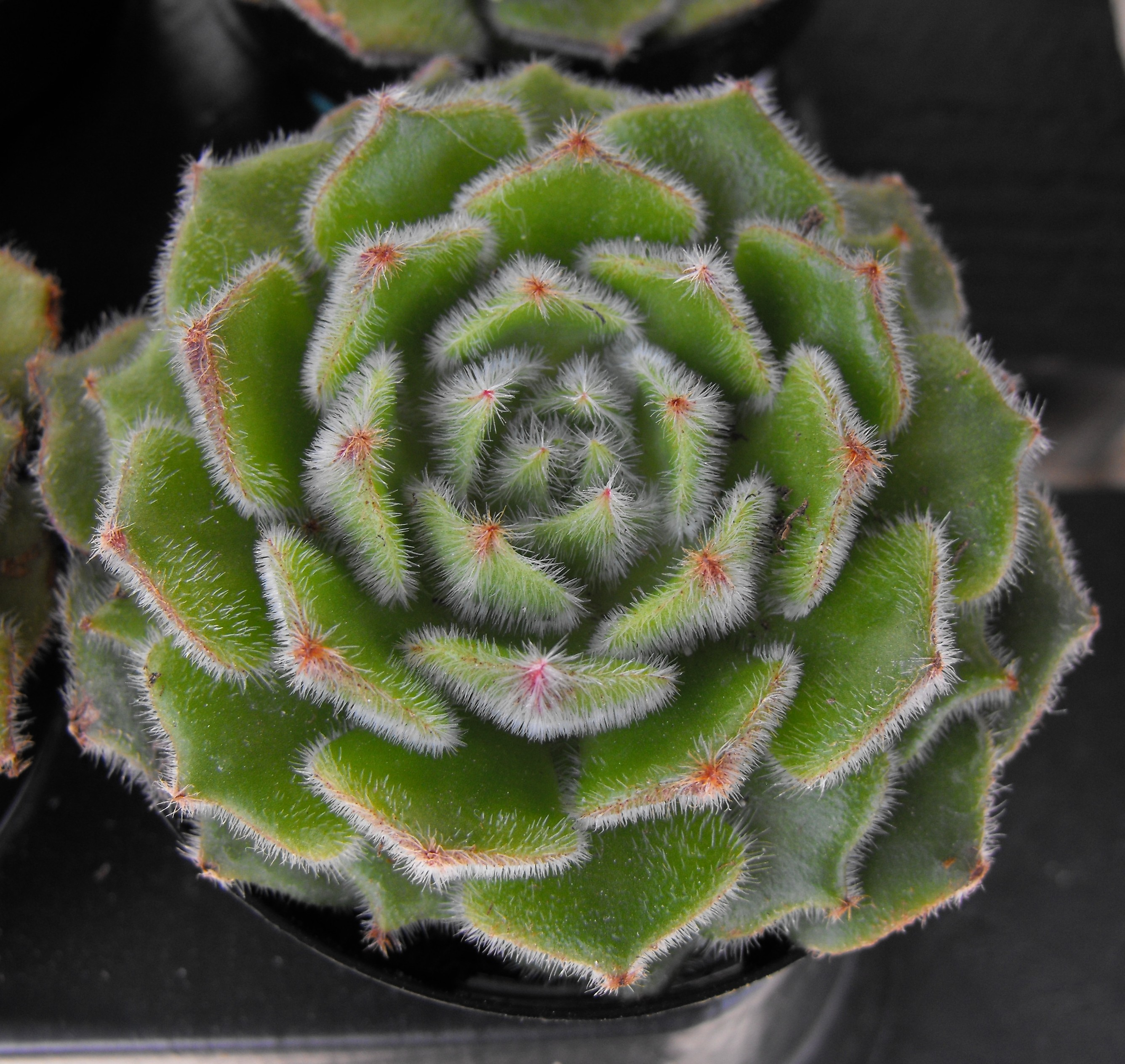
- Echeveria setosa var. ciliata

Scientific classification
- Kingdom: Plantae
- Clade: Tracheophytes
- Clade: Angiosperms
- Clade: Eudicots
- Order: Saxifragales
- Family: Crassulaceae
- Genus: Echeveria
- Species: E. setosa

Binomial name
- Echeveria setosa Rose & Purpus

= Echeveria setosa =

Species of succulent

Echeveria setosa, the Mexican fire cracker, is a species of flowering plant in the family Crassulaceae, native to semi-desert areas of Mexico and common throughout Puebla.

== Description ==
Echeveria setosa is an evergreen succulent growing to 4 cm (2 in) high by 30 cm (12 in) wide, with spherical rosettes of fleshy spoon-shaped leaves covered in white hairs. These white hairs, known as glochids, can cause irritation to the skin if touched. In spring it bears 30 cm (12 in) long stalks of red flowers with yellow tips.

== Taxonomy ==
- Echeveria setosa var. ciliata (Moran) Moran 1993
- Echeveria setosa var. deminuta J. Meyrán 1989
- Echeveria setosa var. minor Moran 1993
- Echeveria setosa var. oteroi Moran 1993
- Echeveria setosa var. setosa

== Cultivation ==
Echeveria setosa is cultivated as an ornamental plant. It is grown outside in subtropical climates, such as Southern California. As it requires a minimum temperature of 7 °C (45 °F), it must be grown under glass with heat in colder temperate regions. It can be placed outside during the summer months.

== Etymology ==
Echeveria is named for Atanasio Echeverría y Godoy, a botanical illustrator who contributed to Flora Mexicana.

Setosa means 'covered with stiff, bristly hairs'.
