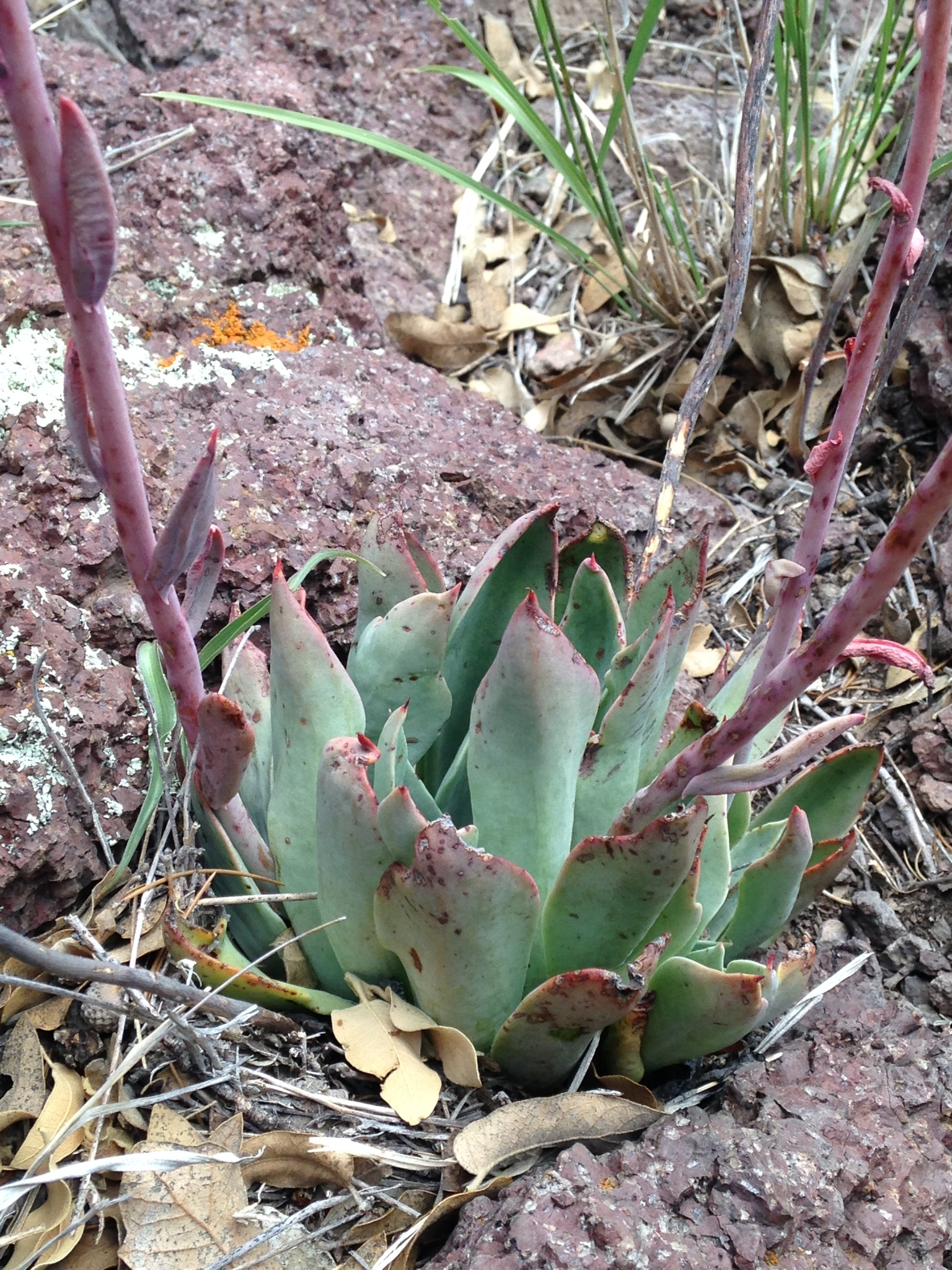

Scientific classification
- Kingdom: Plantae
- Clade: Tracheophytes
- Clade: Angiosperms
- Clade: Eudicots
- Order: Saxifragales
- Family: Crassulaceae
- Genus: Echeveria
- Species: E. strictiflora

Binomial name
- Echeveria strictiflora A. Gray

= Echeveria strictiflora =

Species of succulent

Echeveria strictiflora, the desert savior, is a species of flowering plant in the family Crassulaceae, native to southwestern Texas and to the Chihuahuan Desert of northeast Mexico. Its range consists of several scattered populations, rather than a contiguous range.

== Description ==
Rosettes of this succulent perennial can reach up to 10 cm in diameter, but they are usually smaller.

Leaves: Range in color from glaucous to brownish green or green, and some Mexican populations of the plant have red leaf margins.

Inflorescences: Reaching 20–25 cm in height, with flowers in shades of pink or orange.

== Cultivation ==
Benefits from scant water during the cooler winter months and higher levels of water during the warmer growing season.

== Etymology ==
Echeveria is named for Atanasio Echeverría y Godoy, a botanical illustrator who contributed to Flora Mexicana.
