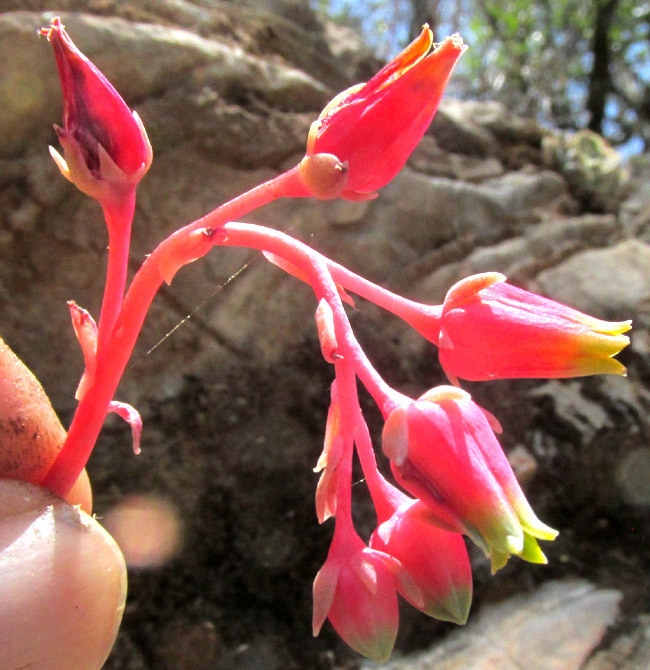

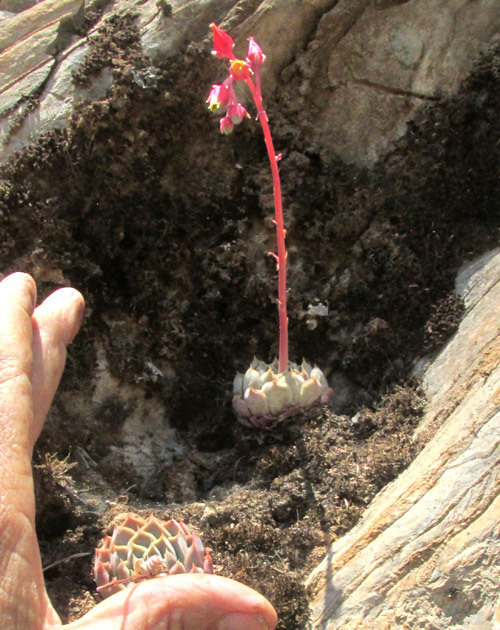

Scientific classification
- Kingdom: Plantae
- Clade: Tracheophytes
- Clade: Angiosperms
- Clade: Eudicots
- Order: Saxifragales
- Family: Crassulaceae
- Genus: Echeveria
- Species: E. hyalina

Binomial name
- Echeveria hyalina E.Walther

= Echeveria hyalina =

Succulent perennial herb

Echeveria hyalina is a succulent perennial herb in the family Crassulaceae, naturally occurring only in the highlands of central Mexico.

== Description ==
Echeveria hyalina has a limited habitat in upland central Mexico, where it is natively found; the succulent can be found outside of this region as a garden plant. Growers appreciate its compact rosette shape, grayish-green leaves, and its ease of care. Various horticultural forms have been developed altering the natural plant's appearance.

== Habitat ==
In the wild, Echeveria hyalina grows on rocky slopes in oak and coniferous forests, and subalpine meadows, at elevations between 1800 and 3400 meters (5900 to 11,150 feet).

== Taxonomy ==
In 2025, Plants of the World Online regarded the name Echeveria elegans var. simulans as a synonym of Echeveria hyalina. However, the equally authoritative GBIF accepted both the names Echeveria hyalina and Echeveria simulans,. The iNaturalist website recognized the taxa as separate. Other resources express various opinions. When the taxa are considered to be separate, both occur only in Mexico, but show different distribution areas.

== Distribution ==
When considered distinct from Echeveria simulans, Echeveria hyalina occurs naturally only in the central highland mountains of the Mexican states of Guanajuato, Hidalgo and Querétaro.
