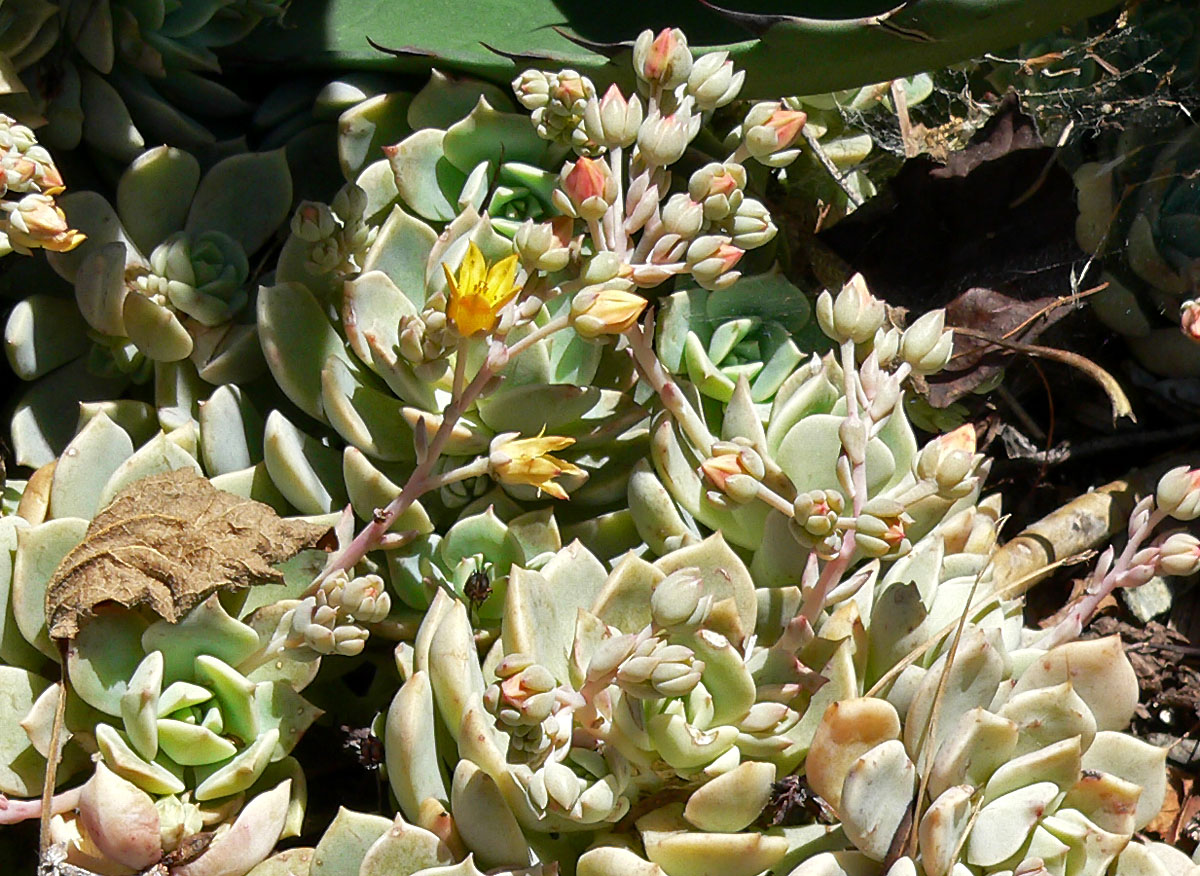
- Echeveria multicaulis

Scientific classification
- Kingdom: Plantae
- Clade: Tracheophytes
- Clade: Angiosperms
- Clade: Eudicots
- Order: Saxifragales
- Family: Crassulaceae
- Genus: Echeveria
- Species: E. multicaulis

Binomial name
- Echeveria multicaulis Rose

= Echeveria multicaulis =

Species of succulent

Echeveria multicaulis (also known as copper leaf and copper rose) is a species of plant native to Mexico. It is a member of the genus Echeveria.

== Etymology ==
Echeveria is named for Atanasio Echeverría y Godoy, a botanical illustrator who contributed to Flora Mexicana.

Multicaulis literally translates to 'many-stemmed', a reference to its growth habit.
