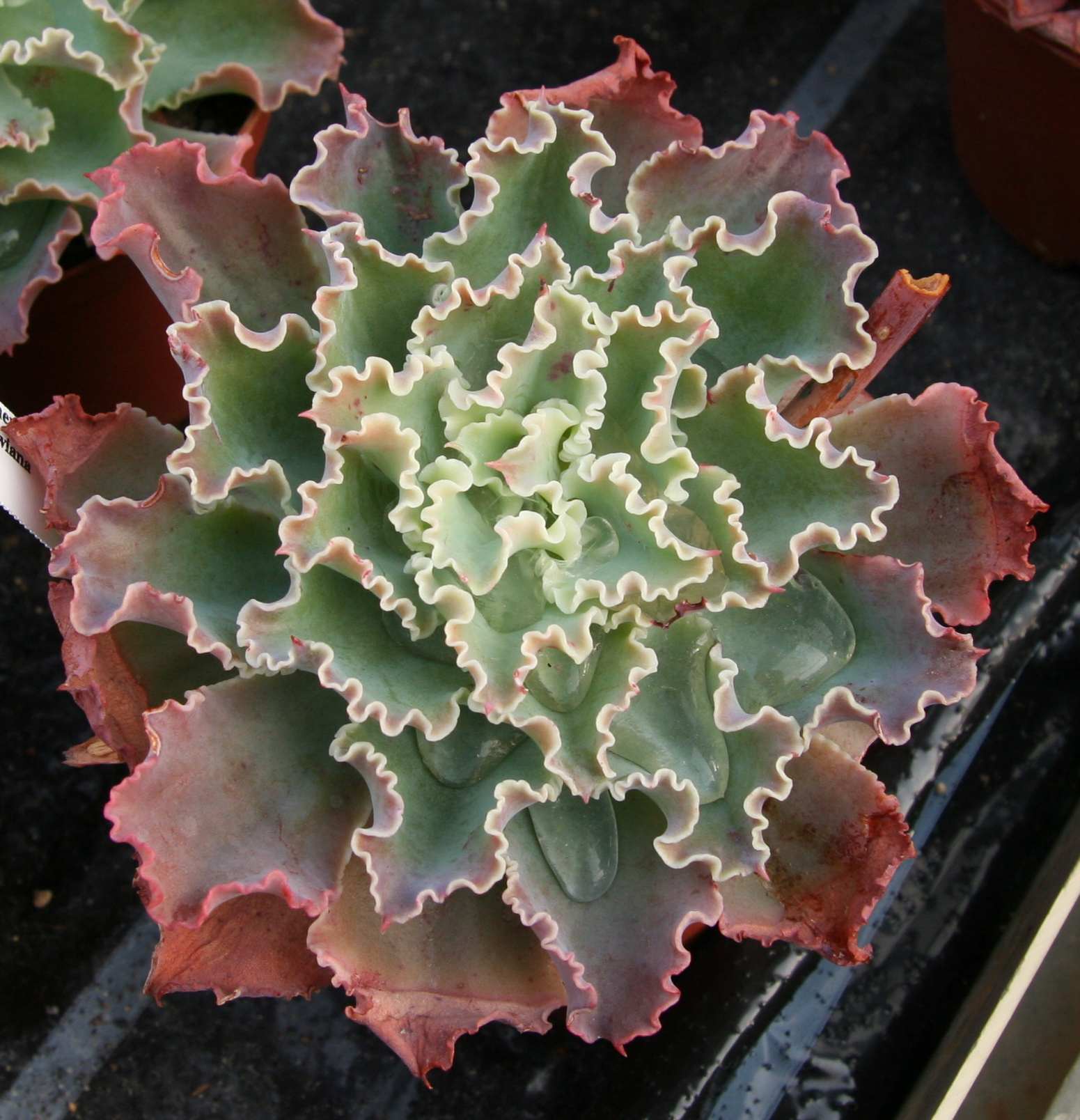
- A frilled specimen
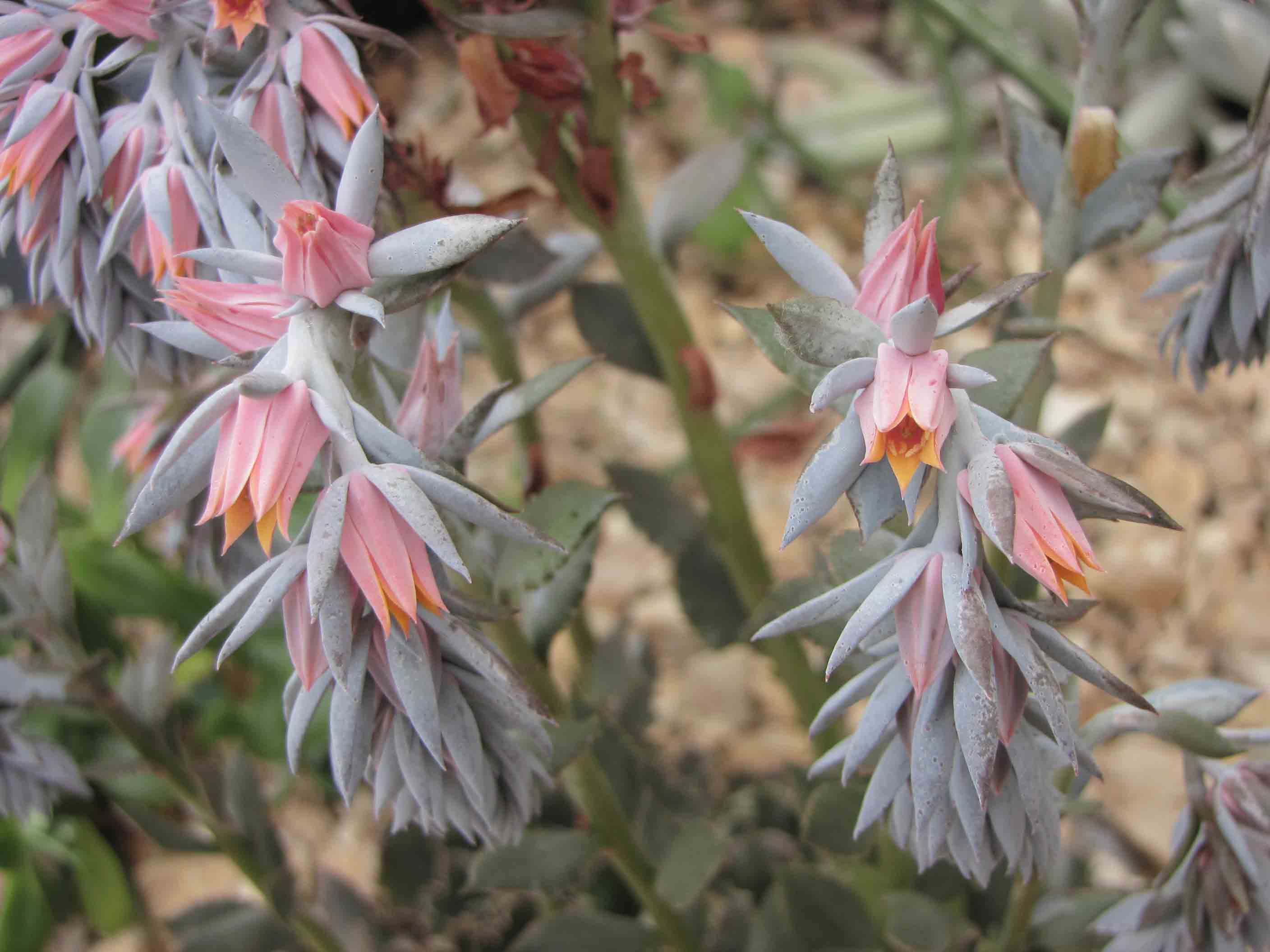
- Flowers

Scientific classification
- Kingdom: Plantae
- Clade: Embryophytes
- Clade: Tracheophytes
- Clade: Angiosperms
- Clade: Eudicots
- Order: Saxifragales
- Family: Crassulaceae
- Genus: Echeveria
- Species: E. shaviana

Binomial name
- Echeveria shaviana E.Walther

= Echeveria shaviana =

Species of flowering plant

Echeveria shaviana, called Mexican hens or Mexican hens and chicks, is a species of flowering plant in the family Crassulaceae, native to northeastern Mexico. A succulent, it has gained the Royal Horticultural Society's Award of Garden Merit.
