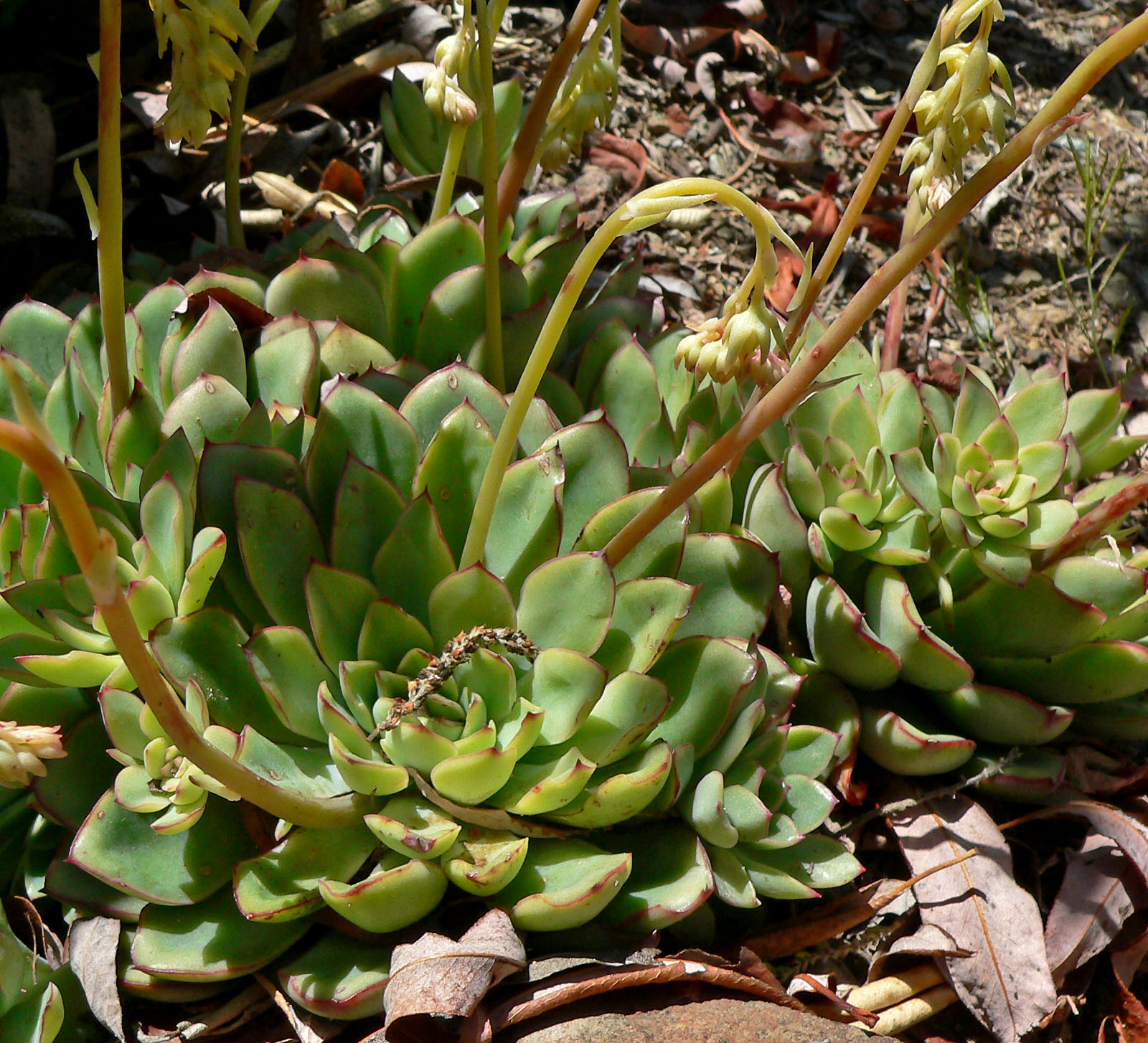

Scientific classification
- Kingdom: Plantae
- Clade: Tracheophytes
- Clade: Angiosperms
- Clade: Eudicots
- Order: Saxifragales
- Family: Crassulaceae
- Genus: Echeveria
- Species: E. pulidonis

Binomial name
- Echeveria pulidonis E.Walther

= Echeveria pulidonis =

Species of succulent

Echeveria pulidonis is a species of flowering plant in the family Crassulaceae, native to central Mexico, more specifically, Puebla and Veracruz.

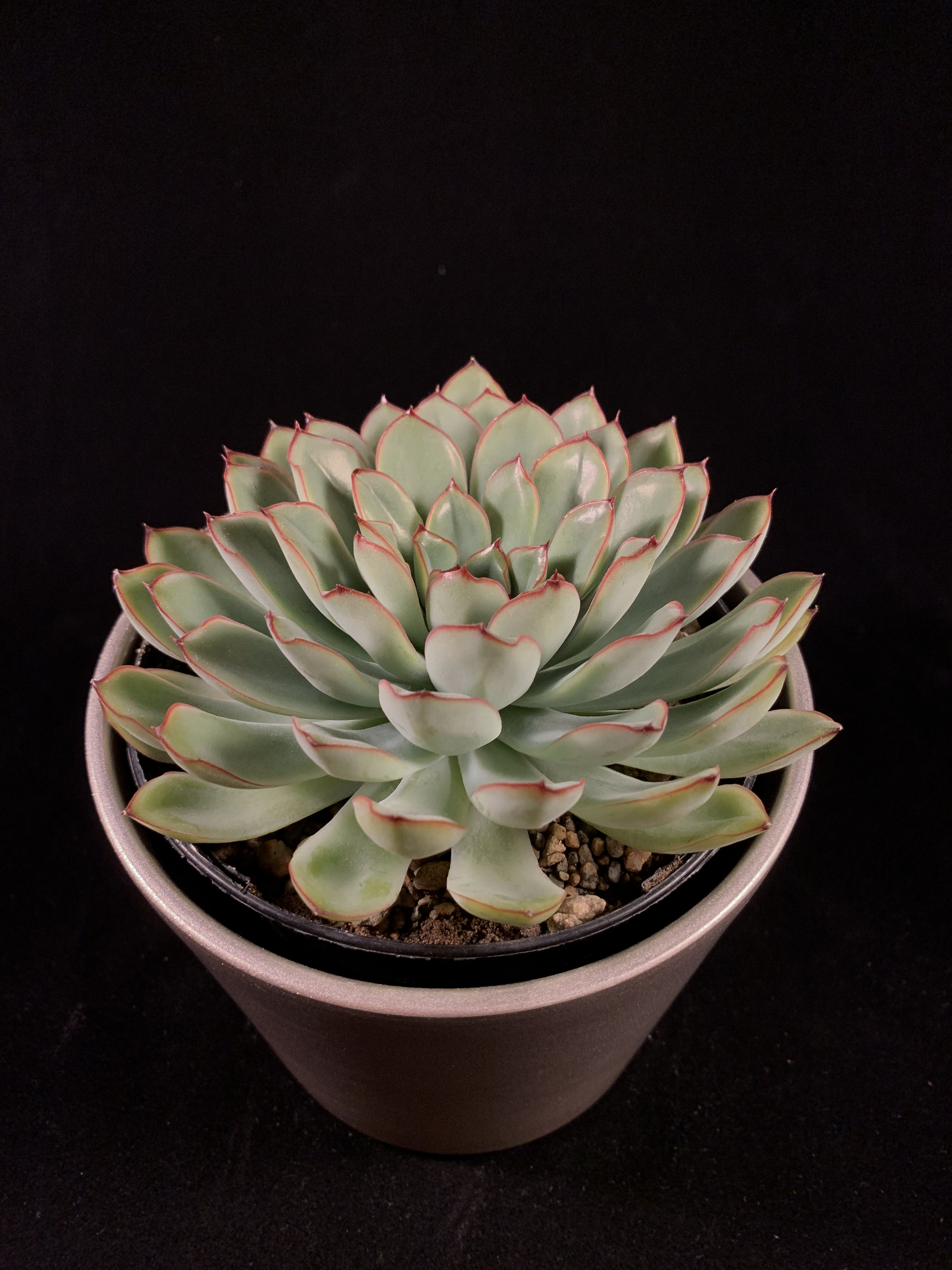
An Echeveria Pulidonis being grown as a houseplant

== Description ==
Habit: Forms rosettes of leaves, and as it ages, it will naturally form offsets, creating clusters of rosettes. Each rosette can reach 13–15 cm in diameter.

Leaves: Tapered to a sharp point. Green with red margins.

Flowers: Yellow.

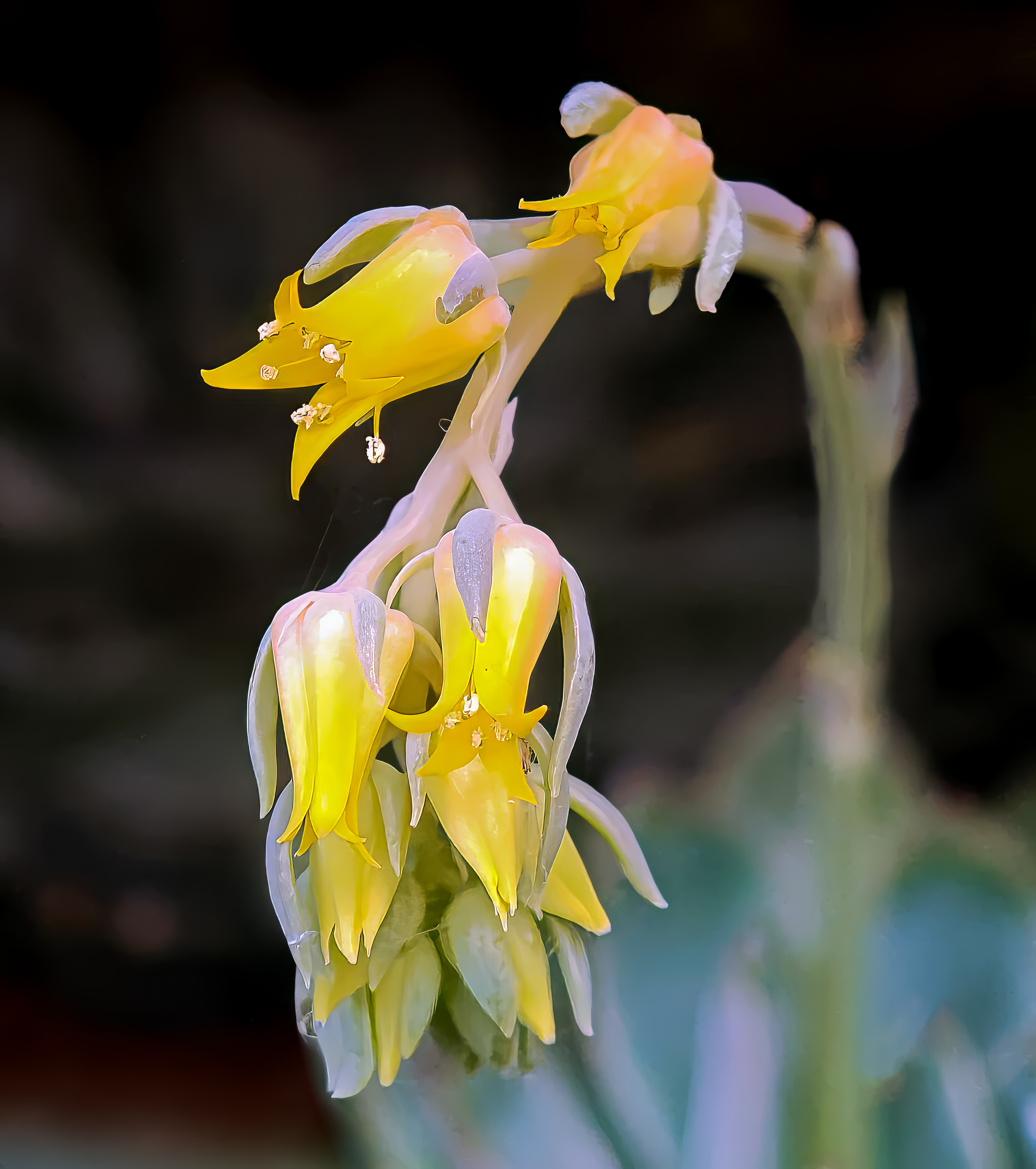
Inflorescence

== Cultivation ==
Half-hardy. Dislikes water sitting on its leaves, but tolerates this more than some other Echeveria species do.

== Taxonomy ==
Echeveria is named for Atanasio Echeverría y Godoy, a botanical illustrator who contributed to Flora Mexicana.
