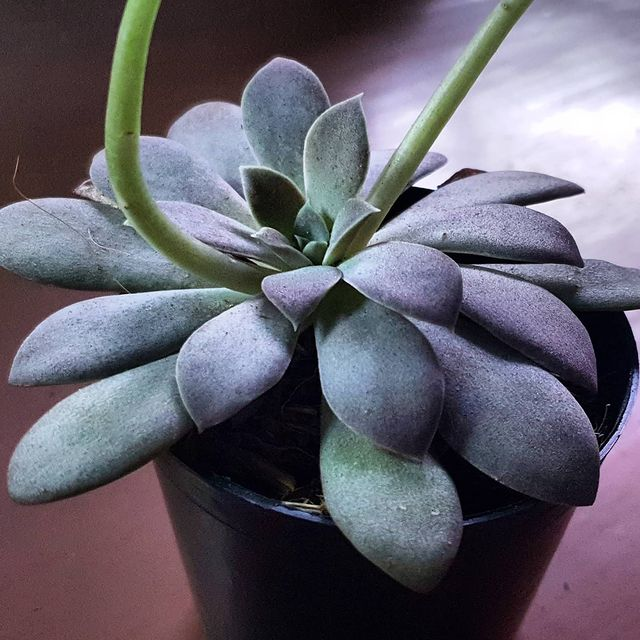

Scientific classification
- Kingdom: Plantae
- Clade: Tracheophytes
- Clade: Angiosperms
- Clade: Eudicots
- Order: Saxifragales
- Family: Crassulaceae
- Genus: Echeveria
- Species: E. carnicolor

Binomial name
- Echeveria carnicolor (Baker) É.Morren

Synonyms
- Cotyledon carnicolor Baker

= Echeveria carnicolor =

Species of succulent

Echeveria carnicolor is a species of flowering plant in the family Crassulaceae, endemic to Veracruz, Mexico.

== Description ==
Echeveria carnicolor have very flat rosettes with gray-purple and green color. The rosettes have a diameter of up to 5 inches (130 mm). The leaves are pointy, long, and thin, with 4 inches (100 mm) long and 1.2 inches (30 mm) wide. The plant can reach 2.4 inches (61 mm) tall. The flowers color are red and orange.
