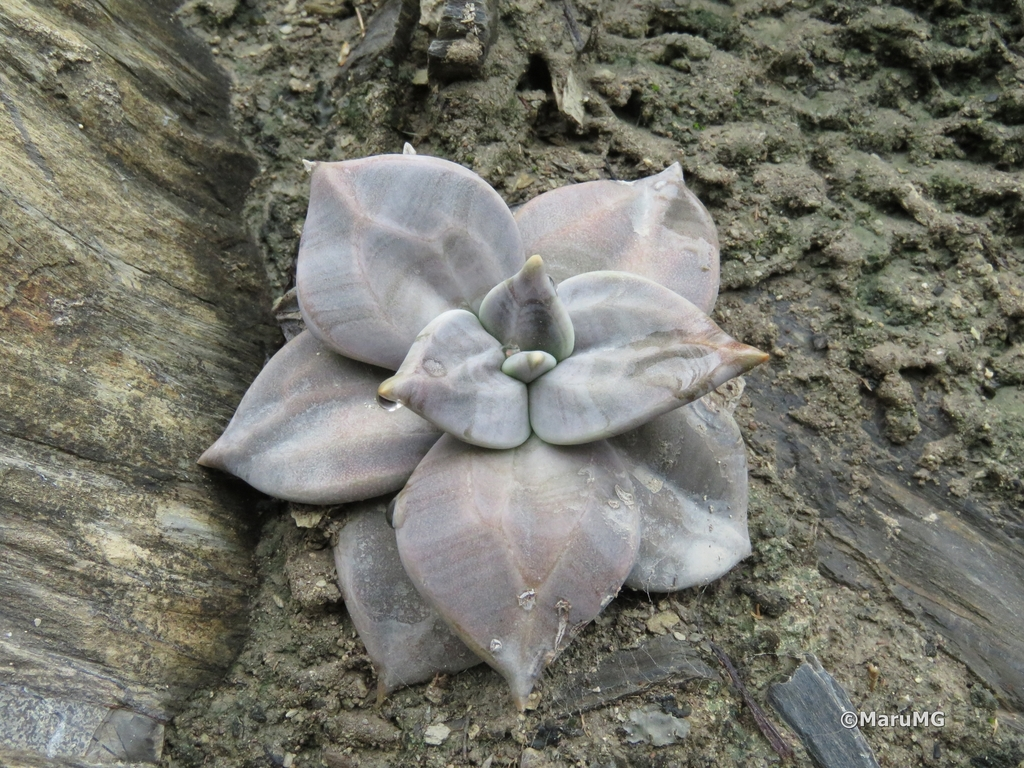

Scientific classification
- Kingdom: Plantae
- Clade: Tracheophytes
- Clade: Angiosperms
- Clade: Eudicots
- Order: Saxifragales
- Family: Crassulaceae
- Genus: Echeveria
- Species: E. xichuensis

Binomial name
- Echeveria xichuensis L.G.López & J.Reyes

= Echeveria xichuensis =

Species of succulent

Echeveria xichuensis is a succulent species of flowering plant in the family Crassulaceae, endemic to Xichú, Guanajuato, Mexico.

== Description ==
Echeveria xichuensis has a short stem, with thick, pointy, elliptical to egg-shaped leaves. The leaves color are dark olive-green to tinged purple. The rosettes grow into 4.8 in (120 mm) diameter. The leaves are 2.4 in (61 mm) long and 1.0 in (25 mm) wide. The flowers usually are salmon pink color on the outside, orange inside and usually bloom in spring.
