= Reidmorania =

- R. occidentalis

Scientific classification
- Kingdom: Plantae
- Clade: Tracheophytes
- Clade: Angiosperms
- Clade: Eudicots
- Order: Saxifragales
- Family: Crassulaceae
- Genus: Reidmorania
- Species: R. occidentalis

Binomial name
- Reidmorania occidentalis Kimnach, 2017

Synonyms
- Graptopetalum occidentale Rose ex Walther; Echeveria kimnachii Meyran & Vega

Genus of succulents

Reidmorania occidentalis is a succulent plant in the stonecrop family (Crassulaceae) native to the state of Sinaloa in Mexico. It is within the monotypic genus Reidmorania, which is named after botanist Reid Moran, who was notable for his research in the Crassulaceae family.

== Description ==
=== Morphology ===
The plant grows in a caespitose habit, with short stems and rosettes around 4.5 cm wide. The leaves are oblanceolate and obtuse, mucronate, glabrous, and bluish green to green. The inflorescence is paniculate, with floral stems 11 to 36 cm long, bearing 3 to 10 flowers. The sepals are ascending, adpressed, ovate, and are colored olive-green, with the corolla tubular-campanulate, 6 to 7 mm long, 4 mm wide at the base, and 7 mm wide at the mouth. The petals are ascending, imbricate, and oblanceolate, keeled, and with three to five faint reddish longitudinal veins, the central darkest, and merging with the cuspidate reddish apex.

== Taxonomy ==
=== Taxonomic history ===
The plant was discovered to science in Sinaloa by a collector J. G. Ortega in 1920. This plant was originally placed as Graptopetalum occidentale, described by Joseph Nelson Rose and Eric Walther in 1933 from the single collection. Echeveria kimnachii was also described later in 1998 by Jorge Meyrán and Rito Vega, named after botanist Myron Kimnach. It was placed in the series Paniculatae, compared with Echeveria amoena and Echeveria microcalyx. Kimnach himself realized the species was synonymous with Graptopetalum occidentale, but noticed that the species did not fit into Graptopetalum, and thus was moved into the new genus Reidmorania, named after Kimnach's late colleague Reid Moran.

== Distribution and habitat ==
This plant is found in the Culiacán Municipality of Sinaloa state, on the northwestern coast of México, to the southeast of Baja California. It is also found in a limited area near La Sierra de Tacuichamona. In habitat, it occurs in tropical to sub-tropical and sub-deciduous forest, commonly associated with species of Agave, Brosimum, Bursera, Echeveria and Hechtia.
