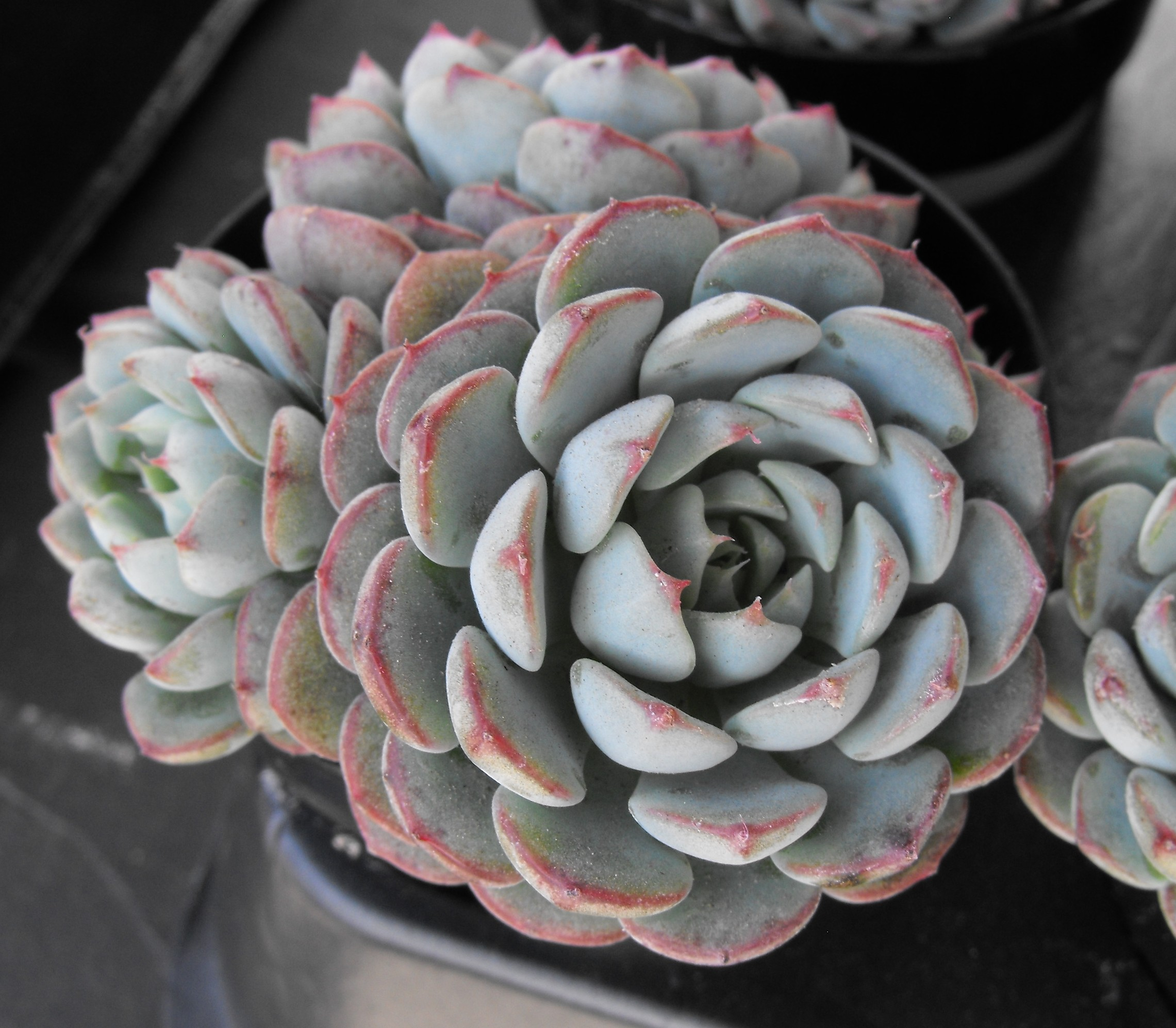

Scientific classification
- Kingdom: Plantae
- Clade: Embryophytes
- Clade: Tracheophytes
- Clade: Angiosperms
- Clade: Eudicots
- Order: Saxifragales
- Family: Crassulaceae
- Genus: Echeveria
- Species: E. minima

Binomial name
- Echeveria minima J.Meyrán

= Echeveria minima =

Species of flowering plant

Echeveria minima, the miniature (or mini) echeveria, is a species of succulent flowering plant in the stonecrop (sedum) family, Crassulaceae, native to northeastern Mexico. Among the many Echeveria species and cultivars, Echeveria minima, in particular, has rather small and diminutive, light-teal blue rosettes edged with pink leaf margins. The attractive "artichoke"-like rosettes eventually produce enough offsets that they grow into a small colony, forming a low mound. Echeveria minima readily produces yellow, bell-shaped flowers on vertical inflorescences in the spring. A highly collectible succulent, it has gained the Royal Horticultural Society's Award of Garden Merit.

== Description ==
Echeveria minima has small, blue-green rosettes with pinkish leaf margins. It produces yellow bell-shaped flowers from an inflorescence spike in the spring. It is not very cold-hardy, thus will not tolerate prolonged frost or temperatures below 20°F (-6.7°C). Additionally, the species is winter-dormant, i.e. it slows its metabolic and photosynthetic processes to "hibernate" and conserve energy in colder seasons; in some milder locations, such as Southern California, Florida or Texas, it is possible that E. minima may not remain dormant for as long as it would in colder climates. As with most members of the Crassulaceae, E. minima reproduces both through pollination and the asexual reproduction of small offsets, sprouting plantlets (also called "chicks" or "pups") from the stem of a larger "mother" plant, inevitably growing into a colony or cluster, with time. Pups that have matured adequately and grown aerial roots of their own can be divided from the mother in order to start new specimens.
