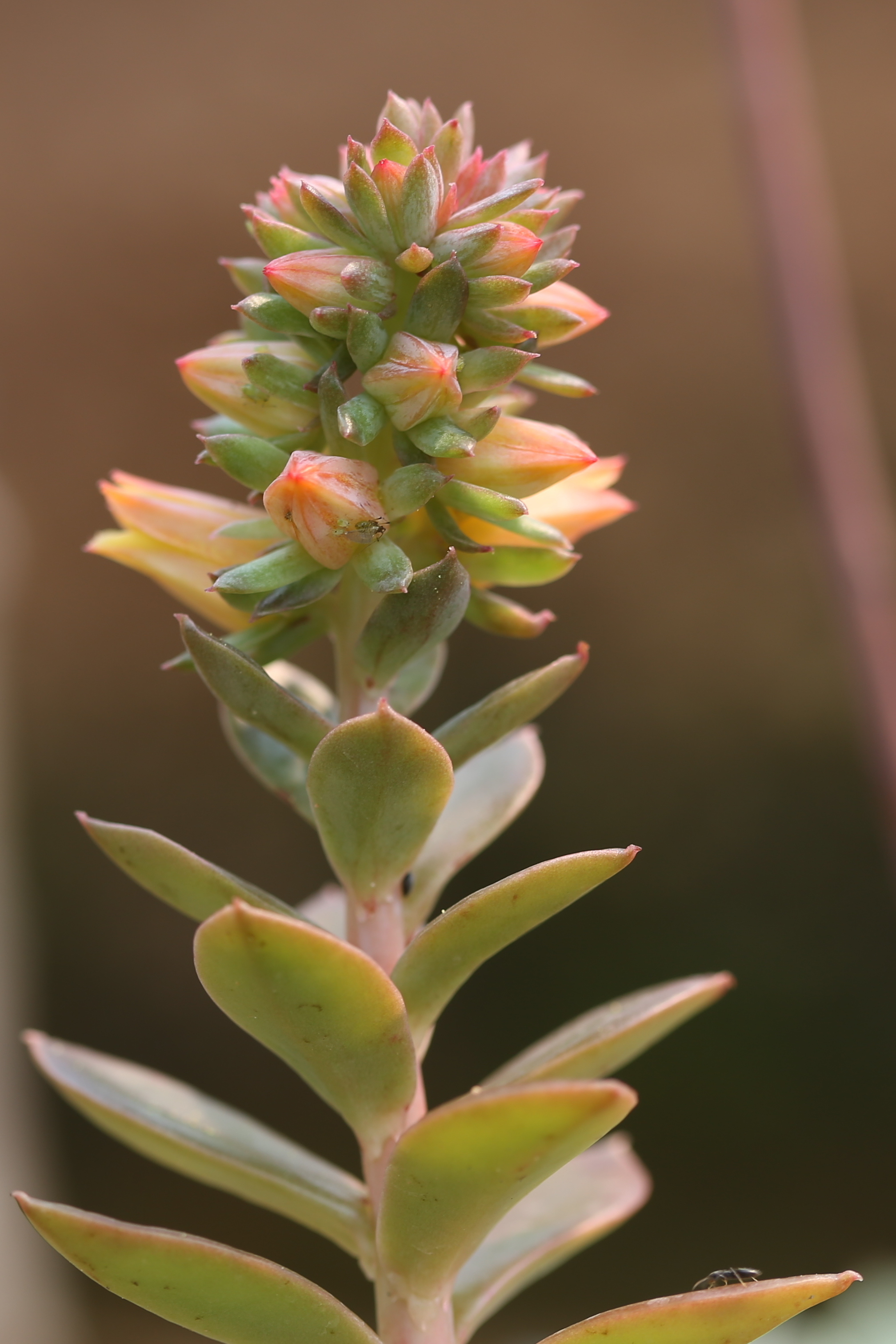
- At the Gothenburg Botanical Garden

Scientific classification
- Kingdom: Plantae
- Clade: Embryophytes
- Clade: Tracheophytes
- Clade: Angiosperms
- Clade: Eudicots
- Order: Saxifragales
- Family: Crassulaceae
- Genus: Echeveria
- Species: E. rosea

Binomial name
- Echeveria rosea Lindl.

Synonyms
- Cotyledon roseata Baker; Courantia echeverioides Lem.; Courantia rosea (Lindl.) Lem.

= Echeveria rosea =

Species of flowering plant

Echeveria rosea is a species of flowering plant in the family Crassulaceae, native to Mexico. A succulent, it has gained the Royal Horticultural Society's Award of Garden Merit.
