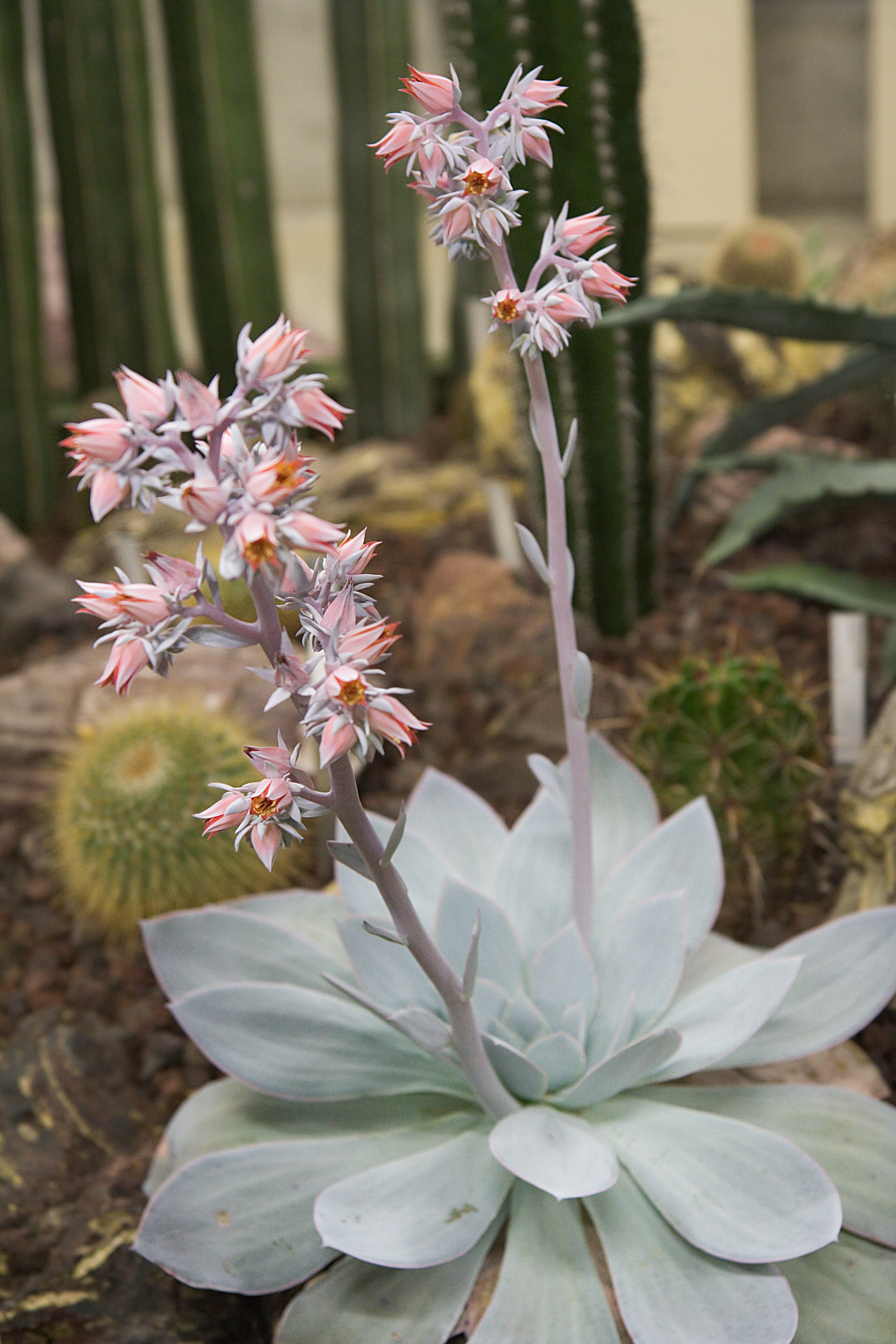
- In bloom
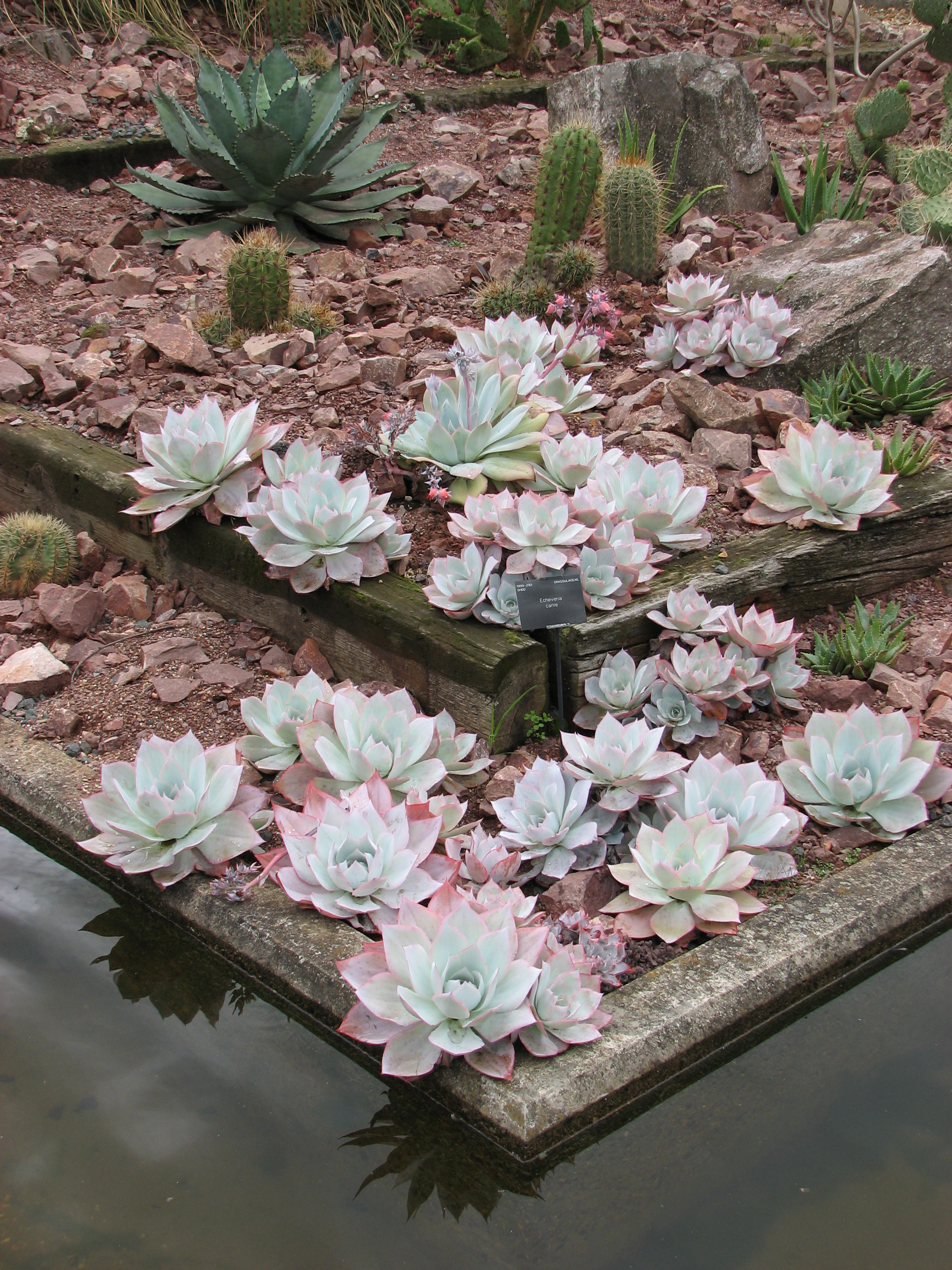
- At Kew Gardens

Scientific classification
- Kingdom: Plantae
- Clade: Embryophytes
- Clade: Tracheophytes
- Clade: Angiosperms
- Clade: Eudicots
- Order: Saxifragales
- Family: Crassulaceae
- Genus: Echeveria
- Species: E. cante

Binomial name
- Echeveria cante Glass & Mend.-Garc.

= Echeveria cante =

Species of flowering plant

Echeveria cante, the white cloud plant, is a species of flowering plant in the family Crassulaceae, native to northwestern Zacatecas state in Mexico. A succulent, it has gained the Royal Horticultural Society's Award of Garden Merit.
