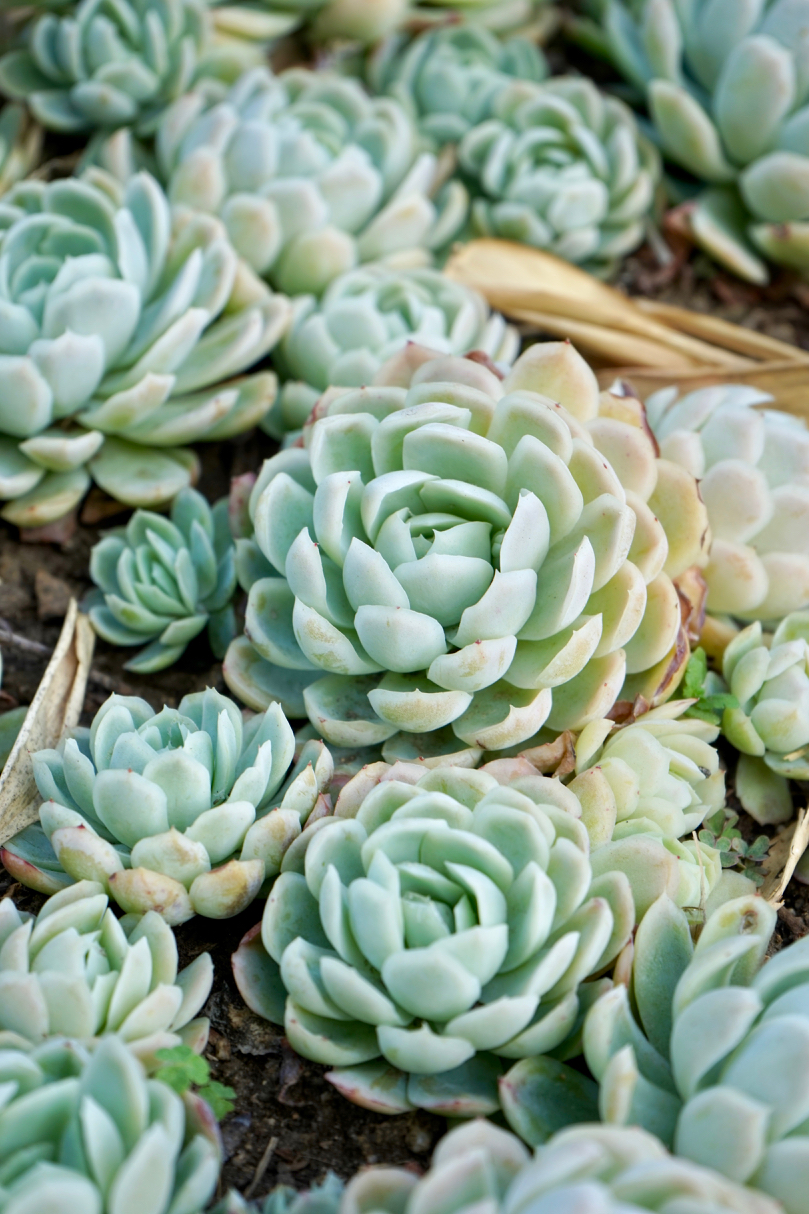
- Echeveria elegans

Scientific classification
- Kingdom: Plantae
- Clade: Tracheophytes
- Clade: Angiosperms
- Clade: Eudicots
- Order: Saxifragales
- Family: Crassulaceae
- Subfamily: Sempervivoideae
- Tribe: Sedeae
- Genus: Echeveria; DC.

Species
- See text

Synonyms
- Courantia Lem.: Oliveranthus Rose; Oliverella Rose; Urbinia Rose

= Echeveria =

Genus of succulents

Echeveria is a large genus of flowering plants in the family Crassulaceae, native to semi-desert areas of Central America, Mexico and northwestern South America.

== Description ==
Echeveria plants are evergreen. Flowers on short stalks (cymes) arise from compact rosettes of succulent fleshy, often brightly coloured leaves. Species are polycarpic, meaning that they may flower and set seed many times over the course of their lifetimes. Often, numerous offsets are produced, and are commonly known as "hen and chicks", which can also refer to other genera, such as Sempervivum, that are significantly different from Echeveria.

Many species of Echeveria serve important environmental roles, such as those of host plants for butterflies. For example, the butterfly Callophrys xami uses several species of Echeveria, such as Echeveria gibbiflora, as suitable host plants. Even more, these plants are integral to the oviposition process of C. xami and some other butterfly species as well.

== Etymology ==
Echeveria is named for Atanasio Echeverría y Godoy, a botanical illustrator who contributed to Flora Mexicana.

== Taxonomy ==
The genus was erected by A. P. de Candolle in 1828, and is named after the 18th century Mexican botanical artist Atanasio Echeverría y Godoy. As of June 2018, the genus consists of about 150 species, including genera such as Oliveranthus and Urbinia that have formerly been split off from Echeveria.

Molecular phylogenetic studies have repeatedly shown the genus not to be monophyletic: species of Echeveria cluster with species of Cremnophila, Graptopetalum, Pachyphytum, and Thompsonella as well as species of Sedum sect. Pachysedum. The former Urbinia species do appear to form a monophyletic group within this grouping. Although it is clear that Echeveria is not monophyletic, its limits are not clear, and further analyses are needed to determine whether and how the genus should be split, or if it should be included in an expanded concept of Sedum.

=== Species ===
The International Crassulaceae Network accepts the following species:

- Echeveria acutifolia Lindley
- Echeveria affinis Walther
- Echeveria agavoides Lemaire
- Echeveria alata Alexander
- Echeveria amoena De Smet
- Echeveria amphoralis Walther
- Echeveria andicola Pino
- Echeveria angustifolia Walther
- Echeveria atropurpurea (Baker) Morren
- Echeveria aurantiaca Reyes, Gonzáles-Zorzano & Brachet
- Echeveria australis Rose
- Echeveria bakeri Kimnach
- Echeveria ballsii Walther
- Echeveria bella Alexander
- Echeveria bicolor (Humb. & Bonpl.) Walther
- Echeveria bifida Schlechtendal
- Echeveria brachetii Reyes & Gonzáles
- Echeveria calderoniae Pérez-Calix
- Echeveria calycosa Moran
- Echeveria canaliculata Hooker f.
- Echeveria cante Glass & Mendoza-Garcia
- Echeveria carminea Alexander
- Echeveria carnicolor E. Morren
- Echeveria cerrograndensis Nieves-Hernández et al.
- Echeveria chapalensis Moran & C.H.Uhl
- Echeveria chazaroi Kimnach
- Echeveria chiclensis (Ball) Berger
- Echeveria chihuahuaensis von Poellnitz
- Echeveria chilonensis (Kuntze) Walther
- Echeveria coccinea (Cavanilles) DC
- Echeveria colorata Walther
- Echeveria compressicaulis Eggli & Taylor
- Echeveria corallina Alexander
- Echeveria coruana Garcia et al.
- Echeveria craigiana Walther
- Echeveria crenulata Rose
- Echeveria cuencaensis von Poellnitz
- Echeveria cuspidata Rose
- Echeveria dactylifera Walther
- Echeveria decumbens Kimnach
- Echeveria derenbergii J.A.Purpus
- Echeveria desmetiana De Smet
- Echeveria diffractens Kimnach & A.B.Lau
- Echeveria elegans Rose
- Echeveria eurychlamys (Diels) Berger
- Echeveria excelsa (Diels)Berger
- Echeveria fimbriata C.H.Thompson
- Echeveria fulgens Lemaire
- Echeveria gibbiflora DC
- Echeveria gigantea Rose & Purpus
- Echeveria globuliflora Walther
- Echeveria globulosa Moran
- Echeveria goldmanii Rose
- Echeveria gracilis (Rose) Moran
- Echeveria grisea Walther
- Echeveria guatemalensis Rose
- Echeveria gudeliana Véliz & García-Mendoza
- Echeveria guerrerensis Reyes, González-Zorzano & Brachet
- Echeveria halbingeri Walther
- Echeveria harmsii J.F.Macbride
- Echeveria helmutiana Kimnach
- Echeveria heterosepala Rose
- Echeveria holwayi Rose
- Echeveria humilis Rose
- Echeveria hyalina E.Walther
- Echeveria johnsonii Walther
- Echeveria juarezensis Walther
- Echeveria juliana Reyes, González-Zorzano & Kristen
- Echeveria kimnachii Meyrán & Vega
- Echeveria krahnii Kimnach
- Echeveria laui Moran&Meyrán
- Echeveria leucotricha Purpus
- Echeveria lilacina Kimnach & Moran
- Echeveria longiflora Walther
- Echeveria longissima Walther
- Echeveria lozanoi Rose
- Echeveria lutea Rose
- Echeveria lyonsii Kimnach
- Echeveria macdougallii Walther
- Echeveria macrantha Standley & Steyermark
- Echeveria marianae García-Ruiz & Costea
- Echeveria maxonii Rose
- Echeveria megacalyx Walther
- Echeveria minima J.Meyrán
- Echeveria mondragoniana Reyes & Brachet
- Echeveria montana Rose
- Echeveria moranii Walther
- Echeveria mucronata Schlechtendal
- Echeveria multicaulis Rose
- Echeveria munizii Padilla-Lepe & A. Vázquez
- Echeveria nayaritensis Kimnach
- Echeveria nebularum Moran & Kimnach
- Echeveria nodulosa (Baker) Otto
- Echeveria novogaliciana Reyes, Brachet & González-Zorzano
- Echeveria nuda Lindley
- Echeveria nuyooensis Reyes & Islas
- Echeveria olivacea Moran
- Echeveria oreophila Kimnach
- Echeveria pallida Walther
- Echeveria paniculata Gray
- Echeveria papillosa Kimnach & C.H.Uhl
- Echeveria patriotica García & Pérez-Calix
- Echeveria penduliflora Walther
- Echeveria pendulosa Kimnach & Uhl
- Echeveria perezcalixii Jimeno-Sevilla & Carillo
- Echeveria peruviana Meyrán
- Echeveria pilosa J.A.Purpus
- Echeveria pinetorum Rose
- Echeveriap pistioides García et al.
- Echeveria pittieri Rose
- Echeveria platyphylla Rose
- Echeveria pringlei (S.Watson) Rose
- Echeveria procera Moran
- Echeveria prolifica Moran & J.Meyrán
- Echeveria prunina Kimnach & Moran
- Echeveria pulidonis Walther
- Echeveria pulvinata Rose
- Echeveria purhepecha García
- Echeveria purpusorum Berger
- Echeveria quitensis (Humb. & Bonpl.) Lindley
- Echeveria racemosa Schlechtendal & Chamisso
- Echeveria rauschii van Keppel
- Echeveria recurvata Carruthers
- Echeveria rodolfi Martínez-Ávalos & Mora-Olivo
- Echeveria rosea Lindley
- Echeveria roseiflora Reyes & Gonzáles-Zorzano
- Echeveria rubromarginata Rose
- Echeveria rulfiana Jimeno-Sevilla et al.
- Echeveria runyonii Rose ex Walther
- Echeveria schaffneri (S.Watson) Rose
- Echeveria scheeri Lindley
- Echeveria secunda Booth
- Echeveria semivestita Moran
- Echeveria sessiliflora Rose
- Echeveria setosa Rose & Purpus
- Echeveria shaviana Walther
- Echeveria simulans Rose
- Echeveria skinneri Walther
- Echeveria spectabilis Alexander
- Echeveria steyermarkii Standley
- Echeveria strictiflora A.Gray
- Echeveria subalpina Rose & Purpus
- Echeveria subcorymbosa Kimnach & Moran
- Echeveria subrigida (Robinson & Seaton) Rose
- Echeveria subspicata (Baker) Berger
- Echeveria tamaulipana Martinez-Ávalos, Mora & Terry
- Echeveria tencho Moran & Uhl
- Echeveria tenuis Rose
- Echeveria teretifolia Sessé & Mociño ex DC
- Echeveria tobarensis Berger
- Echeveria tolimanensis Matuda
- Echeveria tolucensis Rose
- Echeveria trianthina Rose
- Echeveria triquiana Reyes & Brachet
- Echeveria turgida Rose
- Echeveria uhlii Meyrán
- Echeveria unguiculata Kimnach
- Echeveria utcubambensis Hutchinson ex Kimnach
- Echeveria uxorum Jimeno-Sevilla & Cházaro
- Echeveria valvata Moran
- Echeveria viridissima Walther
- Echeveria walpoleana Rose
- Echeveria waltheri Moran & Meyrán
- Echeveria westii Walther
- Echeveria whitei Rose
- Echeveria wurdackii Hutchison ex Kimnach
- Echeveria xichuensis Lopez & Reyes
- Echeveria yalmanantlanensis A.Vázquez & Cházaro
- Echeveria zorzaniana Reyes & Brachet

== Cultivation ==
Many Echeveria species are popular as ornamental garden plants. They are drought-resistant, although they do better with regular deep watering and fertilizing. Most will tolerate shade and some frost, although hybrids tend to be less tolerant. Most lose their lower leaves in winter; as a result, after a few years, the plants lose their compact appearance and need to be re-rooted or propagated. In addition, if not removed, the shed leaves may decay, harboring fungus that can then infect the plant.

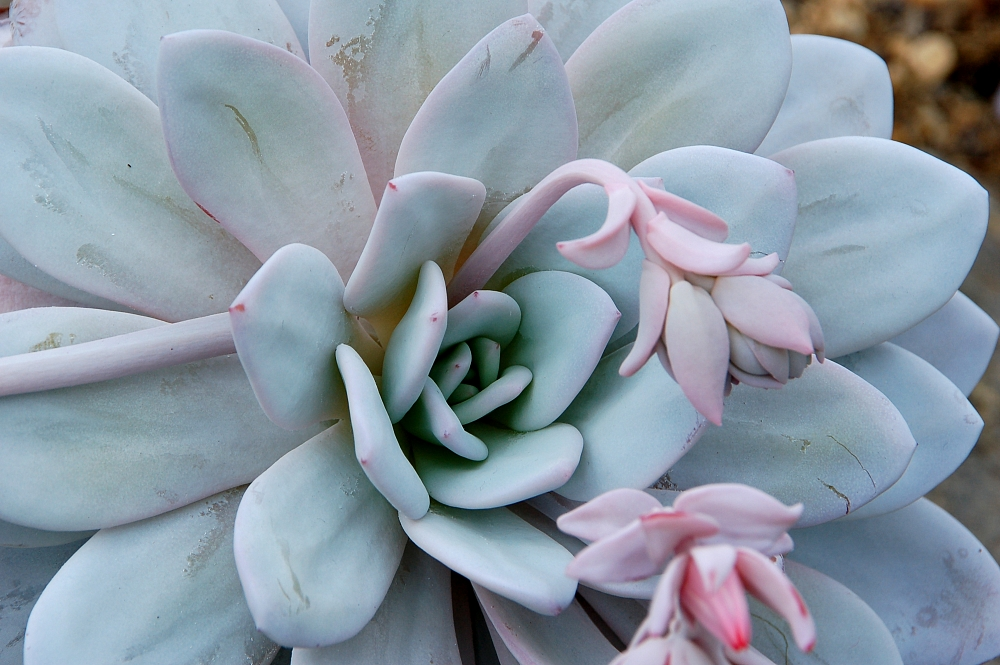
Echeveria laui - a species with round, glaucous leaves

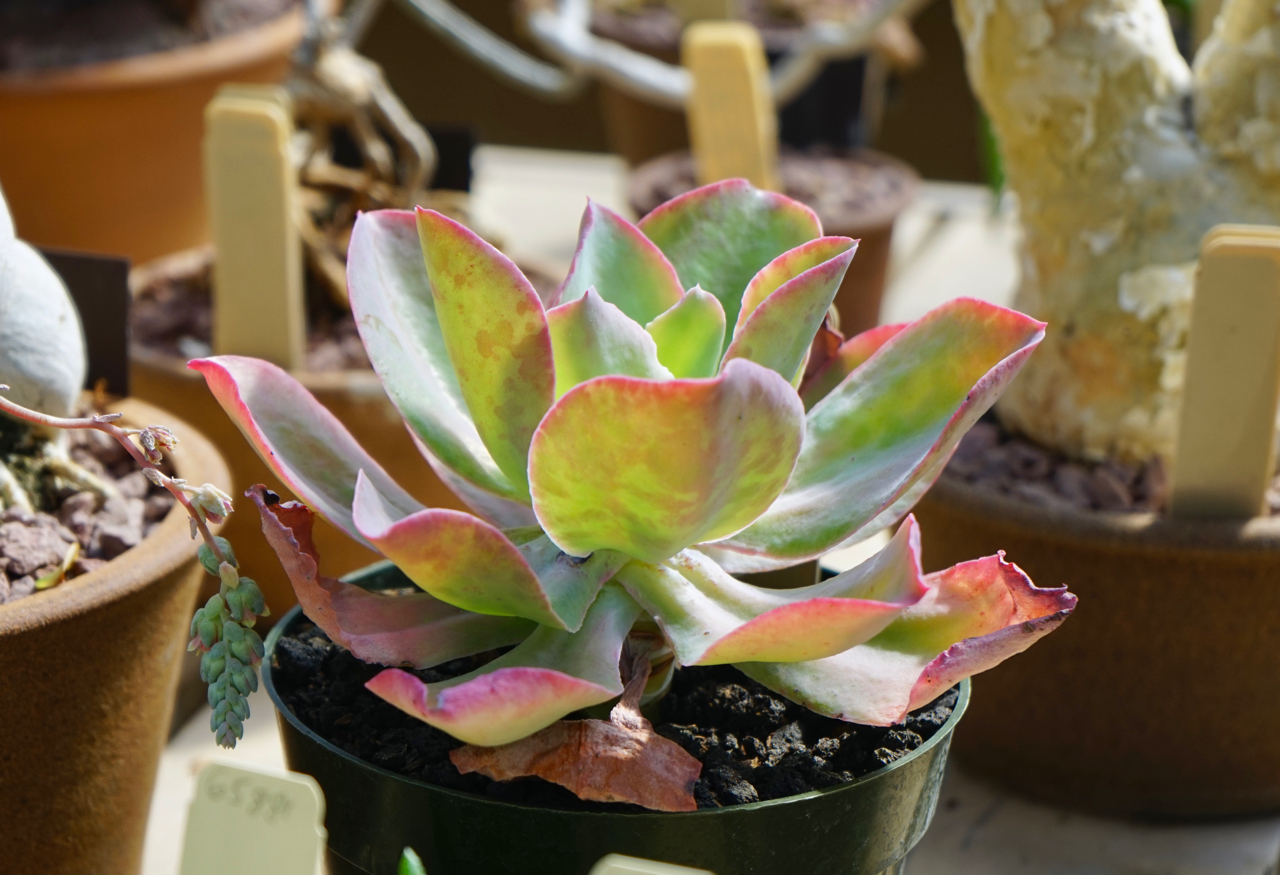
E. gibbiflora

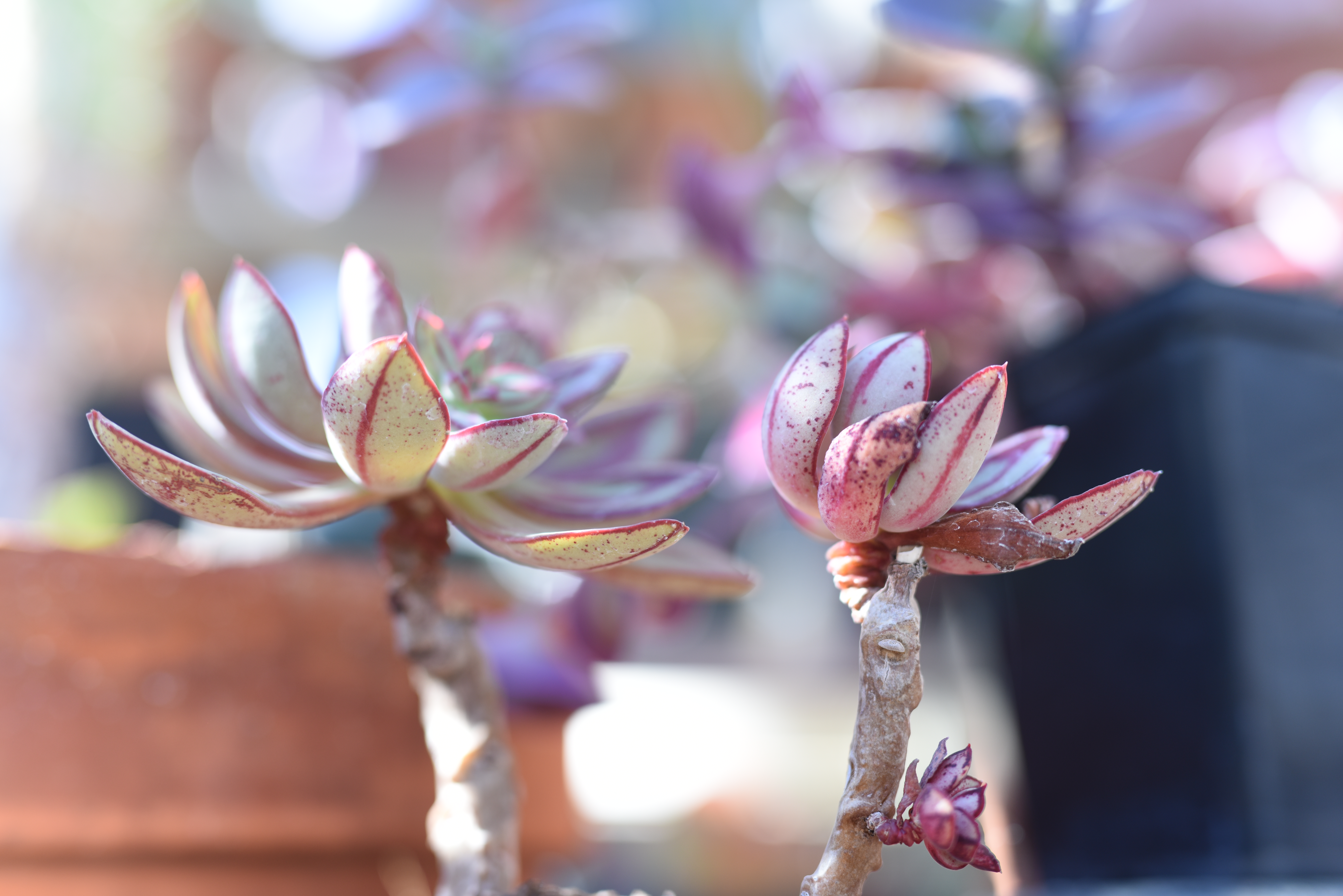
Echeveria nodulosa - painted echeveria

=== Propagation ===
They can be propagated easily by separating offsets, but also by leaf cuttings, and by seed if they are not hybrids.

== Cultivars and Hybrids ==
Echeveria has been extensively bred and hybridized. The following is a selection of available plants.

- 'Arlie Wright'
- 'Black Prince'
- 'Blue Heron'
- 'Blue Surprise' (E. × gilva)
- 'Crimson Tide'
- 'Dondo'
- 'Doris Taylor'
- 'Ebony' (E. agavoides cultivar)
- 'Frank Reinelt'
- 'Hoveyi'
- 'Lipstick' (E. agavoides cultivar)
- 'Oliver' (E. pulvinata cultivar)
- 'Opalina'
- 'Painted Lady'
- 'Perle von Nürnberg'
- 'Paul Bunyan'
- 'Red' (E. × gilva)
- 'Ruberia'
- 'Set-Oliver'
- 'Tippy'
- 'Victor Reiter' (E. agavoides cultivar)
- 'Wavy Curls'
- 'Worfield Wonder' (E. × derosa)

== Award winning ==
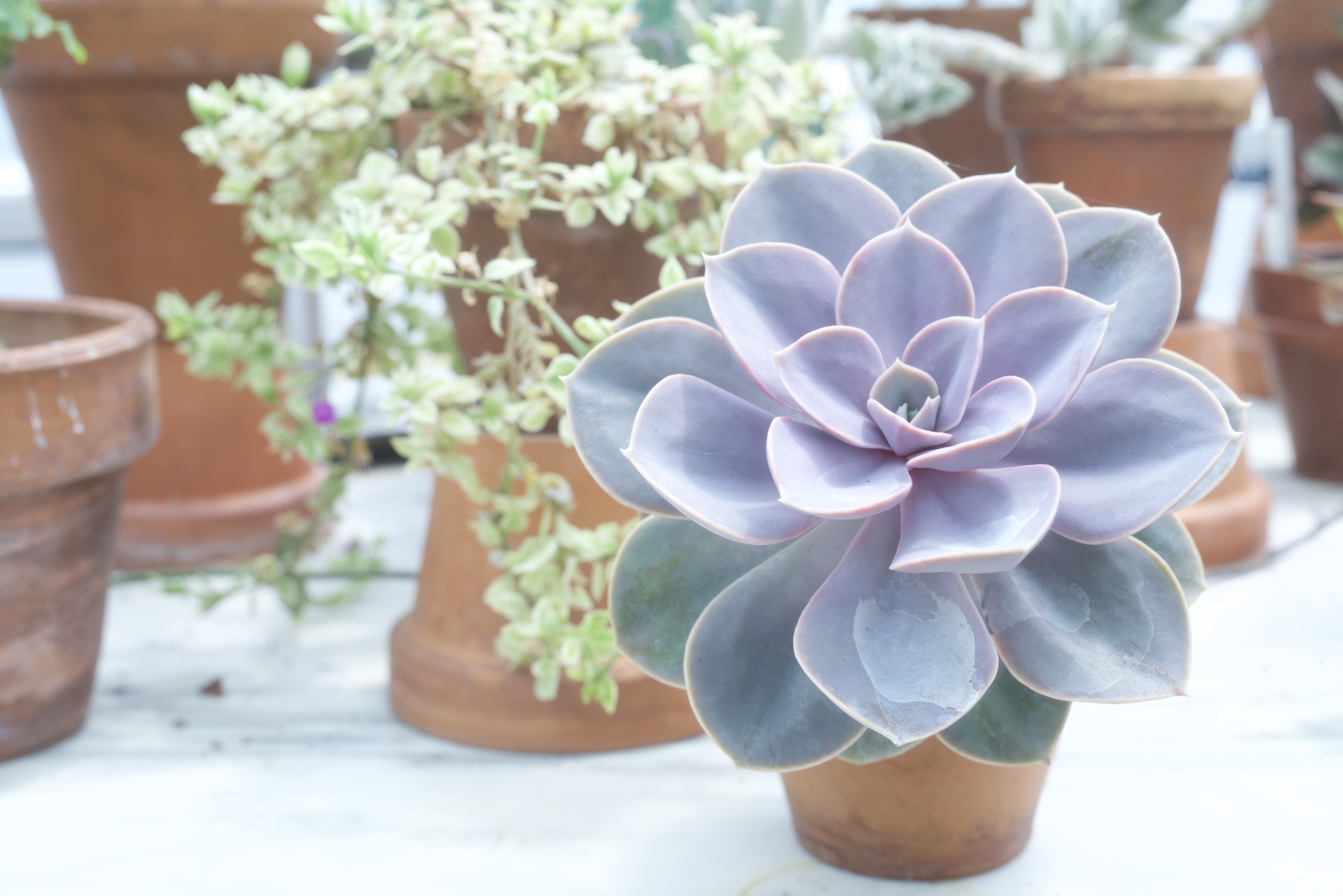
Echeveria 'Perle von Nürnberg'

The following have gained the Royal Horticultural Society's Award of Garden Merit:

- Echeveria agavoides
- Echeveria chihuahuaensis
- Echeveria derenbergii
- Echeveria elegans
- Echeveria 'Perle von Nürnberg'
- Echeveria runyonii 'Topsy Turvy'
- Echeveria secunda var. glauca 'Compton Carousel'
- Echeveria setosa
- Echeveria × bombycina

== Formerly in Echeveria ==
- Dudleya – Alwin Berger placed this as a subtaxon of Echeveria, and species within were described as Echeveria.
- Graptopetalum paraguayense (N.E.Br.) E.Walther (as E. weinbergii hort. ex T.B.Sheph.)
- Pachyveria clavifolia (as E. clavifolia)
- Reidmorania occidentalis (as E. kimnachii)

== Photo gallery ==
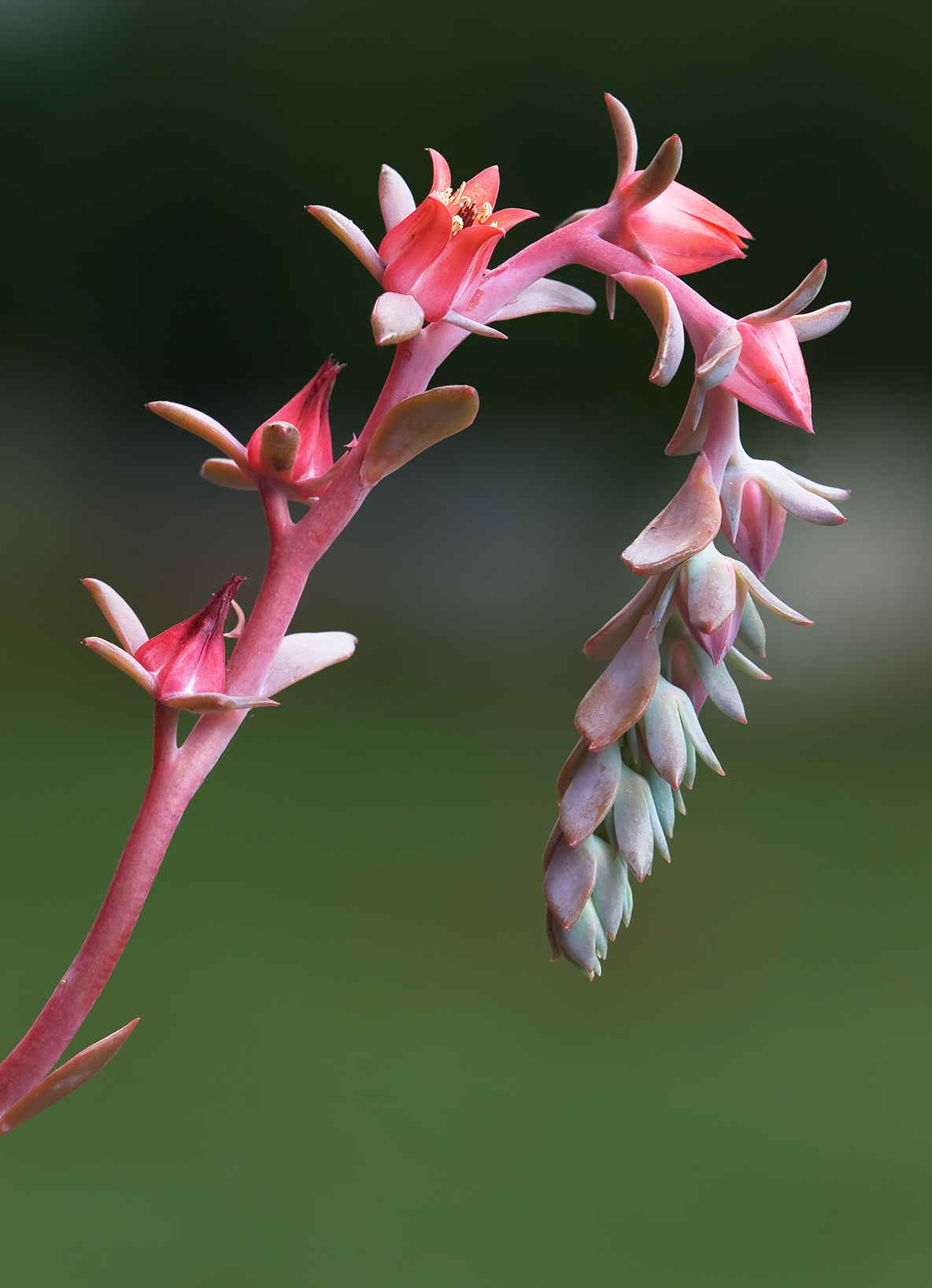
Flowers of Echeveria 'Blue Curl'

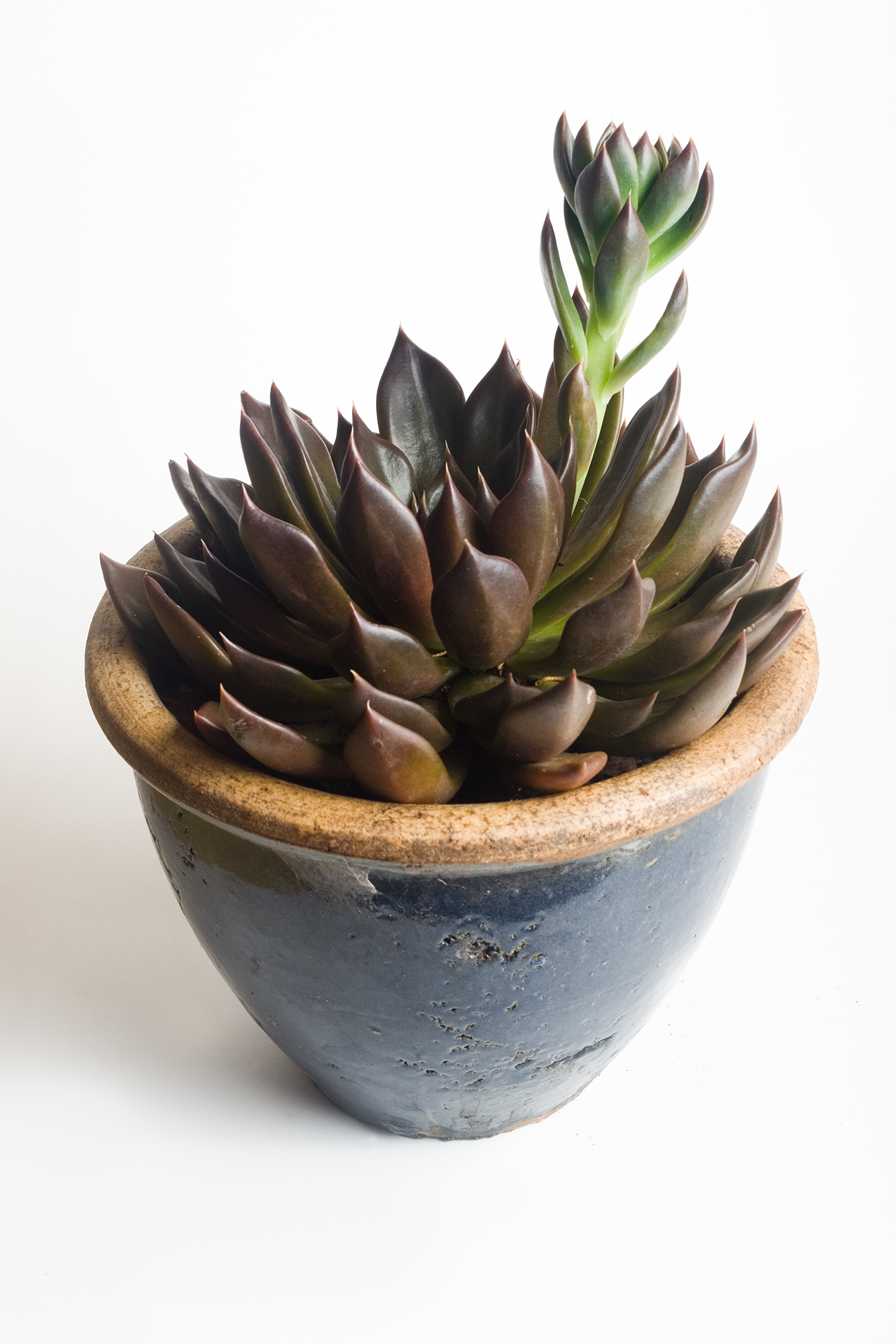
Echeveria cv. 'Black Prince'

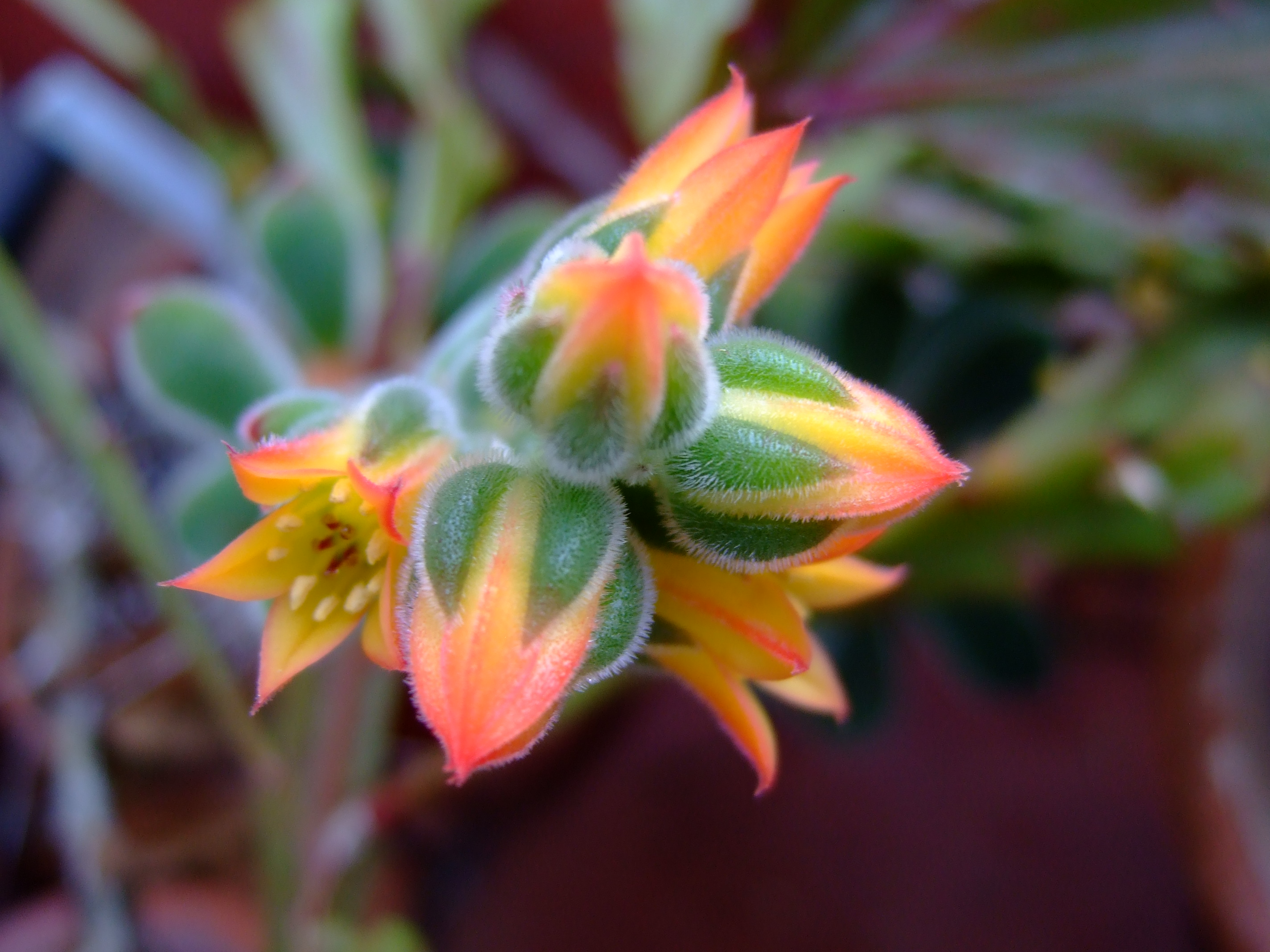
The flowers of E. pulvinata are in bright yellowish orange color.

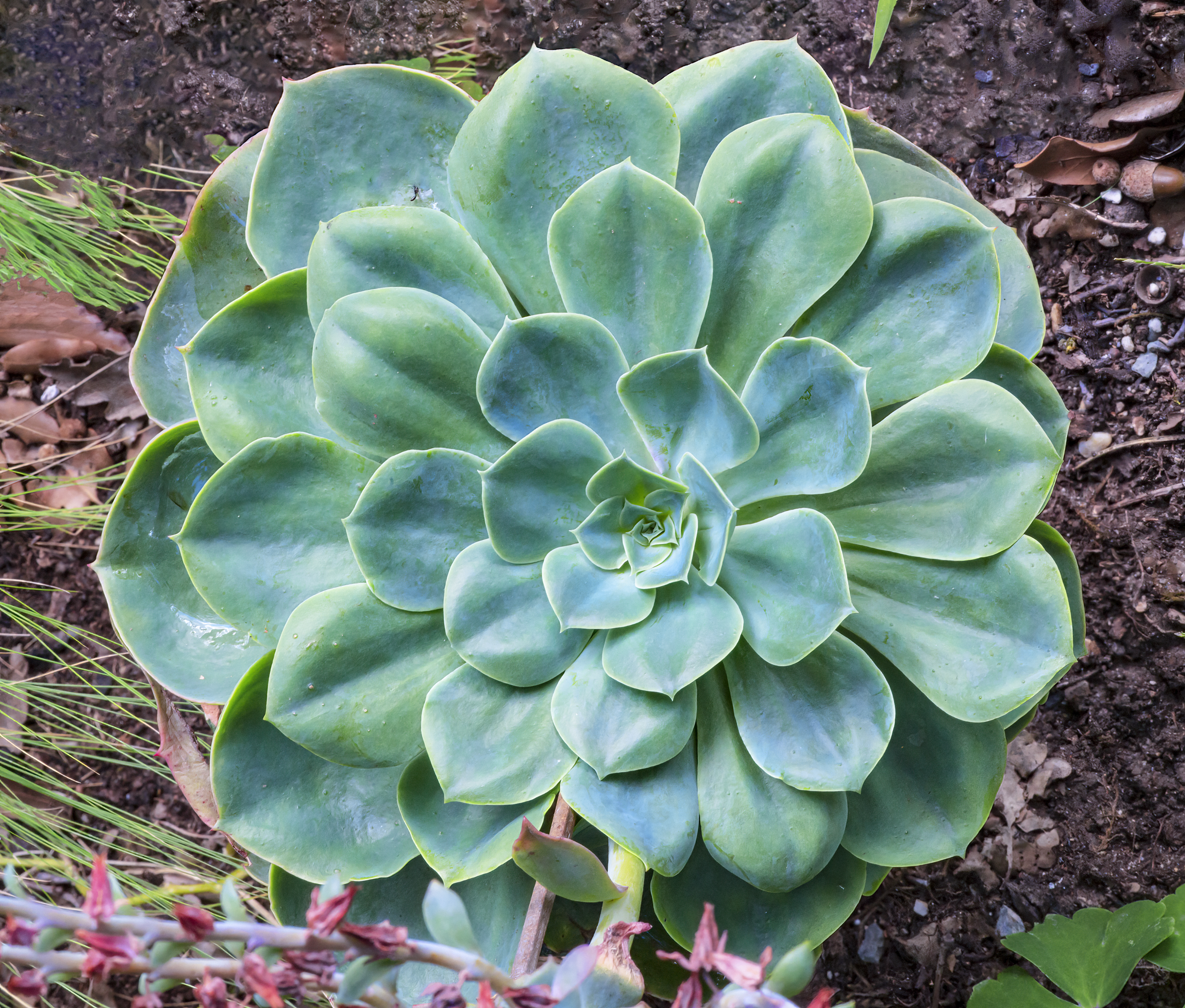
Echeveria secunda

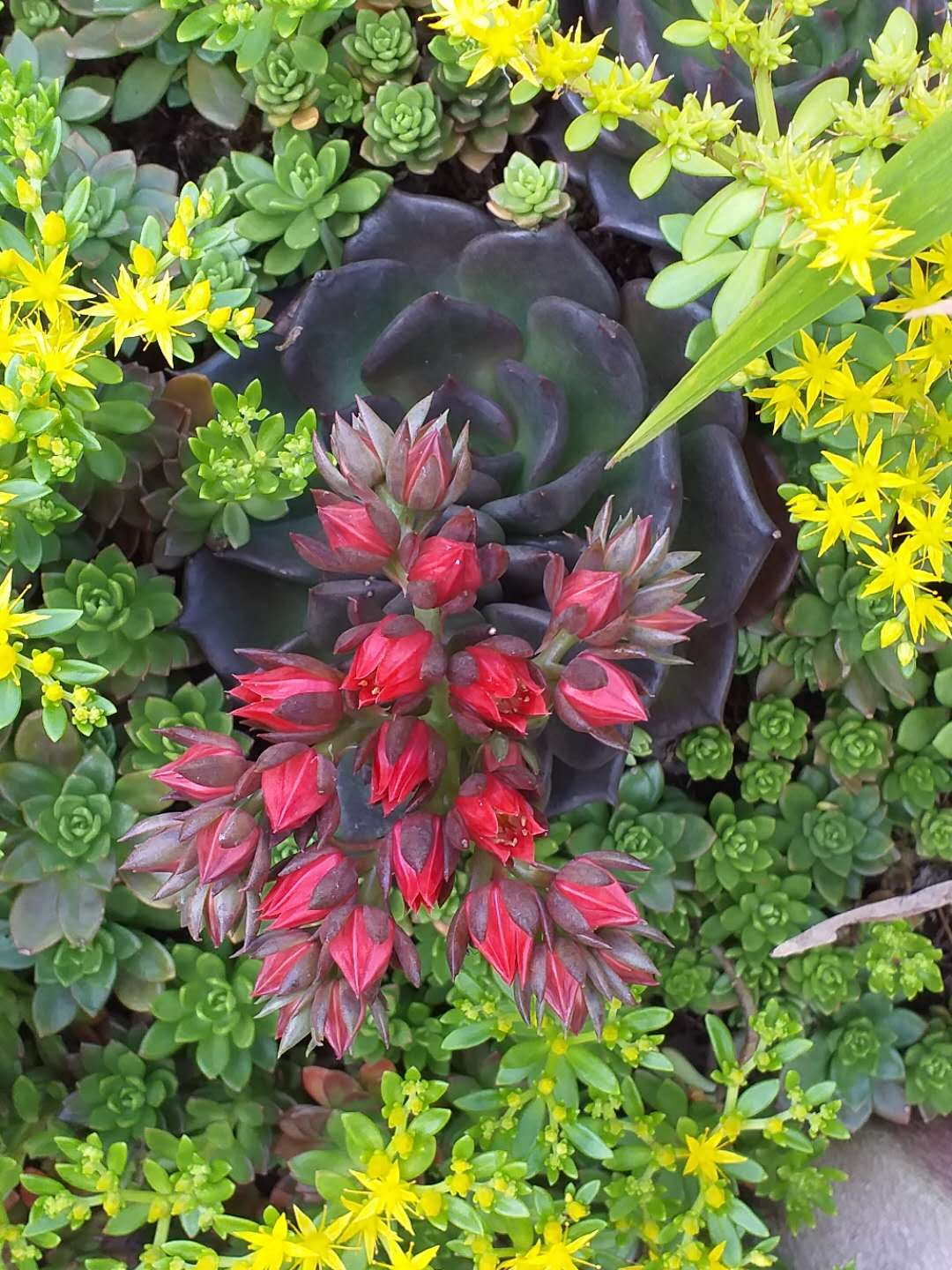
2018 Taichung World Flora Exposition, Taiwan. Echeveria 'Black Prince'.

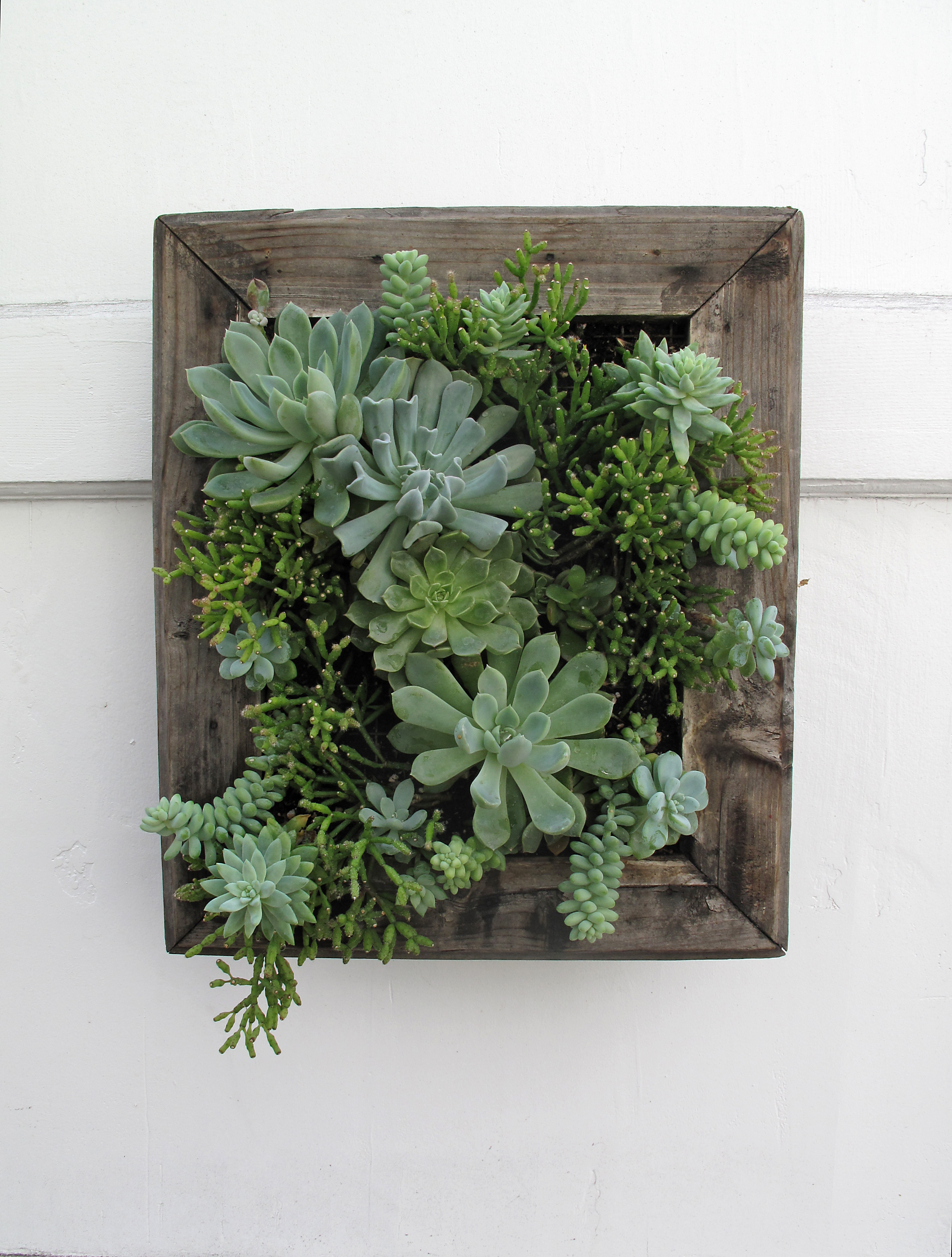
Sculptural quality of Echeveria on display

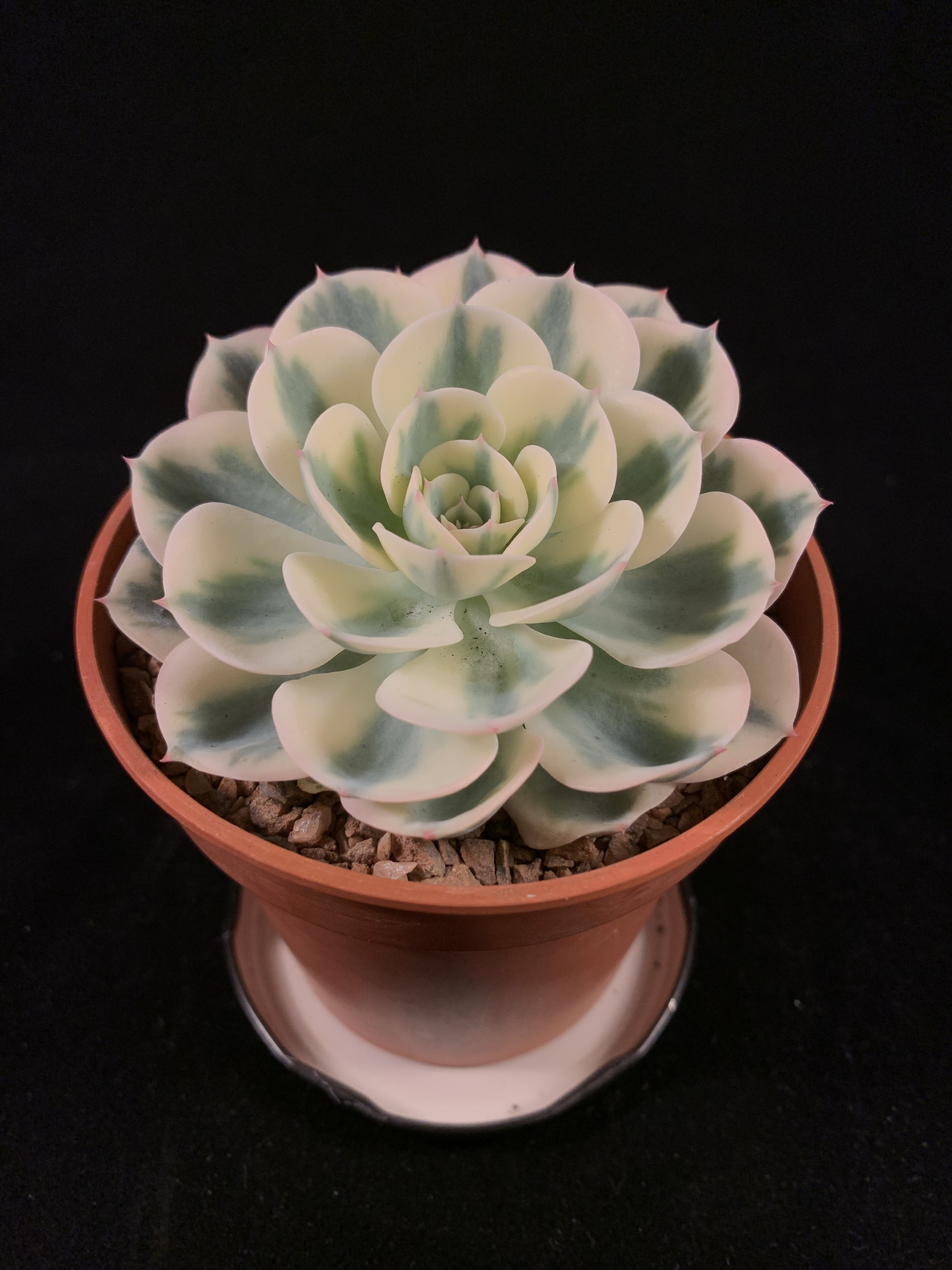
Echeveria 'Compton Carousel'

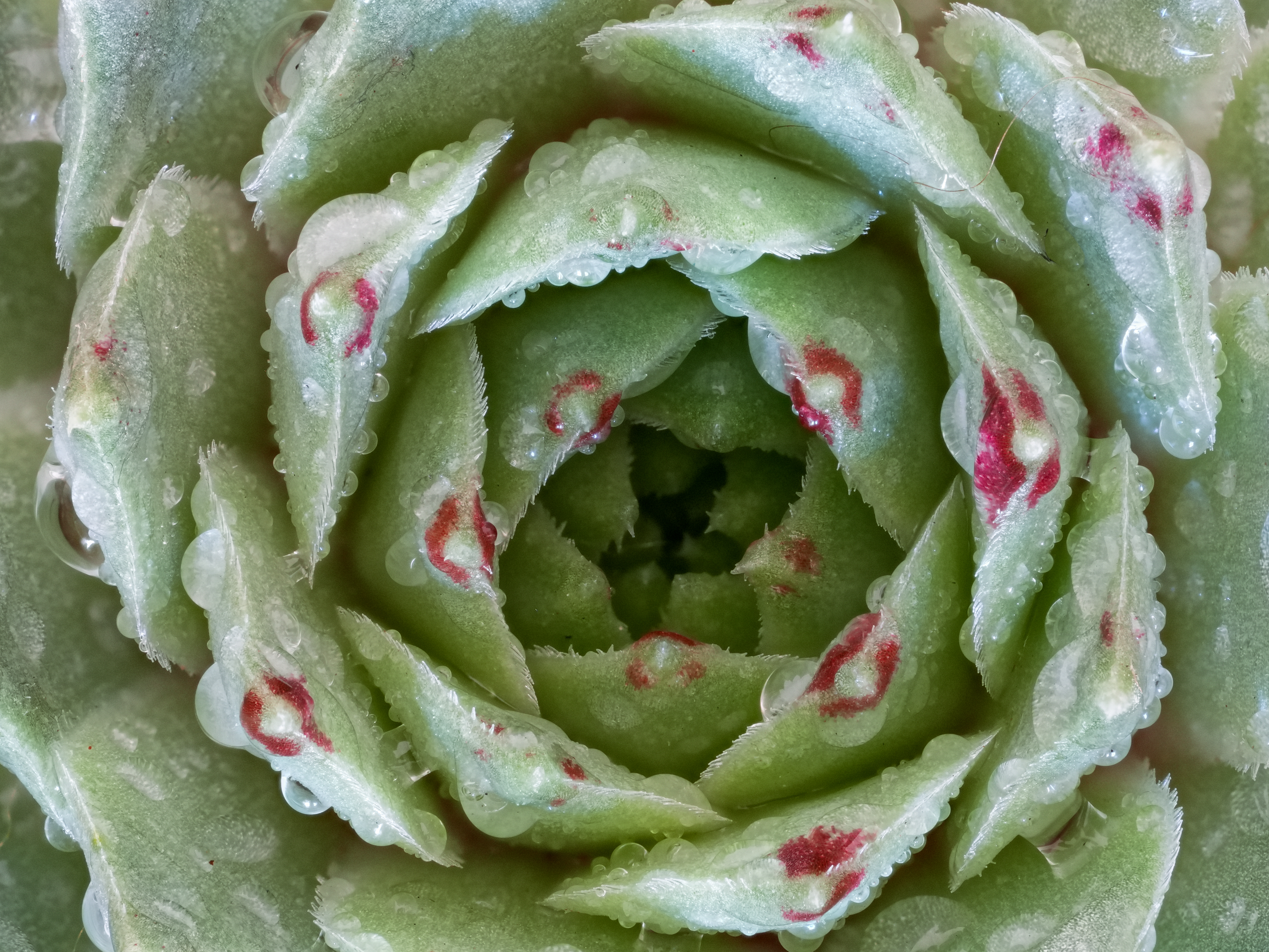
Close-up of leaves (~3.5 cm (1.4 in))

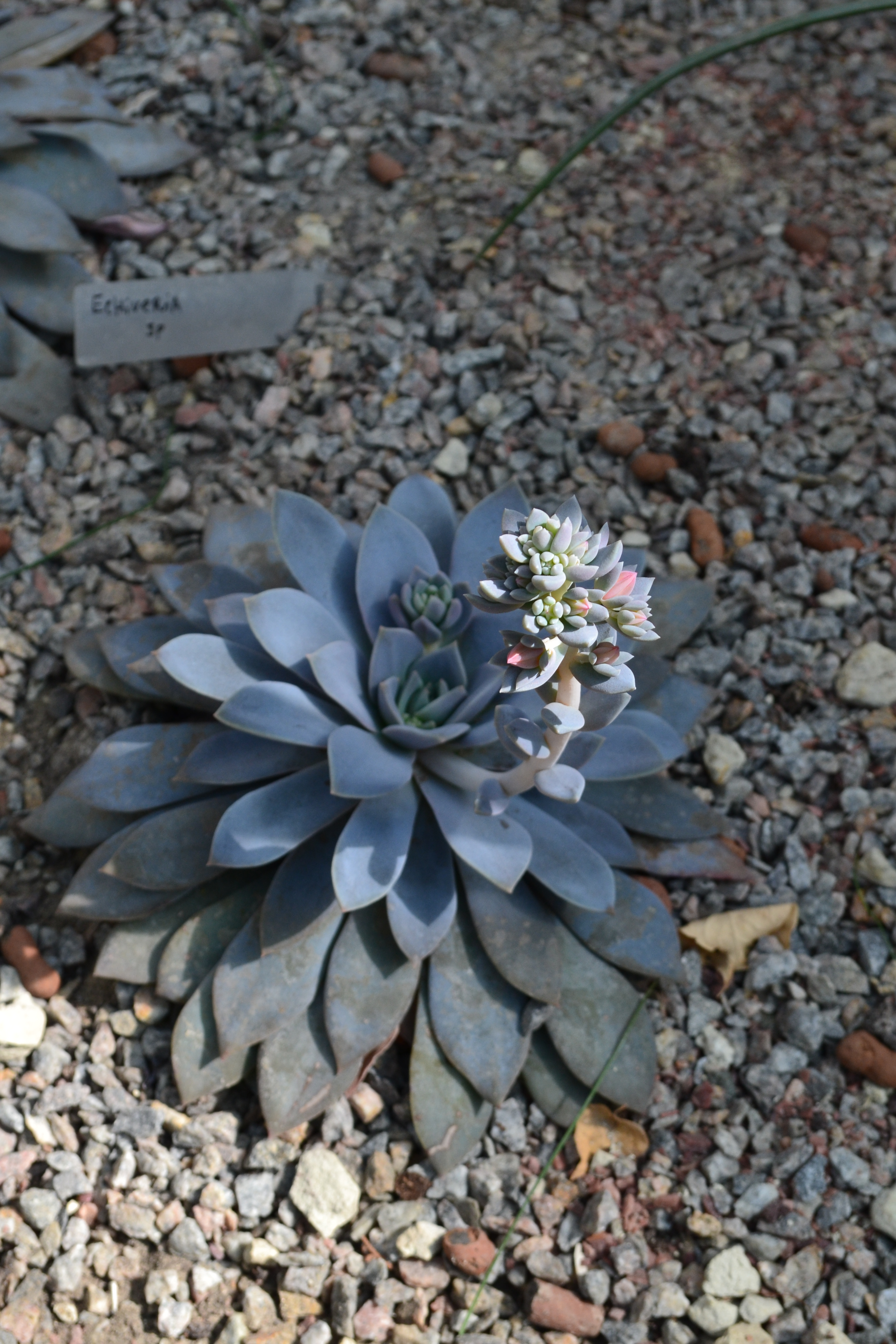
Echeveria cante (in Kharkiv Botanical Garden)
