= Lagunilla =

- Municipality
- Coat of arms

- Location in Salamanca

- Location in Spain
- Coordinates: 40°19′30″N 5°58′18″W
- Country: Spain
- Autonomous community: Castile and León
- Province: Salamanca
- Comarca: Sierra de Béjar

Government
  - Mayor: José María Garrido Domínguez (People's Party)

Area
  - Total: 43 km^{2} (17 sq mi)
- Elevation: 910 m (2,990 ft)

Population (2025-01-01)
  - Total: 414
  - Density: 9.6/km^{2} (25/sq mi)
- Time zone: UTC+1 (CET)
  - Summer (DST): UTC+2 (CEST)
- Postal code: 37724

Lagunilla is a municipality in the Province of Salamanca, Spain. It is 95 km (59 mi) from the provincial capital of Salamanca.

It is bordered by Aldeacipreste, Colmenar de Montemayor, Valdelageve, Sotoserrano and Zarza de Granadilla.

In 2005 it counted 560 inhabitants, of which 300 were male and 260 were female (figures from the INE as of Jan 1, 2005) in an area of 42.52 km^{2} (16.42 sq mi). As of 2016 the population was 496 residents. Its altitude is 910 m (2,990 ft) above sea level.

Its postal code is 37724.

The 15th of August is the big festival of the town, which celebrates the "Virgen of the Ascension". After this, no other festival is as important as that of September 14–15, "The Holy Christ of the Afflicted".
