= Dactylispa viatoris =

Scientific classification
- Kingdom: Animalia
- Phylum: Arthropoda
- Class: Insecta
- Order: Coleoptera
- Suborder: Polyphaga
- Infraorder: Cucujiformia
- Family: Chrysomelidae
- Genus: Dactylispa
- Species: D. viatoris

Binomial name
- Dactylispa viatoris Uhmann, 1934

Species of beetle

Dactylispa viatoris is a species of beetle of the family Chrysomelidae. It is found in Zimbabwe.

== Life history ==
The recorded host plant for this species is Castilla elastica.
