= Cantagalo =

Cantagalo may refer to:

== São Tomé and Príncipe ==
- Cantagalo District, a district on São Tomé Island

== Brazil ==
- Cantagalo, Minas Gerais, a municipality
- Cantagalo, Paraná, a municipality
- Cantagalo, Rio de Janeiro, a city
- Cantagalo, Niterói, a subdivision of Niterói
- Cantagalo–Pavão–Pavãozinho, a favela of Rio de Janeiro

== See also ==
- Cantagallo (disambiguation)
