= Valdefuentes =

Valdefuentes may refer to several places in Spain:

- Valdefuentes, Cáceres, in the province of Cáceres in Extremadura
- Valdefuentes de Sangusín, in the province of Salamanca in Castile and León
- Valdefuentes del Páramo, in the province of León in Castile and León
- Valdefuentes (Madrid), a ward of Hortaleza district, Madrid
