= La Hoya =

La Hoya may refer to:

- La Hoya, Salamanca, a small municipality of Salamanca province, Spain
- La Hoya, Alava, an important Bronze-Iron Age town of Biasteri (Alava, Basque Country)
- La Hoya, Veracruz, former name of Acajete, Veracruz, Mexico
- La Hoya, or La Hoia, Chihuahua, Mexico

== See also ==
- La Jolla, San Diego, California
