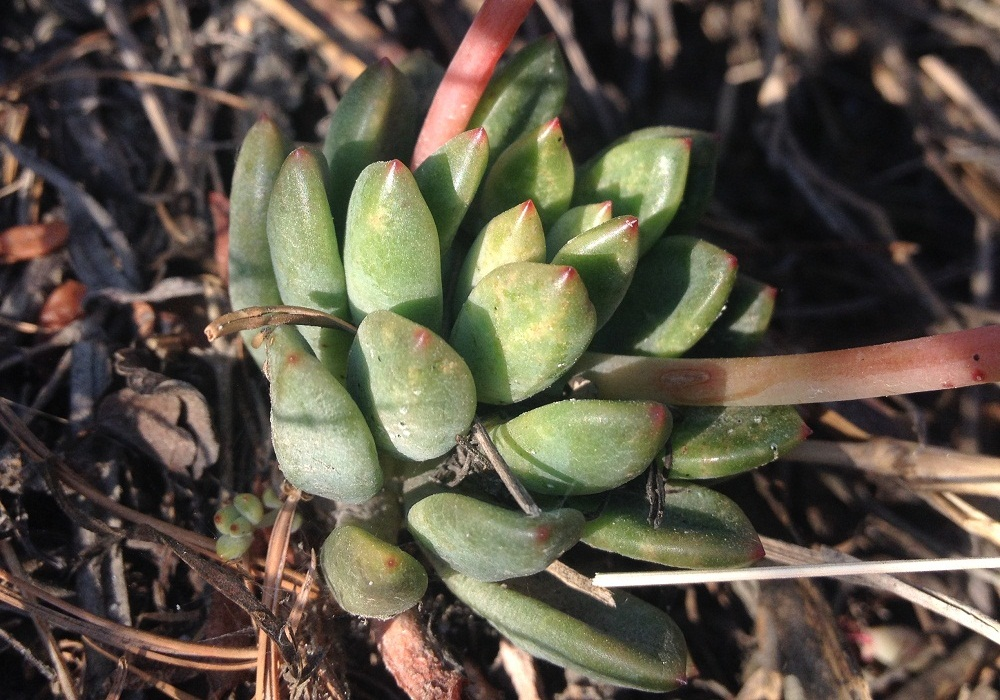
- Echeveria amoena

Scientific classification
- Kingdom: Plantae
- Clade: Tracheophytes
- Clade: Angiosperms
- Clade: Eudicots
- Order: Saxifragales
- Family: Crassulaceae
- Genus: Echeveria
- Species: E. amoena

Binomial name
- Echeveria amoena De Smet ex É.Morren

Synonyms
- Echeveria microcalyx Britton & Rose (1911); Echeveria purpusii Britton (1905) (Basionym); Echeveria pusilla Berger (1904)

= Echeveria amoena =

Species of succulent

Echeveria amoena is a species of succulent plant in the family Crassulaceae, endemic to semi-arid areas of the Mexican states of Puebla, Tlaxcala, and Veracruz.

== Description ==
It is a herbaceous, perennial plant with a stem up to 8 cm long. It grows in the form of a compact rosette, commonly less than 5 cm in diameter, with fleshy, obovate-oblanceolate, full-margin and accumulated apex leaves.

The inflorescence is a simple, reddish zinc, 10 to 22.5 cm high, with several alternate ascending, succulent, green, reddish or pink-orange bracts. The corolla includes petals similar to bracts.

== Taxonomy ==
Echeveria amoena was described in 1875 by Charles Jacques Édouard Morren, attributed to Louis De Smet, in Annales de Botanique et d'Horticulture.

Echeveria amoena also forms the hybrid Echeveria subalpina × amoena, which is considered by some authors as the species E. meyraniana.

=== Etymology ===
Echeveria : generic name given in honor of Mexican botanical artist Atanasio Echeverría y Godoy (1771? –1803)
amoena : epithet Latin meaning "pleasant" or "lovely"

== Gallery ==
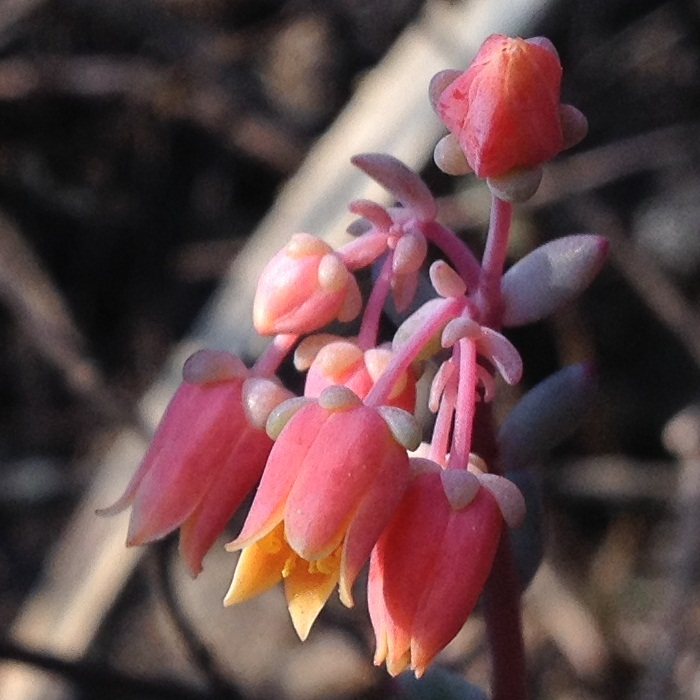
Echeveria amoena flowers
