= Francisco Hernández expedition (1570–1577) =

Spanish scientific expedition

The Francisco Hernández expedition (Spanish: Comisión de Francisco Hernández a Nueva España) is considered to be the first scientific expedition to the New World, led by Francisco Hernández de Toledo, a naturalist and physician of the Court of King Philip II, who was highly regarded in Spain because of his works on herbal medicine.

Among some of the most important achievements of the expedition were the discovery and subsequent introduction in Europe of a number of new plants that did not exist in the Old World, but that quickly gained acceptance and become very popular among European consumers, such as pineapples, cocoa, corn, and many others.

== Expedition ==
In 1570 Hernández was appointed Archiater physician for the New World and commended by the King to embark on a scientific expedition to study the region's medicinal plants. Hernandez set sail for the New World in August 1571, taking along his son, and landed in February 1572 in Veracruz. For three years he toured Mexico and Central America together with a geographer, painters, botanists and native doctors, collecting and classifying botanical specimens. He also studied the culture and medical achievements of the native Nahua peoples, taking notes and preparing numerous illustrations assisted by three indigenous painters who had been baptized as Antón, Baltazar Elías and Pedro Vázquez.

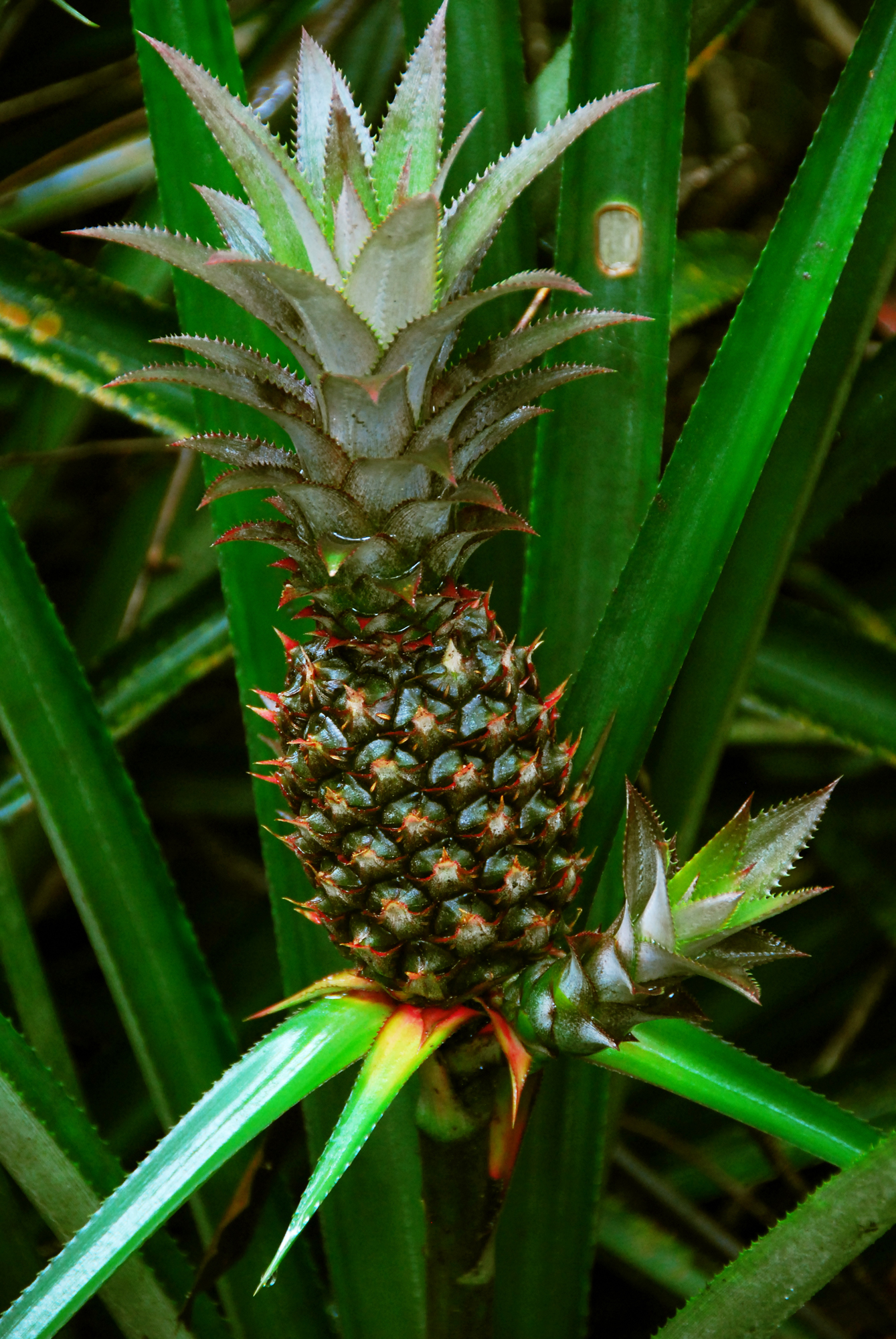
Pineapple fruit

Among the plants the expedition encountered and described were pineapples, cocoa (known by the locals as Cacahuatl), corn, Guaiacum officinale, Smilax regelii, Strychnos nux-vomica (known by the locals as Mahuatl Quauhtlepatli), sweet granadilla, passionfruit, and several plants with hallucinogenic properties used in rituals such as peyote, maguey, and Datura or devil's weed.

From March 1574 until his return to Spain in 1577, Hernandez lived in Mexico, where he carried out medical tests using the plants he had gathered, put together a large botanical collection, and studied local medicinal practices and archeological sites. The result was an impressive work, composed of 24 books on plants, one about the fauna, one on minerals, and ten volumes of paintings and illustrations that were brought to Spain to be published. José de Acosta calculated that the total cost of the expedition represented about 60,000 ducats, an enormous sum at the time.

During the 1576 outbreak of the epidemic known as cocoliztli, Nahuatl for "pest", during the colonial-period population decline of the Aztecs, Hernández performed autopsies in the Hospital Real de San José de los Naturales in collaboration with surgeon Alonso López de Hinojosos and physician Juan de la Fuente. Hernandez described the gruesome symptoms with clinical accuracy. These included high fever, severe headache, vertigo, black tongue, dark urine, dysentery, severe abdominal and thoracic pain, large nodules behind the ears that often invaded the neck and face, acute neurologic disorders, and profuse bleeding from the nose, eyes, and mouth, with death frequently occurring in 3 to 4 days.

== Publications ==
Hernández returned to Spain in 1577 carrying with him a large number of seeds and live plants. He prepared a brief introduction that was printed, but died before he could see his complete work published. All the material had been preserved at the Royal Monastery of San Lorenzo del Escorial, where a large part of his original manuscript was lost in a fire almost a century later. Because Hernández's work included numerous descriptions of unknown plants and names that appeared incomprehensible, King Philip II appointed Nardo Antonio Recchi, Archiater physician of Napoles, to prepare a compilation of the texts for publication. Recchi grouped all descriptions of plants into eight groups according to their common morphology and differentiated those plants that were believed to be useful to cure what was then known in Spain as "The French Disease" that had infected millions in Europe. However, after Recchi died his work remained unpublished and was ultimately purchased by Federico Angelo Cesi, an Italian scientist, naturalist, and founder of the Accademia dei Lincei.

The compilation was finally published in Mexico in 1615 as Quatro libros de la Naturaleza, y virtudes de las plantas y animales que están reunidos en el uso de Medicina en la Nueva España, y el Método, y corrección, y preparación, que para administrallas se requiere con lo que el Doctor Francisco Hernández escribió en lengua latina by the Dominican priest Francisco Ximénez, who had managed to obtain a copy of the Latin manuscript prepared by Recchi.

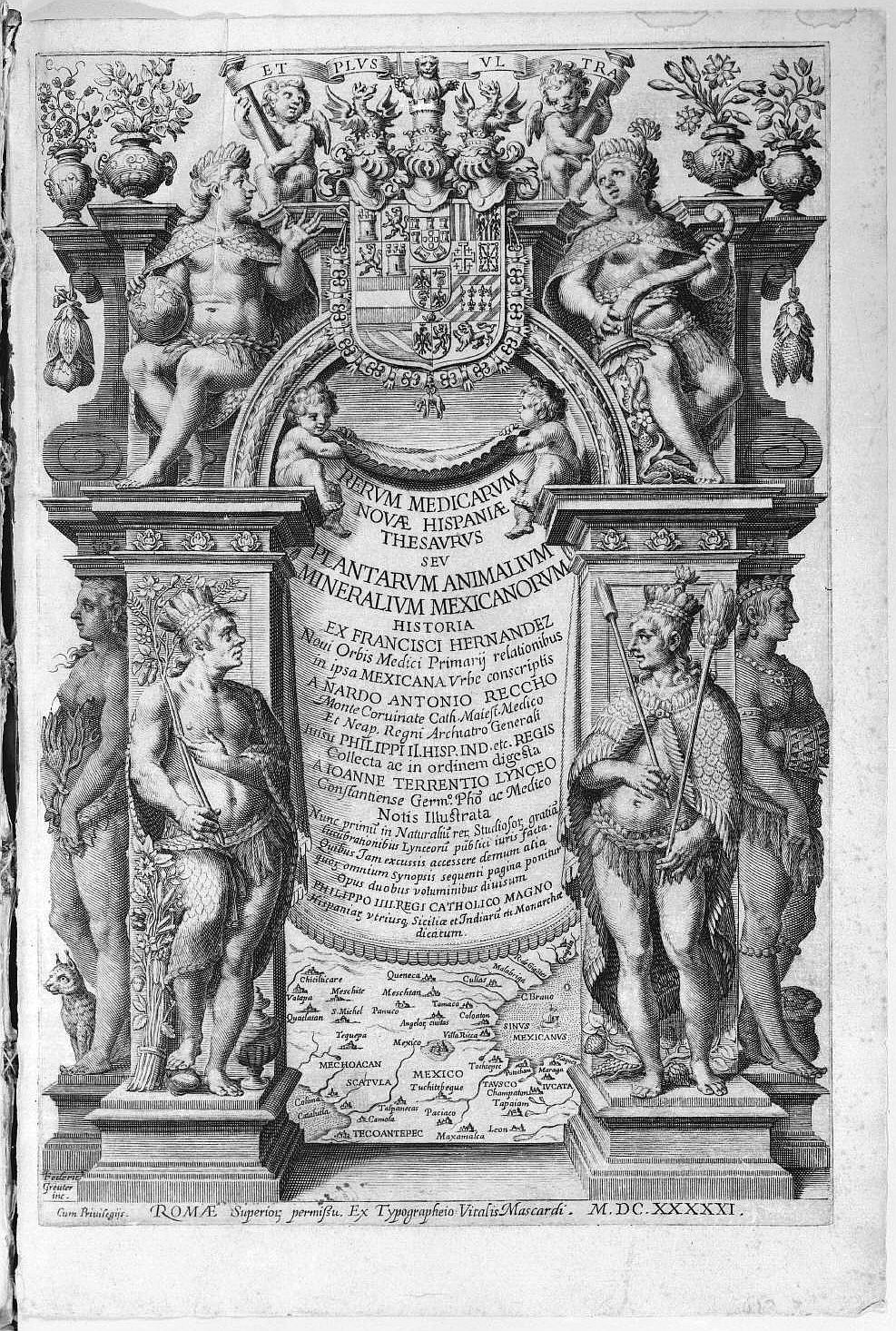
Rerum medicarum Novae Hispaniae thesaurus

Federico Cesi published a heavily redacted a compendium of Recchi's Latin version in Rome on 1628, titled Rerum medicarum Novae Hispaniae thesaurus, with notes and additions by Johann Schreck, Fabio Colonna, Johann Schmidt, and Cesi himself. After Cesi's death another edition was published in 1648 by Johannes Schreck and Fabio Colonna as Nova plantarum, animalium et mineralium mexicanorum historia a Francisco Hernández in indis primum compilata, de inde a Nardo Antonio Reccho in volumen digesta.

Another compilation by physician Casimiro Gómez Ortega, based on additional material found in the Colegio Imperial de los Jesuitas de Madrid was published in 1790 under the name Francisci Hernandi, medici atque historici Philippi II, hispan et indiar. Regis, et totius novi orbis archiatri. Opera, cum edita, tum medita, ad autobiographi fidem et jusu regio. The finding of the material greatly helped convince King Charles III of Spain, to authorize a major botanical expedition that was to be known as the Royal Botanical Expedition to New Spain led by Martín Sessé y Lacasta.

His works were also translated to English in 2000 under the title The Mexican Treasury: The Writings of Dr. Francisco Hernández, accompanied by Searching for the Secrets of Nature: The Life and Works of Dr. Francisco Hernández that contains information about the life and works of Hernández.

== Sources ==
- Alfredo de Micheli-Serra. Médicos y medicina en la Nueva España del Siglo XVI. Gaceta Médica de México. May/June 2001, vol.137, no.3 (accessed 16 November 2005 available on the World Wide Web). ISSN 0016-3813
- Fundació Catalunya-Amèrica Sant Jeroni de la Murtra revista RE (Edición castellano), "El preguntador" Época 5. número 45. pp. 57–60. julio de 1999 Accessed November 16, 2005.
