= Castilla ulei =

Conservation status
- Least Concern (IUCN 3.1)

Scientific classification
- Kingdom: Plantae
- Clade: Tracheophytes
- Clade: Angiosperms
- Clade: Eudicots
- Clade: Rosids
- Order: Rosales
- Family: Moraceae
- Genus: Castilla
- Species: C. ulei

Binomial name
- Castilla ulei Warb.

Species of tree

Castilla ulei, called caucho negro in Spanish or amora-vermelha-da-Amazônia in Portuguese (meaning Amazonian red mulberry), is a tree in the family Moraceae, native to South America, specifically in the Amazon rainforest.

Latex obtained from the trunk of this tree is used locally to make rubber.

== See also ==
- Castilla elastica
- Hevea brasiliensis
- Ericameria nauseosa
- Landolphia dawei
- Landolphia hirsuta
- Landolphia owariensis
- Parthenium argentatum
- Taraxacum kok-saghyz
