= La Covatilla =

Ski resort in Spain

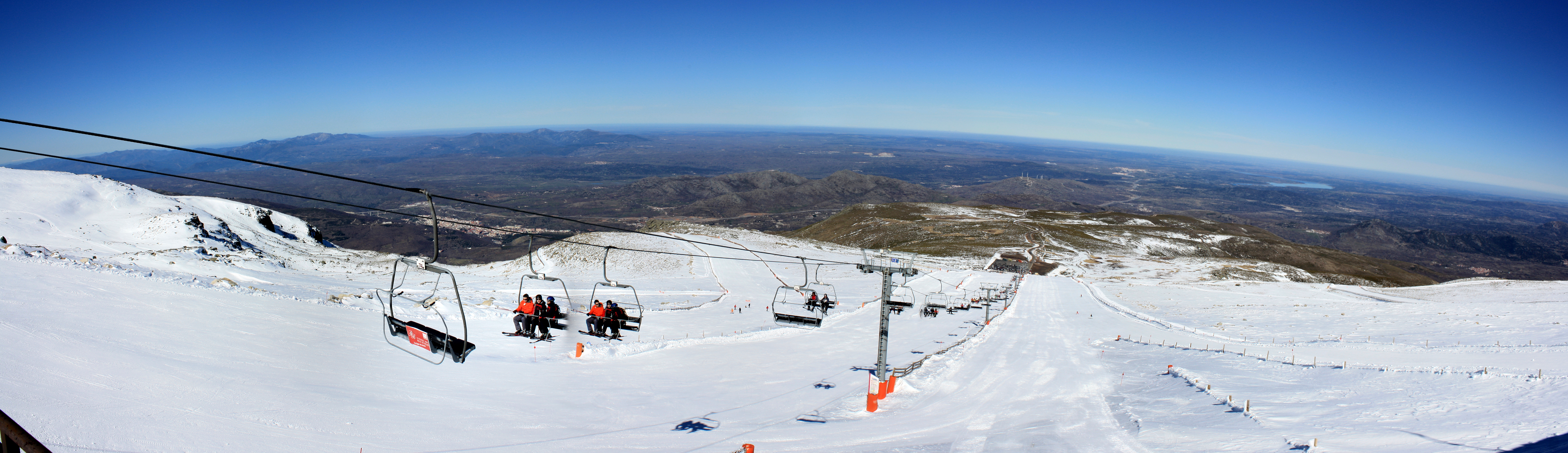
- Panoramic view of La Covatilla

- Location within Spain
- Location: La Hoya
- Nearest city: Béjar, Spain
- Coordinates: 40.3541°N 5.6901°W
- Top elevation: 2,368 m (7,769 ft)
- Base elevation: 2,000 m (6,600 ft)
- Website: www.sierradebejar-lacovatilla.com

La Covatilla is a ski resort in the Central System of the Province of Salamanca, in Castile and León, Spain. The resort is in the municipality of La Hoya.

== Cycling ==
The resort is known for having held a stage finish, on several occasions, of the Vuelta a España. The climb, that begins in Béjar, is over a distance of 19.9 km (12.4 mi) at an average gradient of 5.8%, with sections of up to 16.4%.

Edition	Winner
2002	Santiago Blanco (ESP)
2004	Félix Cárdenas (COL)
2006	Danilo Di Luca (ITA)
2011	Dan Martin (IRL)
2018	Benjamin King (USA)
2020	David Gaudu (FRA)
