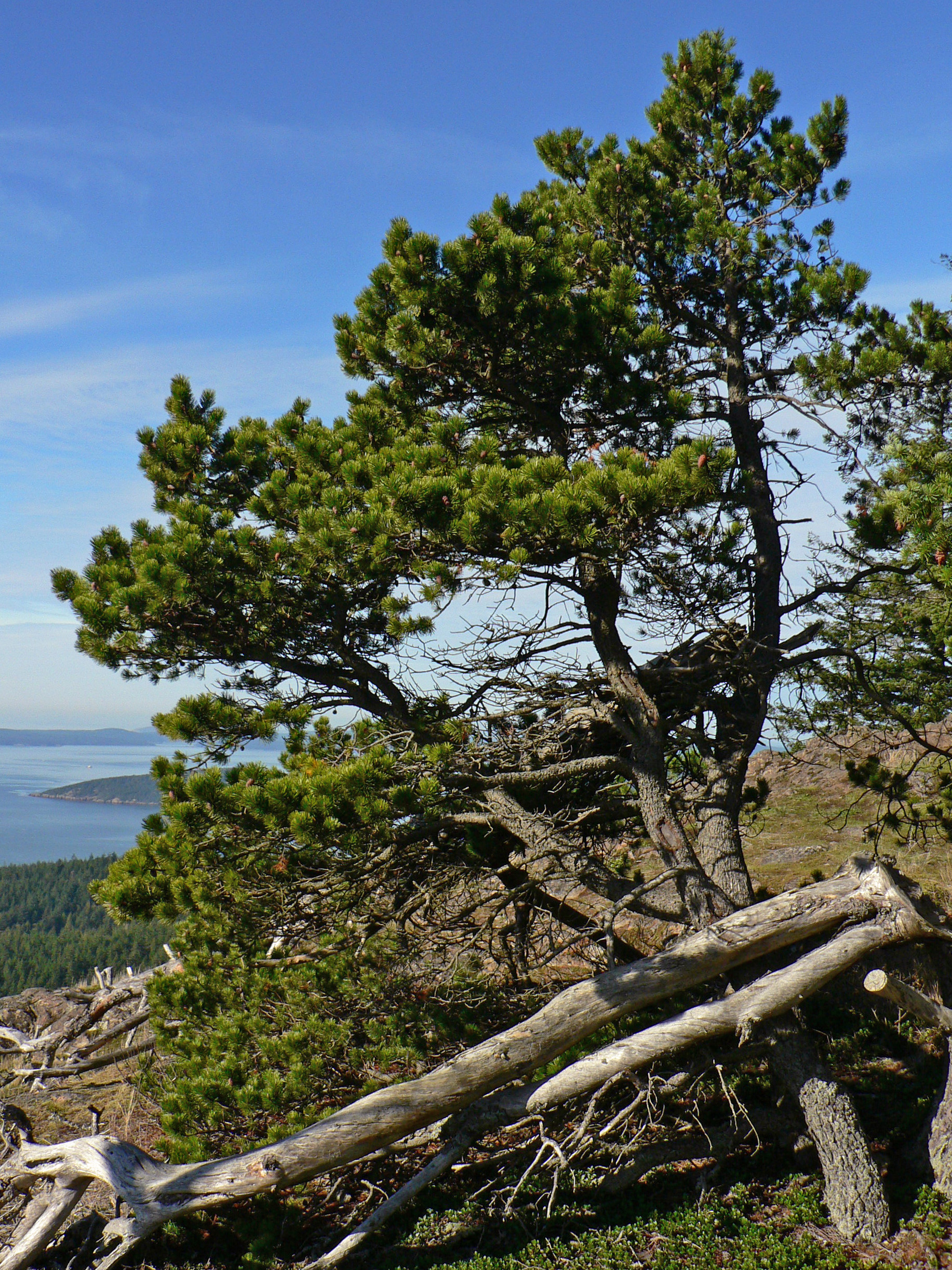
- Pinus contorta subsp. contorta in Anacortes Community Forest Lands, Washington

Conservation status
- Least Concern (IUCN 3.1)

- Secure (NatureServe)

Scientific classification
- Kingdom: Plantae
- Clade: Tracheophytes
- Clade: Gymnosperms
- Division: Pinophyta
- Class: Pinopsida
- Order: Pinales
- Family: Pinaceae
- Genus: Pinus
- Subgenus: P. subg. Pinus
- Section: P. sect. Trifoliae
- Subsection: P. subsect. Contortae
- Species: P. contorta

Binomial name
- Pinus contorta Douglas

Subspecies
- 4, see text
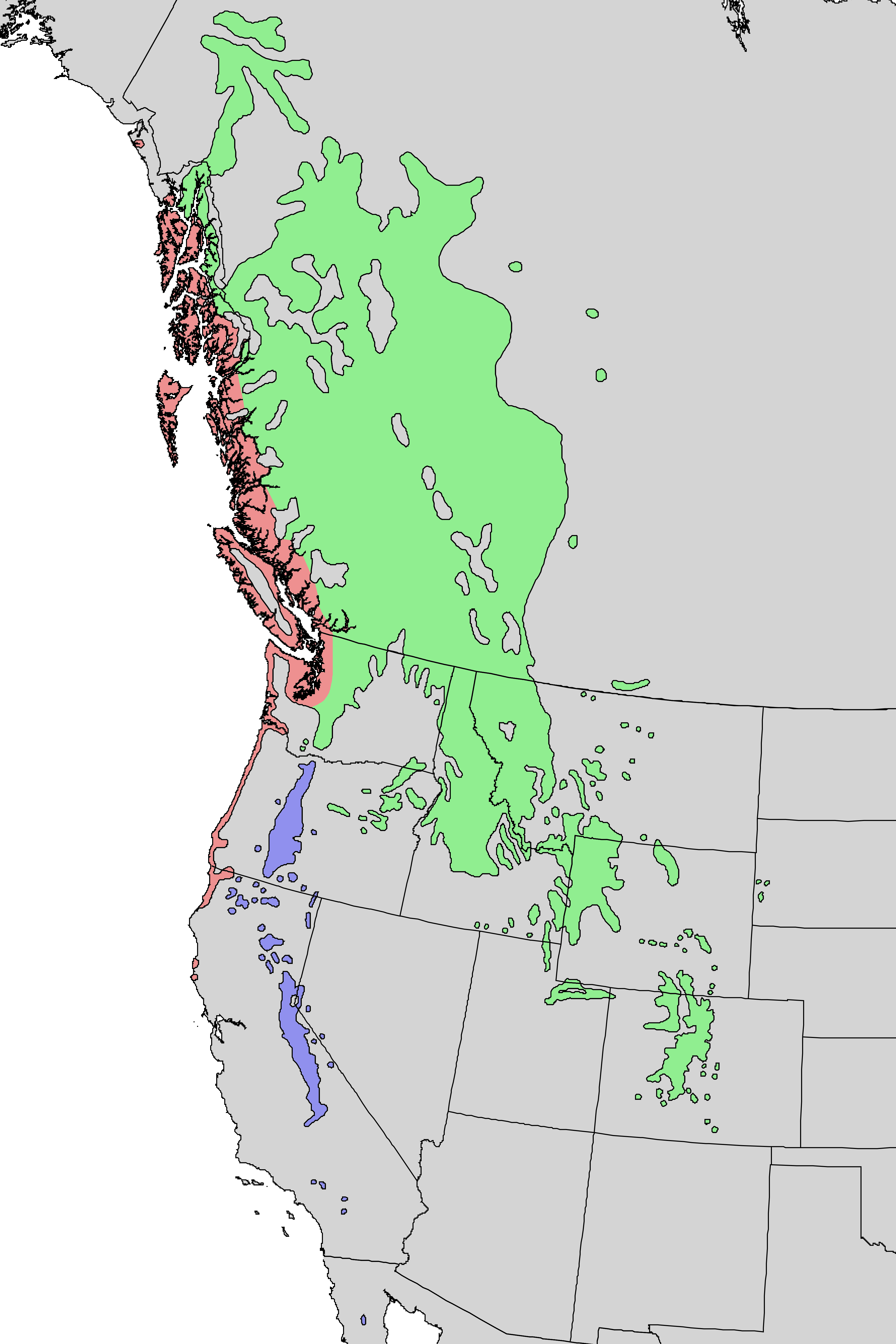
- Distribution map: Pinus contorta subsp. contorta; P. contorta subsp. latifolia; P. contorta subsp. murrayana

= Pinus contorta =

Lodgepole pine

Species of plant

Pinus contorta, the lodgepole pine, shore pine, twisted pine, or contorta pine, is a species of conifer in the family Pinaceae. It is a common pine in western North America, found near the ocean shore and in dry montane forests to the subalpine, but is rare in lowland rain forests.

== Description ==
Depending on subspecies, Pinus contorta grows as a coniferous shrub or tree. The shrub form is krummholz and is approximately 1 to 3 meters (3 to 10 ft) high. The thin and narrow-crowned tree can grow 40 to 50 m (130 to 160 ft) high and achieve up to 2 m (7 ft) in diameter at chest height. The murrayana subspecies is the tallest. The crown is rounded and the top of the tree is flattened. In dense forests, the tree has a slim, conical crown. The formation of twin trees is common in some populations in British Columbia. The elastic branches stand upright or overhang and are difficult to break. The branches are covered with short shoots that are easy to remove.

The species name is contorta because of the twisted, bent pines (shore pine) found at coastal areas and the tree's twisted needles. Pinus contorta is occasionally known under several English names: black pine, scrub pine, and coast pine. P. contorta subsp. latifolia will hybridise with the closely related jack pine (P. banksiana).

The bark of lodgepole pine is thin, scaly and grayish brown. Shore pine bark is somewhat thick and corky, fissuring into a checkered pattern. Some lodgepole pines have been reported in low elevations with features closer to those of the shore pine, including the bark.

Tamarack pine can grow up to centuries old and lodgepole pines in Yellowstone Park have survived over 300 years.

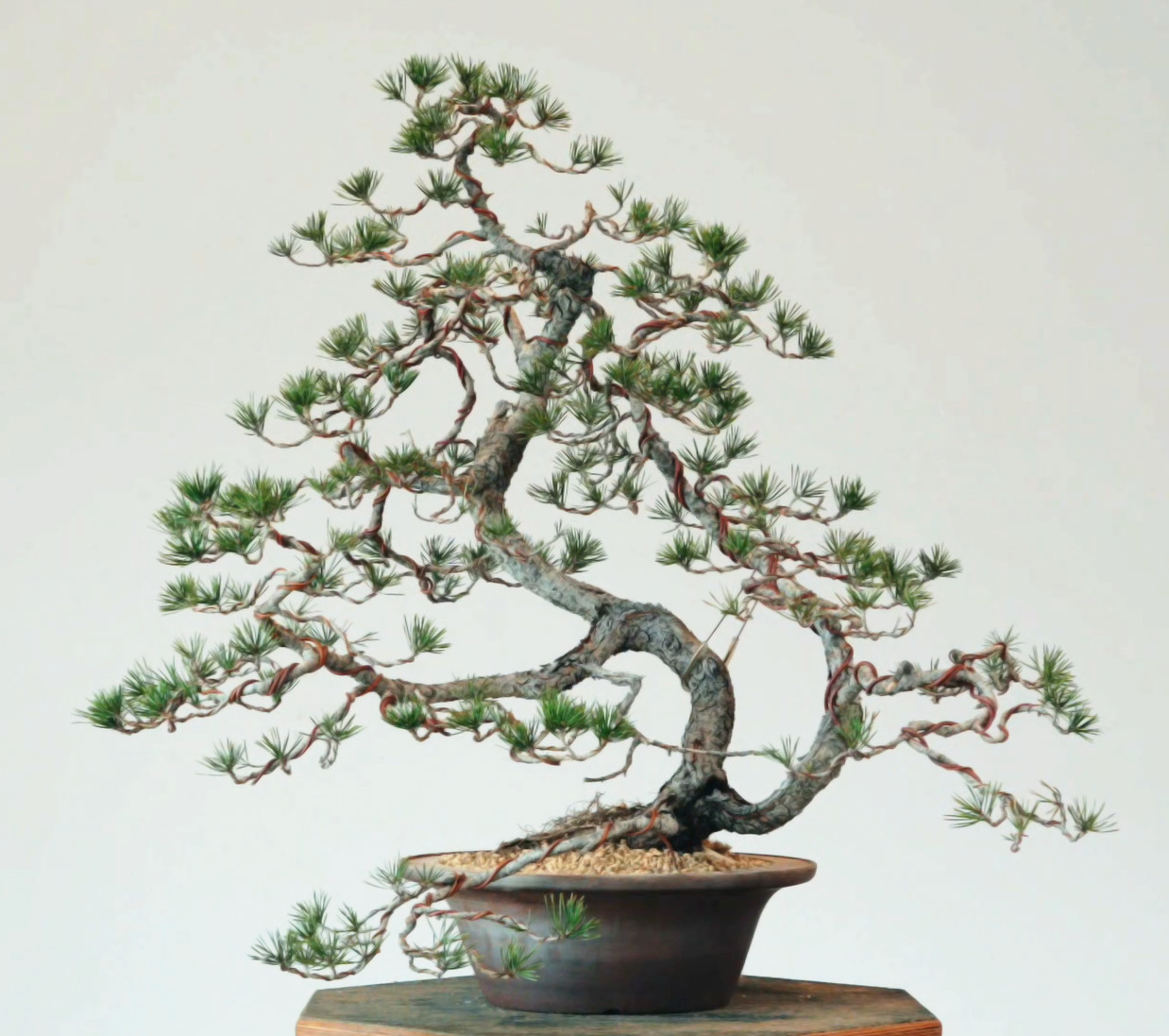
Lodgepole pine being trained as bonsai. Notice the use of wire to position the branches of the tree. This is a yamadori (wild collected specimen) and has been styled by American bonsai artist Bjorn Bjorholm.

=== Foliage ===
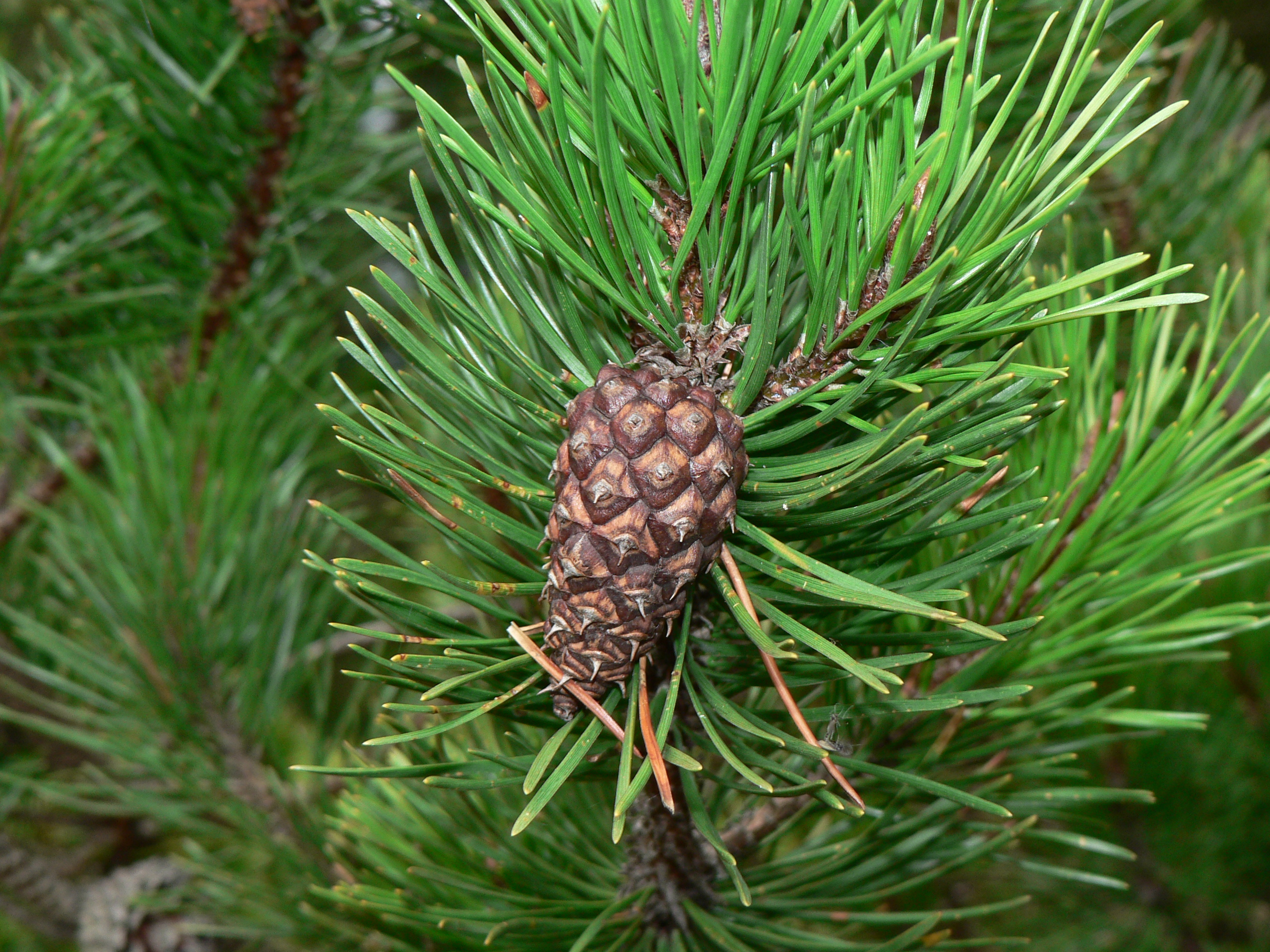
The needles are 4 to 8 cm (1 1/2 to 3 in) long in fascicles of two, alternate on twigs. The female cones are 3 to 7 cm (1 to 3 in) long with sharp-tipped scales.

The egg-shaped growth buds are reddish-brown and between 20 and 30 millimeters (3/4 and 1 1/4 in) long. They are short pointed, slightly rotated, and very resinous. Spring growth starts in beginning of April and the annual growth is completed by early July. The dark and mostly shiny needles are pointed and 4 to 8 centimeters (1 1/2 to 3 in) long and 0.9 to 2 mm (1/32 to 3/32 in) wide. The needle edge is weakly to strongly serrated. The needles are in pairs on short shoots and rotated about the shoots' longitudinal axes. In Alberta above 2,000 m (6,600 ft), 1 to 5 needles occur per short shoot. A population with a high proportion of three-needled short shoots occurs in the Yukon. Needles live an average of four to six years, with a maximum of 13 years. The foliage of lodgepole pine is yellow-green as compared to shore pine, which is dark green.

=== Cones ===
The cones of lodgepole and shore pine begin to be produced when the trees are about ten years old. The cones are 3–7 cm (1–3 in) long, with prickles on the scales.

Many populations of the Rocky Mountain subspecies, P. contorta subsp. latifolia, have serotinous cones. This means that the cones are closed and must be exposed to high temperatures, such as from forest fires, in order to open and release their seeds. The variation in their serotiny has been correlated with wildfires and mountain pine beetle attacks. The cones of the coastal Pacific subspecies, P. contorta subsp. contorta, are typically non-serotinous, and those of the inland Pacific subspecies, P. contorta subsp. murrayana, are completely non-serotinous. Sometimes cones will become buried by the continued growth of a branch. If the seeds are collected, they have germinated as much as 150 years after confinement.

== Distribution ==
Pinus contorta occurs from upper, dry montane forests to the subalpine region of western North America. It can be found on the western side of the Cascades, in inland British Columbia, and on the Rocky Mountains in Alberta, except where it is too high and dry. Lodgepole pine can tolerate relatively hostile environments such as high-elevation volcanic rock in Central Oregon (e.g. Crater Lake) and thin soils on the eastern slope of the Cascades. Further south, the species can be found in higher elevations up to 3,350 m (10,990 ft) above sea level, particularly in southern Colorado. It is rare in lowland rain forests. Shore pine can be found in very infertile soils in coastal regions from Southeast Alaska to Northern California.

Lodgepole and shore pine can be found intermingled (and apparently hybridized) north of Puget Sound. Less dependent on fire, tamarack pine can be found in California's upper mountains and mingled with lodgepole in Oregon. Pinus contorta can be found in the closed-cone pine forest of coastal California.

== Ecology ==
Pinus contorta is a fire-adapted species, often regenerating densely following wildfire. The species displays characteristically poor self pruning and thin bark, features which often lead to a high rate of mortality following fire. Importantly however, the heat from fire results in the opening of serotinous cones and the release of seeds. This in turn allows the species to regenerate well following catastrophic fire, and maintain its place in forest landscapes as an early successional species. Some populations do sustain themselves in the absence of regular fire, where wind through, ice storms, and land slides also act as stand replacing disturbances.

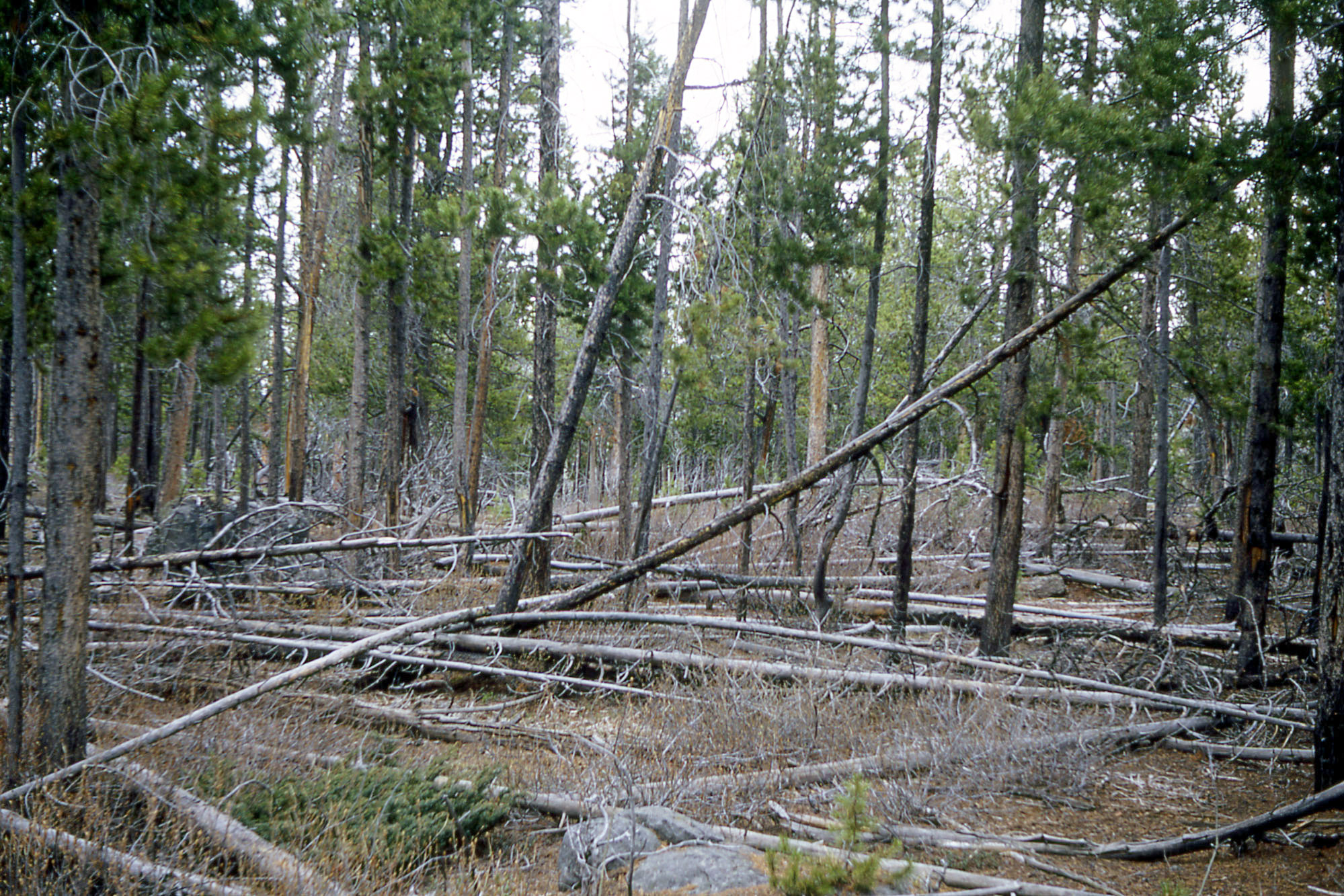

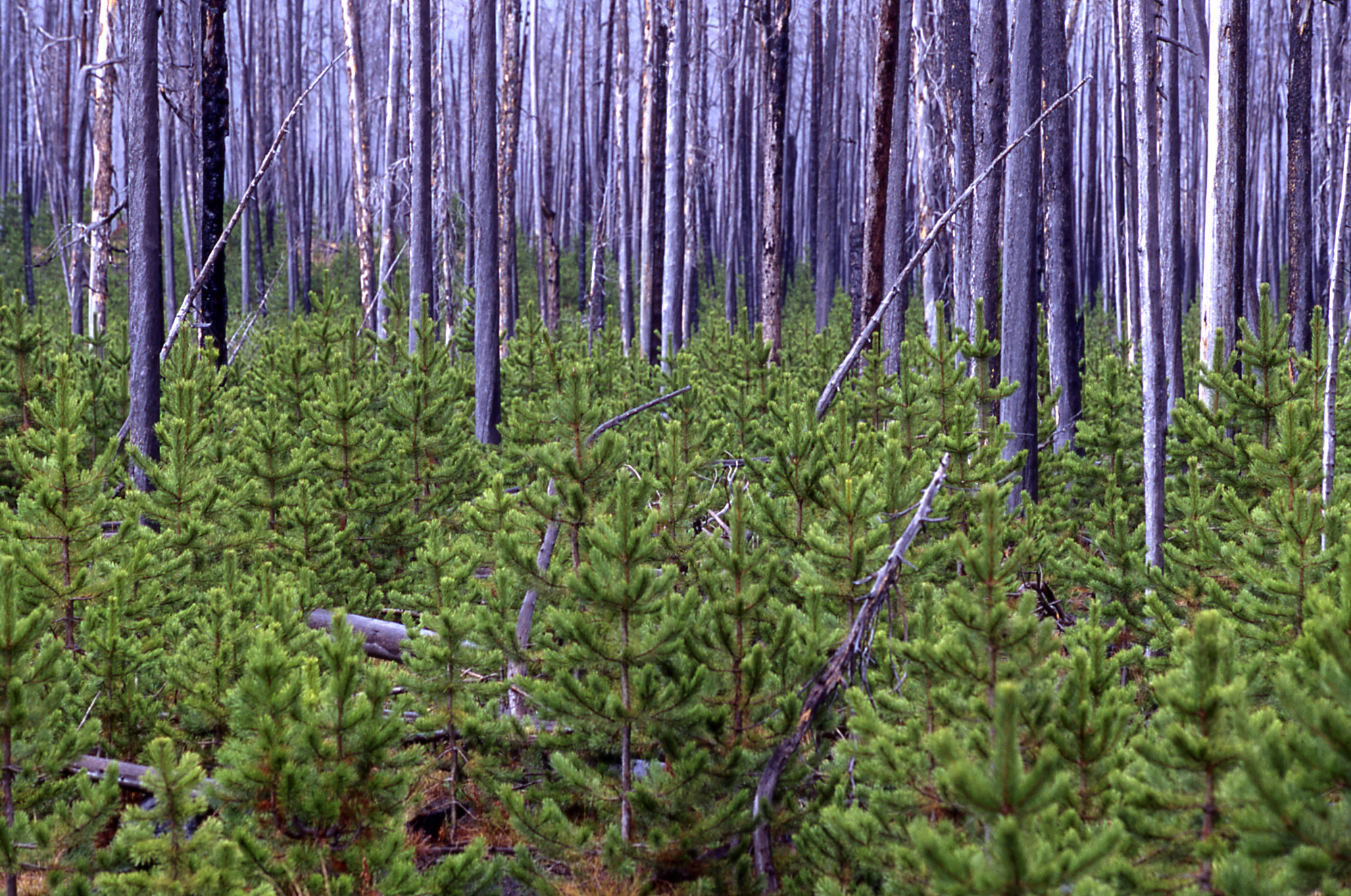
P. contorta subsp. latifolia forest 23 years before (above) and 10 years after (below) the Yellowstone fires of 1988

The natural fire regime for this species is primarily driven by climate. The fires occur most often after years of drought. Forests in the upper montane to subalpine region experience much moisture in the winter via snow. The density of tree stands with the species inhibit the establishment of an understory (allowing ladder fuel to form), and surface fire is rare regardless. Thus, infrequent but severe fires dominate this species.

An example of the climate that plays a huge role in the fire regime of the species is quite complex. There are three different oscillations that play a major role in droughts. These are the Pacific decadal oscillation (PDO), Atlantic multidecadal oscillation (AMO) and El Niño (ENSO). A combination of these oscillations being in effect (+) or not in effect (−) have a global effect on the water available to these forests. The combination of AMO +, ENSO − and PDO − means there is going to be a drought and likely a severe subalpine fire.

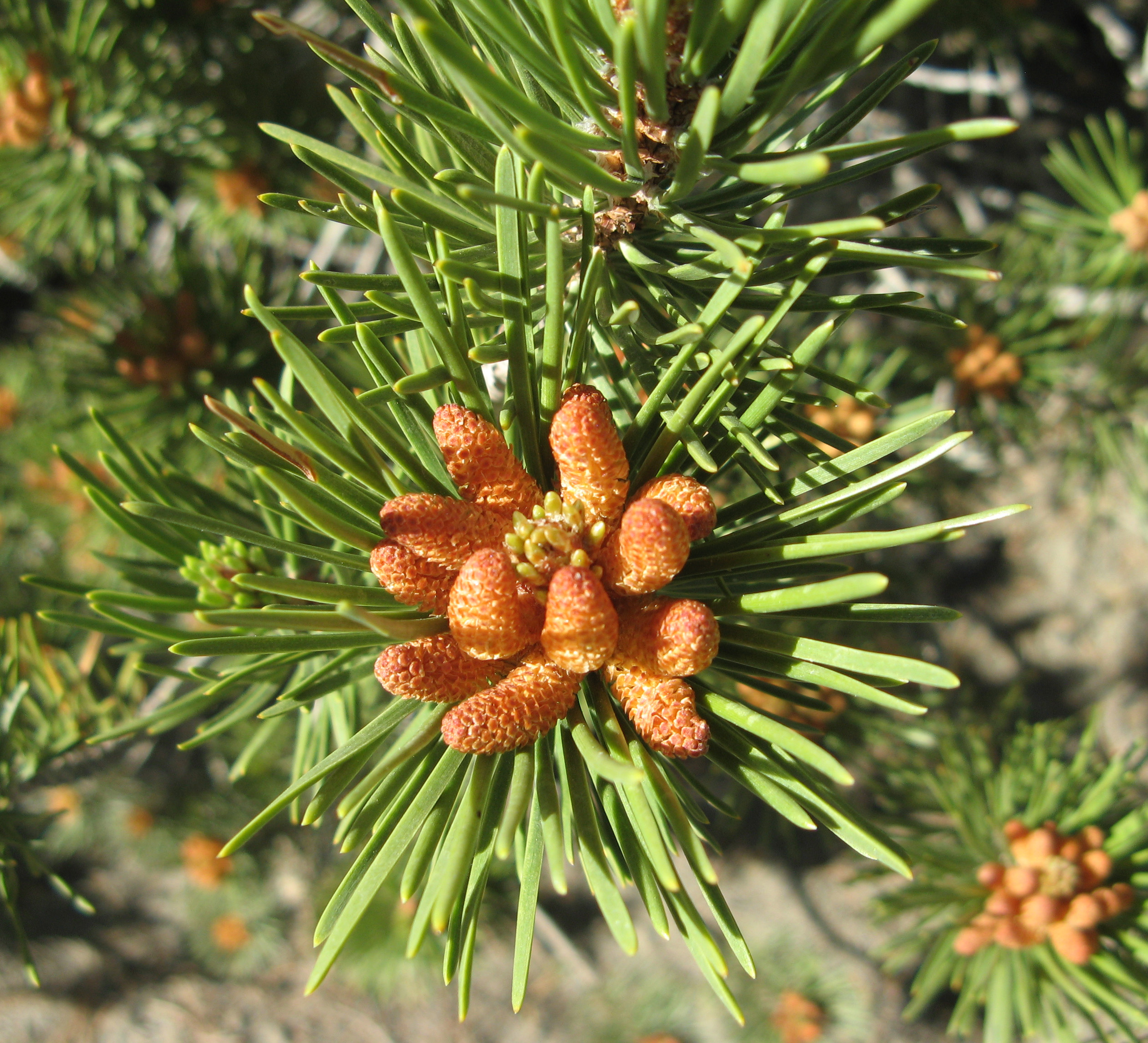
A cluster of pollen-bearing male cones at Mount San Antonio

Suillus tomentosus, a fungus, produces specialized structures called tuberculate ectomycorrhizae with the roots of lodgepole pine (Pinus contorta var. latifolia). These structures have been shown to be the location of concentrations of nitrogen-fixing bacteria which contribute a significant amount of nitrogen to tree growth and allow the pines to colonize nutrient-poor sites.

Porcupines consume the inner bark of lodgepole pine.

=== Threats ===
Larger members of the species are attacked by mountain pine beetles, which it fights with pitch but can be overwhelmed. It is also affected by blue stain fungus (Grosmannia clavigera), which the mountain pine beetle carries in its mouth. Dwarf mistletoe also leeches off the species. Both the threat of pine beetles and dwarf mistletoe are curbed by wildfires, which occurred less in the 20th century due to firefighting. More recently, unthreatening lightning-sparked fires have been allowed to burn in wilderness areas in Idaho and Montana. Exceptional cold can kill some of the beetles.

A study released in 2011 concluded that Pinus contorta could experience significant reductions in distribution due to climate change by the late 21st century.

=== As an invasive species ===
Pinus contorta is considered a serious invasive species of wilding conifer in New Zealand, along with several other western North American pine species. It is listed on the National Pest Plant Accord and is prohibited from sale, commercial propagation, and distribution.

== Subspecies ==
There are four subspecies of Pinus contorta, and one of them is sometimes considered to have two varieties. The subspecies are sometimes treated at the rank of variety.

Cone	Image	Subspecies	Common name	Distribution
		Pinus contorta subsp. bolanderi	Bolander's beach pine, Bolander pine, Also treated as Pinus contorta subsp. contorta var. bolanderi, in which case what is treated here as Pinus contorta subsp. contorta is the variety Pinus contorta subsp. contorta var. contorta.	endemic to Mendocino County on the northwestern California coast; near threatened by fires and development
		Pinus contorta subsp. contorta	shore pine	Pacific Coast, southern Alaska to northwest California.
		Pinus contorta subsp. murrayana	tamarack pine, or Sierra lodgepole pine	Cascade Range from Oregon into northern California; the Sierra Nevada, the Transverse Ranges of southern California (including the San Bernardino Mountains, the Peninsular Ranges into northern Baja California, and the Spring Mountains of southern Nevada).
		Pinus contorta subsp. latifolia	lodgepole pine	Rocky Mountains, Colorado to Yukon and Saskatchewan; aspen parkland and boreal forests.

== Uses ==
=== Construction ===
The common name "lodgepole pine" comes from the custom of Native Americans using the tall, straight trees to construct lodges (tepees) in the Rocky Mountain area. Lodgepole pine was used by European settlers to build log cabins. Logs are still used in rural areas as posts, fences, lumber, and firewood. Shore pine pitch has historically been used as glue.

Tree plantations of Pinus contorta have been planted extensively in Norway, Sweden, Ireland and the UK for forestry, such as timber uses. In Iceland it is used for reforestation and afforestation purposes. It is also commonly used for pressure-treated lumber throughout North America.

=== Food ===
Native Americans consumed the inner bark of lodgepole pine to prevent starvation for themselves and their horses. The lodgepole pine cambium layer's edibility is dependent on thickness, consistency, and sweetness.

=== Medicinal ===
The indigenous peoples of the Pacific Northwest and of California used different parts of the plant internally and externally as a traditional medicine for various ailments. The gum of shore pine was used medicinally as well as for chewing.

=== Cultivation ===
Pinus contorta is cultivated as an ornamental tree by the horticulture industry. Plant nurseries grow Pinus contorta subsp. contorta and Pinus contorta subsp. murrayana for use in traditional and wildlife gardens, and as smaller selections of the native plant for natural landscaping. The shore pine's smaller varieties and cultivars are also used in container gardening, including as large bonsai specimens.

Cultivars of this species include:

- "Chief Joseph", a dwarf variety of Pinus contorta var. latifolia grown for its yellow winter needles
- "Spaan's Dwarf", a dwarf variety of Pinus contorta var. contorta that grows wider than it grows tall

The cultivar "Chief Joseph" has gained the Royal Horticultural Society's Award of Garden Merit.

=== Emblem ===
Lodgepole pine is the provincial tree of Alberta, Canada.
