= Martín Sessé y Lacasta =

Spanish botanist (1751-1808)

- Born: December 11, 1751; Baraguás, Aragon, Spain
- Died: October 4, 1808 (aged 56); Madrid
- Occupation: Botanist

Martín Sessé y Lacasta (December 11, 1751 – October 4, 1808) was a Spanish botanist, who relocated to New Spain (now Mexico) during the 18th century to study and classify the flora of the territory. The standard author abbreviation Sessé is used to indicate this person as the author when citing a botanical name.

== Background ==
Sessé studied medicine in Zaragoza, then moved to Madrid in 1775. In 1779 he became a military physician, in which capacity he visited Cuba, and later New Spain. In 1785 he was named a commissioner of the Royal Botanical Garden in New Spain. At the same time a botanical garden and a course of study on the flora of Mexico at the Royal and Pontifical University of Mexico (now UNAM) were authorized. Sessé stopped practicing medicine in order to devote all his energies to botany.

== The botanical expedition ==
In 1786 Charles III, King of Spain, authorized a major botanical expedition known as the Royal Botanical Expedition to New Spain, that was proposed by Sessé at a time when most of the flora and fauna of Mexico were unknown to European science. Sessé became the head of the expedition and of the botanical garden.

His preparation for the expedition began in 1787. It was extensive, and took some time. He visited Santo Domingo, Puerto Rico, and Cuba, where similar (though smaller) studies had already been undertaken, to collaborate and learn. In Cuba he collaborated in the search for a treatment of a parasitic illness that had been spreading rapidly.

Back in New Spain, he was joined by a group of Spanish botanists selected by Casimiro Gómez Ortega, director of the Royal Botanical Garden of Madrid. These included Vicente Cervantes, the first professor of botany in New Spain, who continued to live in the country until his death in 1829; José Longinos Martínez, who organized the Gabinete de Historia Natural, the precursor of the Museum of Natural History; Juan Diego del Castillo, pharmacist and botanist; and José Maldonado. Also among the botanists was José Mariano Mociño, a native of New Spain. Juan Cerda was the official artist of the expedition, and the Mexican Atanasio Echeverría was also one of the artists. The genus Echeveria was named for him.

Various companies of scientists were sent to such widely separated destinations as the Pacific coast of Canada, the Greater Antilles, Yucatán, Nicaragua, and San Francisco. Sessé and Mociño worked mostly in the central part of Mexico. The tasks of the expedition included collecting specimens and having paintings of living plants prepared in the field by accompanying artists. In 1793 Castillo died in Mexico, after he had written Plantas descritas en el viaje de Acapulco. The genus Castilla was named for him by Vicente Cervantes. Although the works of these botanists ended in 1803, it was not until the 1880s that their work was published.

Alexander von Humboldt and his botanist travelling companion Aimé Bonpland were able to examine some of Sessé's and Mociño's results in Mexico in the Museum of Natural History in Madrid before their 1799 departure on their five-year sojourn in Spanish America. However, they did not actually meet Sessé and Mociñno; Humboldt said, "circumstances prevented me from benefiting from the advice of these distinguished scientists, whose insights could have been very useful to me."

== Afterwards ==
After the end of the expedition Sessé returned to Spain with his scientific collections to work on Flora Mexicana, but he died in Madrid in 1808 before publishing it. The scientific collections are held by the Royal Botanical Garden of Madrid (about 7100 herbarium sheets with 200 genera and 3500 new species of plants). The great impact that the results of the expedition had on the botanical community has been documented by the botanical scholar Rogers McVaugh, an expert on the flora of Mexico.

The paintings remained in the possession of Mociño, who accompanied Sessé to Spain after the expedition, but they appeared lost after his death in 1820 in Barcelona, where he settled after living in France and Switzerland during periods of political upheaval in Spain. They had become part of a private library, where they remained unrecognized for their significance until 1980. The Hunt Institute for Botanical Documentation purchased the set, comprising ca. 1800 botanical and ca. 200 zoological subjects, in 1981 from the Torner family. The illustrations are now accessible for study at the Hunt Institute and are available online.

The plant genera Sessea, Sesseopsis, Mocinna, Mozinna, and Mocinnodaphne are named in honor of the expedition leaders.

== Other expeditions ==
The four expeditions authorized by King Charles III to the Spanish colonies were those of Hipólito Ruiz López and José Antonio Pavón to Peru and Chile (1777–88); José Celestino Mutis to New Granada (1783–1808); Juan de Cuéllar to the Philippines (1786–97); and Sessé y Lacasta to New Spain (1787–1803). See also Jean-Louis Berlandier.

== Publications ==
- Sessé, M. y J.M. Mociño, "Flora Mexicana", in La Naturaleza (2nd series, 1891; 2nd ed., 1894).
- Plantae Novae Hispaniae (1889).
