= Cantagallo =

Cantagallo may refer to:

- Cantagallo, Bolívar, Colombia
- Cantagallo, Tuscany, Italy
- Cantagallo, Spain, Spain

== See also ==
- Cantagalo (disambiguation)
