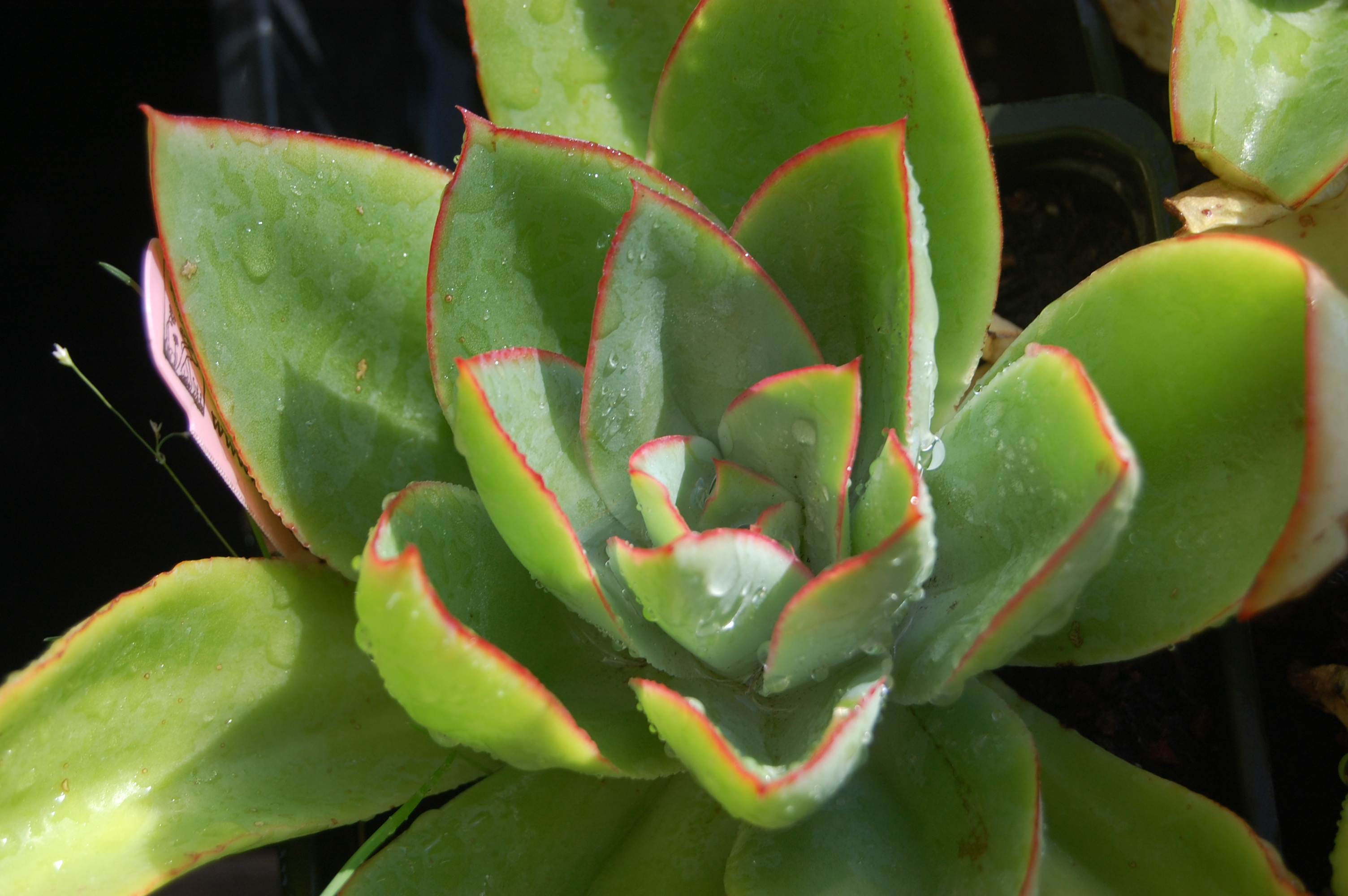

Scientific classification
- Kingdom: Plantae
- Clade: Tracheophytes
- Clade: Angiosperms
- Clade: Eudicots
- Order: Saxifragales
- Family: Crassulaceae
- Genus: Echeveria
- Species: E. subrigida

Binomial name
- Echeveria subrigida (Robinson & Seaton) Rose

Synonyms
- Cotyledon subrigida Robinson & Seaton; Echeveria palmeri Rose; Echeveria rosei Nelson & Macbride; Echeveria angusta von Poellnitz

= Echeveria subrigida =

Species of succulent

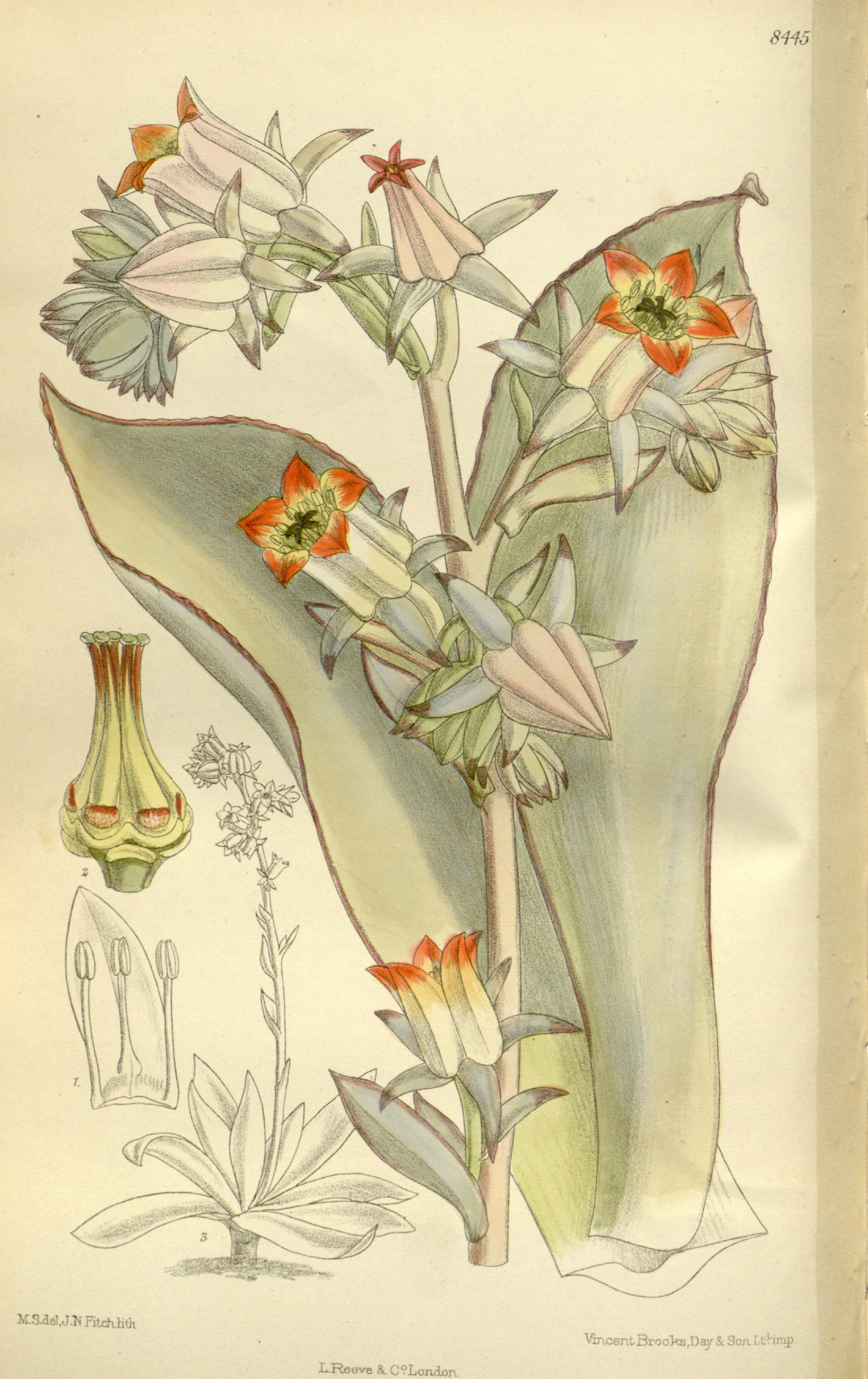
1912 illustration from Curtis's Botanical Magazine

Echeveria subrigida is a species of succulent plant native to Mexico. It was first formally described in 1903 by Benjamin Lincoln Robinson and Henry Eliason Seaton. Its basionym is Cotyledon subrigida.

== Etymology ==
Echeveria is named for Atanasio Echeverría y Godoy, a botanical illustrator who contributed to Flora Mexicana.

Subrigida means 'slightly stiff'.
