= Vallejera de Riofrío =

- Municipality
- Location in Salamanca

- Location in Spain
- Coordinates: 40°24′33″N 5°43′17″W
- Country: Spain
- Autonomous community: Castile and León
- Province: Salamanca
- Comarca: Sierra de Béjar

Government
  - Mayor: Pilar Martín Hernández

Area
  - Total: 7 km^{2} (2.7 sq mi)
- Elevation: 11,487 m (37,687 ft)

Population (2025-01-01)
  - Total: 67
  - Density: 9.6/km^{2} (25/sq mi)
- Time zone: UTC+1 (CET)
  - Summer (DST): UTC+2 (CEST)
- Postal code: 37717

Vallejera de Riofrío is a municipality located in the province of Salamanca, Castile and León, Spain. As of 2016 the municipality has a population of 67 inhabitants.
