= Sierra de Béjar (comarca) =

- Comarca
- Location in Salamanca
- Country: Spain
- Autonomous community: Castile and León
- Province: Salamanca

Area
  - Total: 614.1 km^{2} (237.1 sq mi)

Population (2010)
  - Total: 18,382
  - Density: 29.93/km^{2} (77.53/sq mi)
- Time zone: UTC+1 (CET)
  - Summer (DST): UTC+2 (CEST)

Sierra de Béjar is a comarca in the province of Salamanca, Castile and León. It contains the following municipalities:

- Aldeacipreste
- Béjar
- Candelario
- Cantagallo
- El Cerro
- Colmenar de Montemayor
- Cristóbal de la Sierra
- Fresnedoso
- Fuentes de Béjar
- Horcajo de Montemayor
- La Cabeza de Béjar
- La Calzada de Béjar
- La Hoya
- Lagunilla
- Ledrada
- Montemayor del Río
- Nava de Béjar
- Navacarros
- Navalmoral de Béjar
- Peñacaballera
- Peromingo
- Puebla de San Medel
- Puerto de Béjar
- Sanchotello
- Santibáñez de Béjar
- Sorihuela
- Valdefuentes de Sangusín
- Valdehijaderos
- Valdelacasa
- Valdelageve
- Vallejera de Riofrío
- Valverde de Valdelacasa
