= Valdehijaderos =

- Municipality
- Location in Salamanca

- Location in Spain
- Coordinates: 40°26′26″N 5°49′47″W
- Country: Spain
- Autonomous community: Castile and León
- Province: Salamanca
- Comarca: Sierra de Béjar

Government
  - Mayor: Hilario Ceballos (People's Party)

Area
  - Total: 11.75 km^{2} (4.54 sq mi)
- Elevation: 778 m (2,552 ft)

Population (2025-01-01)
  - Total: 84
  - Density: 7.1/km^{2} (19/sq mi)
- Time zone: UTC+1 (CET)
  - Summer (DST): UTC+2 (CEST)
- Postal code: 37713

Valdehijaderos is a municipality located in the province of Salamanca, Castile and León, Spain. As of 2016 the municipality has a population of 83 inhabitants.
