= Valverde de Valdelacasa =

- Municipality
- Location in Salamanca

- Location in Spain
- Coordinates: 40°28′53″N 5°46′54″W
- Country: Spain
- Autonomous community: Castile and León
- Province: Salamanca
- Comarca: Sierra de Béjar

Government
  - Mayor: Maria Cruz Blanco Herrero (People's Party)

Area
  - Total: 8 km^{2} (3.1 sq mi)
- Elevation: 803 m (2,635 ft)

Population (2025-01-01)
  - Total: 57
  - Density: 7.1/km^{2} (18/sq mi)
- Time zone: UTC+1 (CET)
  - Summer (DST): UTC+2 (CEST)
- Postal code: 37791

Valverde de Valdelacasa is a village and municipality in the province of Salamanca, western Spain, part of the autonomous community of Castile-Leon. It is located 63 kilometres from the provincial capital city of Salamanca and has a population of 76 people.

== Geography ==
The municipality covers an area of 8 km². It lies 803 metres above sea level and the postal code is 37791.

== See also ==
- List of municipalities in Salamanca
