= La Calzada de Béjar =

- Municipality
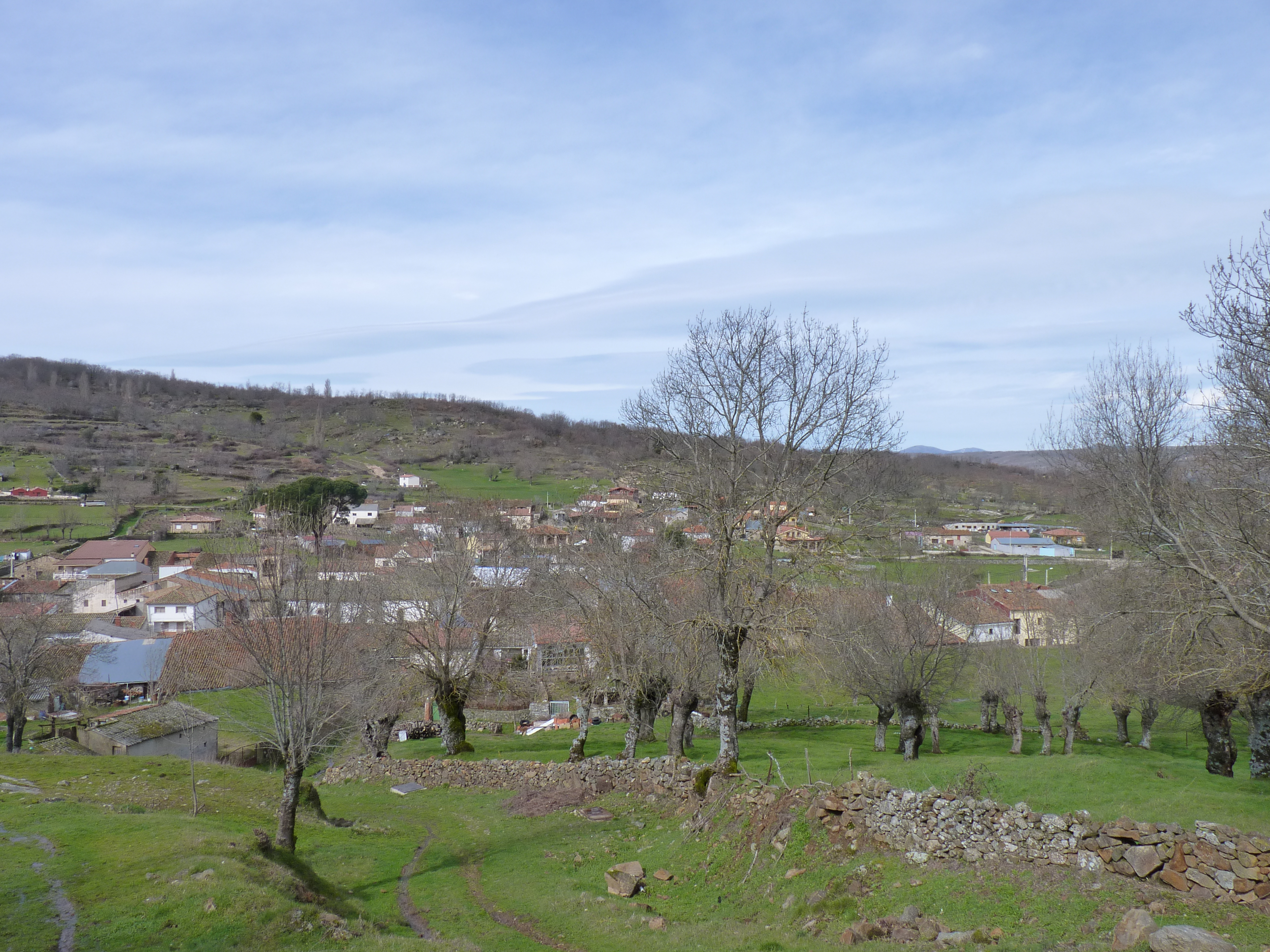

- Location in Salamanca

- Location in Spain
- Coordinates: 40°24′42″N 5°49′02″W
- Country: Spain
- Autonomous community: Castile and León
- Province: Salamanca
- Comarca: Sierra de Béjar

Government
  - Mayor: Pio Sánchez Martín (PSOE)

Area
  - Total: 9 km^{2} (3.5 sq mi)
- Elevation: 706 m (2,316 ft)

Population (2025-01-01)
  - Total: 80
  - Density: 8.9/km^{2} (23/sq mi)
- Time zone: UTC+1 (CET)
  - Summer (DST): UTC+2 (CEST)
- Postal code: 37714

La Calzada de Béjar is a village and municipality in the province of Salamanca, western Spain, part of the autonomous community of Castile and León. It is located 90 kilometres (56 mi) from the provincial capital city of Salamanca and has a population of 86 people.

== Geography ==
The municipality covers an area of 9 km^{2} (3.5 sq mi). It lies 796 metres (2,612 ft) above sea level and the postal code is 37714.

== See also ==
- List of municipalities in Salamanca
