= Valdelacasa =

- Municipality
- Coat of arms

- Location in Salamanca

- Location in Spain
- Coordinates: 40°30′21″N 5°45′47″W
- Country: Spain
- Autonomous community: Castile and León
- Province: Salamanca
- Comarca: Sierra de Béjar

Government
  - Mayor: Juan Ramos (PSOE)

Area
  - Total: 8 km^{2} (3.1 sq mi)
- Elevation: 959 m (3,146 ft)

Population (2025-01-01)
  - Total: 187
  - Density: 23/km^{2} (61/sq mi)
- Time zone: UTC+1 (CET)
  - Summer (DST): UTC+2 (CEST)
- Postal code: 37791

Valdelacasa is a municipality located in the province of Salamanca, Castile and León, Spain. As of 2016 the municipality had a population of 242 inhabitants. The population went down to 191 at the 2024 census.

== See also ==
- Los Santos mine
