= Juan Diego del Castillo =

Spanish pharmacist and botanist (1744-1793)

Juan Diego del Castillo (1744–1793) was a Spanish pharmacist and botanist who joined Vicente Cervantes in Mexico. Castillo wrote Plantas descritas en el viaje de Acapulco. He died in Mexico. Castillo had been a contemporary of Martín Sessé y Lacasta. In New Spain, Lacasta had been joined by a group of Spanish botanists selected by Casimiro Gómez Ortega, director of the Royal Botanical Garden of Madrid. These included Cervantes, José Longinos Martínez, and Del Castillo.

Del Castillo left a large sum of money towards the printing of their projected book Flora Mexicana. Cervantes named the genus Castilla after him.
