= Puerto de Béjar =

- Municipality
- Flag Coat of arms

- Location in Salamanca

- Location in Spain
- Coordinates: 40°21′05″N 5°50′15″W
- Country: Spain
- Autonomous community: Castile and León
- Province: Salamanca
- Comarca: Sierra de Béjar

Government
  - Mayor: José Luis Martín (People's Party)

Area
  - Total: 10 km^{2} (3.9 sq mi)
- Elevation: 950 m (3,120 ft)

Population (2025-01-01)
  - Total: 342
  - Density: 34/km^{2} (89/sq mi)
- Time zone: UTC+1 (CET)
  - Summer (DST): UTC+2 (CEST)
- Postal code: 37720

Puerto de Béjar is a municipality located in the province of Salamanca, Castile and León, Spain. As of 2016 the municipality has a population of 380 inhabitants.
