= El Cerro =

- Municipality
- Coat of arms

- Location in Salamanca

- Location in Spain
- Coordinates: 40°19′40″N 5°54′58″W
- Country: Spain
- Autonomous community: Castile and León
- Province: Salamanca
- Comarca: Sierra de Béjar

Government
  - Mayor: Juan Carlos Garavís González (PSOE)

Area
  - Total: 25.86 km^{2} (9.98 sq mi)
- Elevation: 955 m (3,133 ft)

Population (2025-01-01)
  - Total: 363
  - Density: 14.0/km^{2} (36.4/sq mi)
- Time zone: UTC+1 (CET)
  - Summer (DST): UTC+2 (CEST)
- Postal code: 37726

El Cerro is a village and municipality in the province of Salamanca, western Spain, part of the autonomous community of Castile-Leon. It is located 89 kilometres (55 mi) from the provincial capital city of Salamanca and has a population of 529 people.

== Geography ==
The municipality covers an area of 25.86 km^{2} (9.98 sq mi).

It lies 955 metres (3,133 ft) above sea level.

The postal code is 37726.

== Economy ==
- The basis of the economy is agriculture.

== See also ==
- List of municipalities in Salamanca
