= Fuentes de Béjar =

- Municipality

- Location in Spain
- Coordinates: 40°30′00″N 5°40′59″W
- Country: Spain
- Community: Castile and León
- Province: Salamanca
- Comarca: Sierra de Béjar

Government
  - Mayor: Manuel Sánchez (People's Party)

Area
  - Total: 14 km^{2} (5.4 sq mi)
- Elevation: 908 m (2,979 ft)

Population (2025-01-01)
  - Total: 239
  - Density: 17/km^{2} (44/sq mi)
- Demonym: fuenterrico -a
- Time zone: UTC+1 (CET)
  - Summer (DST): UTC+2 (CEST)
- Postal code: 37790

Fuentes de Béjar is a municipality located in the province of Salamanca, Castile and León, Spain.

== See also ==
- List of municipalities in Salamanca
