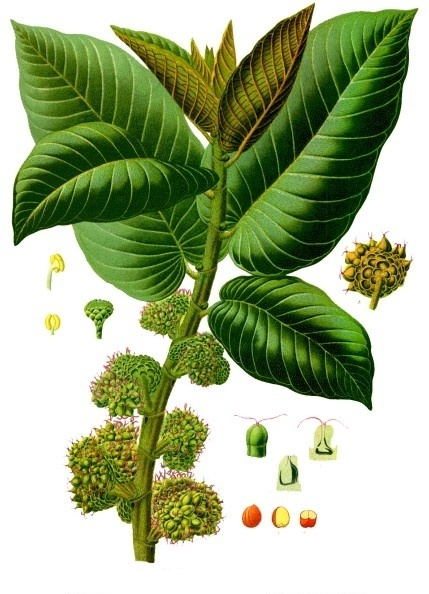
- Castilla elastica

Scientific classification
- Kingdom: Plantae
- Clade: Tracheophytes
- Clade: Angiosperms
- Clade: Eudicots
- Clade: Rosids
- Order: Rosales
- Family: Moraceae
- Tribe: Castilleae
- Genus: Castilla; Cerv. (1794)

Species
- 3; see text

Synonyms
- Castilloa Endl. (1837), orth. var.

= Castilla (plant) =

Genus of flowering plants

Castilla (sometimes incorrectly spelled Castilloa) is a genus of three species of large trees in the family Moraceae, native to Central and South America.

== Etymology ==
This genus is named after Juan Diego del Castillo (d. 1793), a Spanish botanist who was a friend of Vicente Cervantes, who chose the name in his friend's honor.

== Description ==
Castilla species are monoecious or dioecious trees up to 40 meters tall, with buttressed trunks and abundant white latex of commercial value. The branchlets have scars left by the fallen stipules. The leaves are oblong to elliptic, with entire margins. The inflorescences are surrounded by bracts and have small flowers. The male flowers are borne in lengthwise-folded kidney-shaped inflorescences and female flowers in globose inflorescences. The infrutescence varies in shape and has orange or red fruits.

== Ecology ==
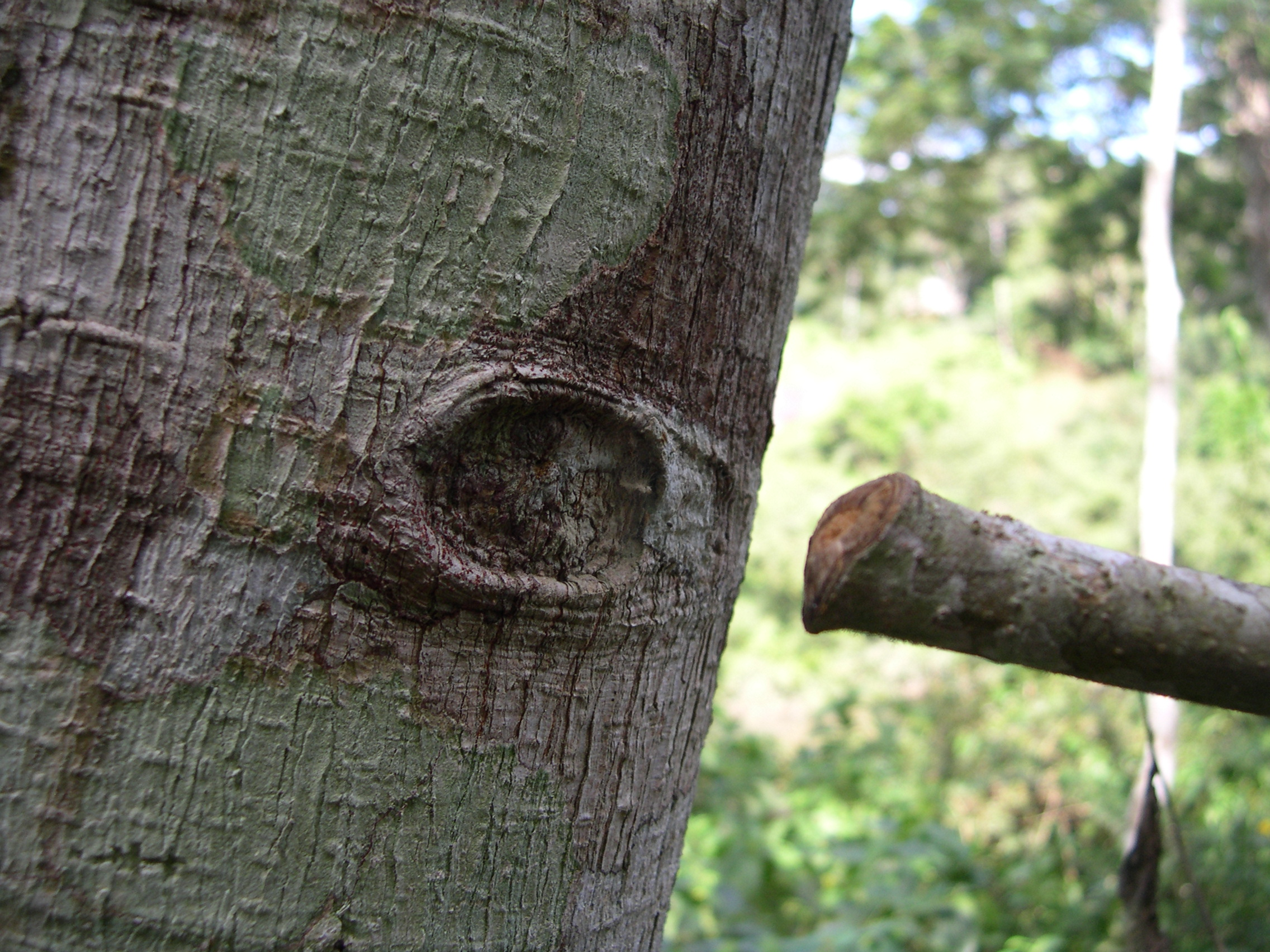
The Panama rubber tree Castilla elastica, showing the scar where a branch has dropped. A recently fallen branch is posed at right

Castilla species exhibit a phenomenon known as cladoptosis, the regular shedding of branches. This may be an adaptation to prevent the growth of climbing plants.

Castilla elastica is a weedy tree which has become invasive in areas where it has been introduced, such as in Tanzania and the South Pacific.

== Uses ==
The main species is Castilla elastica, one of several plants from which rubber has been extracted. The vernacular name is Panama rubber tree or castilloa rubber. The pre-Columbian MesoAmericans used the latex of this plant to make a ball used in a ceremonial game.

The Miskitu and Mayangna peoples of the Mosquito Coast, stretching from the Honduras to Nicaragua, traditionally made fabric from the bark of the Tunu rubber tree (Castilla tunu).

== Species ==
Image	Common name	Scientific name	Distribution
	Panama rubber tree, Castilloa rubber, palo de hule, olicuáhuitl	Castilla elastica Sessé	Mexico, Central America, and northern South America
		Castilla tunu Hemsl.	Ecuador, Colombia, Panama, Belize
	Caucho rubber, Caucho Negro	Castilla ulei Warb.	Brazil, Bolivia, Peru, Ecuador and Colombia

== See also ==
- Rubber
