= Cladoptosis =

Regular shedding of tree branches

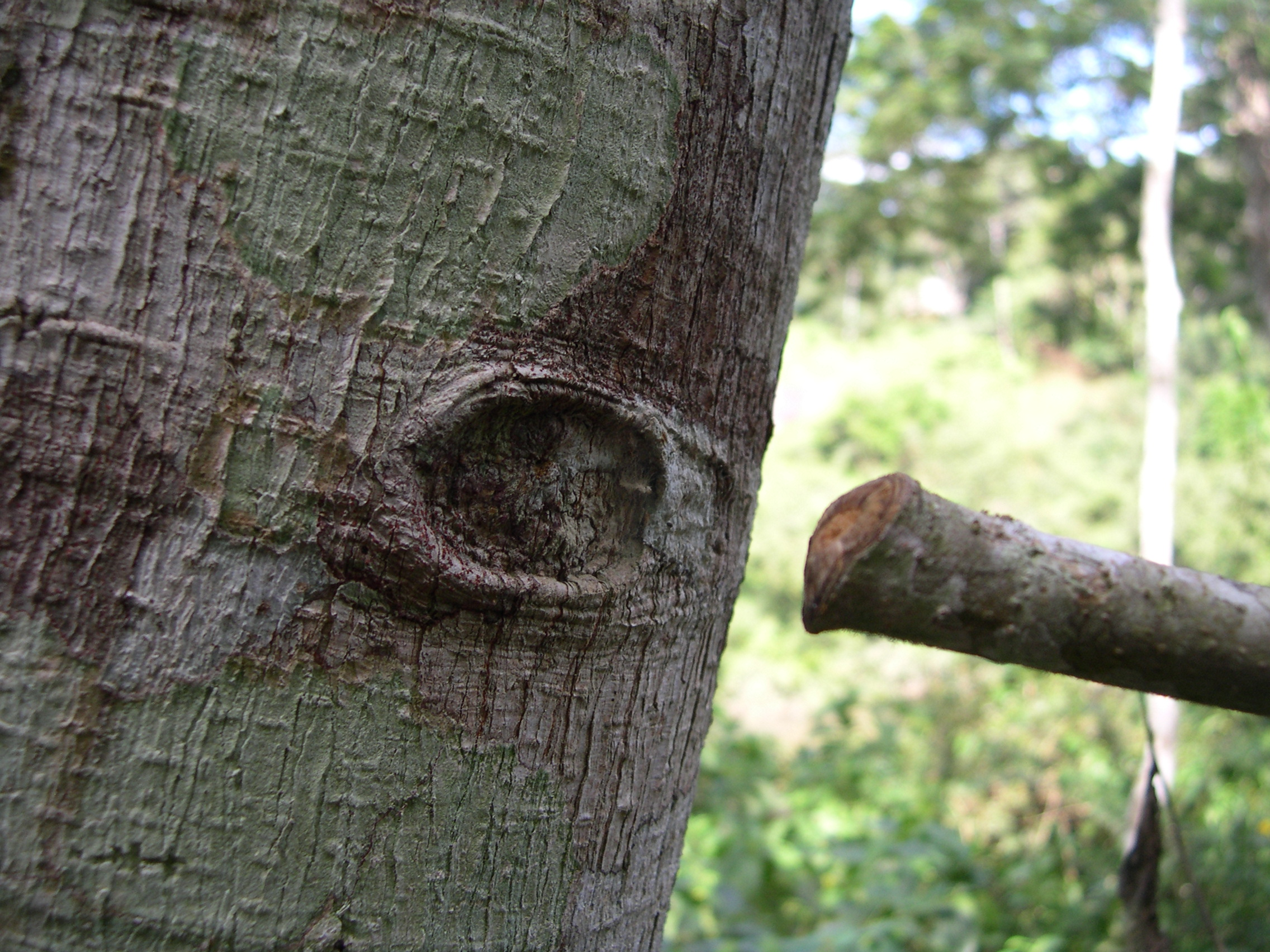
An abscission scar on the trunk of Castilla where a branch has been shed

Cladoptosis (Ancient Greek κλάδος kládos, meaning "branch", πτῶσις ptôsis, meaning "falling" [noun]; sometimes pronounced with the p silent) is the regular shedding of branches. It is the counterpart for branches of the familiar process of regular leaf shedding by deciduous trees. As in leaf shedding, an abscission layer forms, and the branch is shed cleanly. Also known as "self-pruning".

== Functions of cladoptosis ==
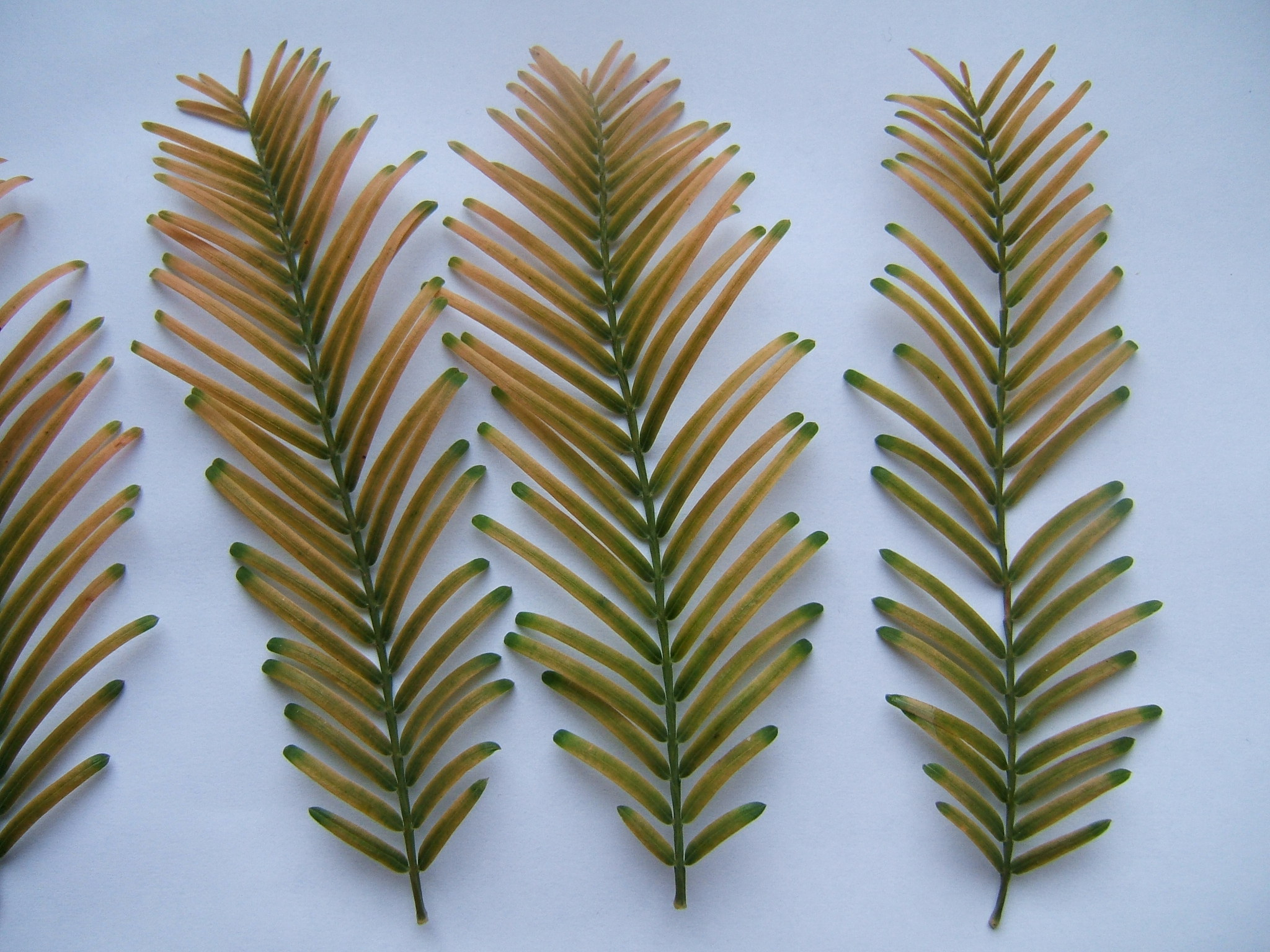
Autumn foliage fall in the deciduous conifer dawn redwood is by cladoptosis of whole shoots, not individual leaves.

Cladoptosis is thought to have four possible functions: self-pruning (i.e. programmed plant senescence), drought response (characteristic of xerophytes), liana defence, and in some plant families, normal leaf drop is by shedding small whole shoots, rather than individual leaves.

- Self-pruning is the shedding of branches that are shaded or diseased, which are potentially a drain on the resources of the tree.
- Drought response is similar to the leaf-fall response of drought-deciduous trees; however, leafy shoots are shed in place of leaves.
- In tropical forests, infestation of tree canopies by woody climbers or lianas can be a serious problem. Cladoptosis, by giving a clean bole with no support for climbing plants, may be an adaptation against lianas, as in the case of Castilla.
- In the conifer family Cupressaceae, most species shed old foliage by cladoptosis, rather than individual leaf drop. Dawn redwood (Metasequoia glyptostroboides) and western redcedar (Thuja plicata) provide examples; within the family, the only species that do not use cladoptosis for shedding old foliage are the junipers (Juniperus) in sections Juniperus sect. Caryocedrus and J. sect. Juniperus.

== See also ==
- Abscission
- Marcescence: the opposite phenomenon – withered branches (or leaves) stay on
