= Vicente Cervantes =

Spanish and Mexican physician and botanist

Vicente or Vincente de Cervantes (1755 in Ledrada – 1829 in Mexico) was a Spanish and Mexican medical doctor and botanist.

== Background ==
Don Vicente Cervantes was a contemporary of Martín Sessé y Lacasta and corresponded with Jean-Louis Berlandier, the French naturalist who botanized in Mexico and Texas as part of the Mexican Boundary Commission. He was also the first Professor of Botany in New Spain, at the Royal Botanic Garden in Mexico City.

It is after him that the magnificent Odontoglossum orchid from central and western Mexico, the "Cervantes Odontoglot" (Odontoglossum cervantesii), is named. This name was given in 1824 by Mexican botanists Pablo de La Llave and Juan José Martínez de Lexarza. Today this species´ accepted name is Rhynchostele cervantesii (La Llave & Lex.) Soto Arenas & Salazar, established in 1993 after several nomenclatural changes.

Juan Diego del Castillo (d. 1793) joined Cervantes in Mexico. Del Castillo left a large sum of money towards the printing of their projected book Flora Mexicana. Cervantes named the genus Castilla, consisting of three large latex yielding trees, after him.

== Publications ==
- Vicente de Cervantes, Castilla, in Gazeta de Literatura de México 1794, Suppl.: 7. (2 July 1794)
