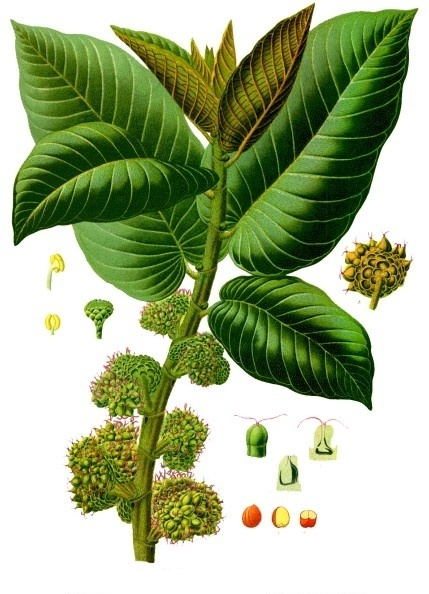

Conservation status
- Least Concern (IUCN 3.1)

Scientific classification
- Kingdom: Plantae
- Clade: Tracheophytes
- Clade: Angiosperms
- Clade: Eudicots
- Clade: Rosids
- Order: Rosales
- Family: Moraceae
- Genus: Castilla
- Species: C. elastica

Binomial name
- Castilla elastica Cerv.

Subspecies
- Castilla elastica subsp. costaricana (Liebm.) C.C.Berg; Castilla elastica subsp. elastica; Castilla elastica subsp. gummifera (Miq.) C.C.Berg

Synonyms
- synonyms of subsp. costaricana: Castilla costaricana Liebm.; Castilla daguensis Pittier; Castilla panamensis O.F.Cook; synonyms of subsp. elastica: Castilla elastica var. liga J.Poiss.; Castilla guatemalensis Pittier; Castilla gummifera (Bertol.) Standl.; Castilla lactiflua O.F.Cook; Castilla markhamiana Markham; Castilla nicoyensis O.F.Cook; Ficus gummifera Bertol.; synonyms of subsp. gummifera: Ficus gummifera (Miq.) Miq.; Urostigma gummiferum Miq.

= Castilla elastica =

Species of tree

Castilla elastica, the Panama rubber tree, is a tree native to the tropical areas of Mexico, Central America, and northern South America. It was the principal source of latex among the Mesoamerican peoples in pre-Columbian times. The latex gathered from Castilla elastica was converted into usable rubber by mixing the latex with the juice of the morning glory species Ipomoea alba which, conveniently, is typically found in the wild as a vine climbing Castilla elastica. The rubber produced by this method found several uses, including most notably, the manufacture of balls for the Mesoamerican ballgame ōllamaliztli.

The Nahuatl word for rubber was ulli / olli, from which their word for the ballgame derived), and also their name for the ancient people they associated with the origin of the ballgame, the Olmecs (olmeca: "rubber people"). The Nahuatl word for the tree of Castilla elastica is olicuáhuitl; in Spanish it is known as palo de hule.

== Subspecies ==
Three subspecies are accepted.

- Castilla elastica subsp. costaricana (Liebm.) C.C.Berg – Belize and Nicaragua to southwestern Colombia
- Castilla elastica subsp. elastica – Mexico to Costa Rica
- Castilla elastica subsp. gummifera (Miq.) C.C.Berg – Colombia and Ecuador

== Vernacular names ==
Caucho, castilloa rubber.

== See also ==
- Guayule - another source of latex utilized by the pre-Columbian Mesoamericans
- Para rubber tree - the main source of modern commercial natural latex
