= Aldeacipreste =

- municipality
- Flag Coat of arms

- Location in Salamanca

- Location in Spain
- Coordinates: 40°22′50″N 5°53′46″W
- Country: Spain
- Autonomous community: Castile and León
- Province: Salamanca
- Comarca: Sierra de Béjar

Government
  - Mayor: Juan Antonio García Rodríguez (People's Party)

Area
  - Total: 37 km^{2} (14 sq mi)
- Elevation: 869 m (2,851 ft)

Population (2025-01-01)
  - Total: 89
  - Density: 2.4/km^{2} (6.2/sq mi)
- Time zone: UTC+1 (CET)
  - Summer (DST): UTC+2 (CEST)
- Postal code: 37718

Aldeacipreste is a village and municipality in the province of Salamanca, western Spain, part of the autonomous community of Castile and León.
