= Colmenar de Montemayor =

- Municipality
- Location in Salamanca

- Location in Spain
- Coordinates: 40°23′58″N 5°57′34″W
- Country: Spain
- Autonomous community: Castile and León
- Province: Salamanca
- Comarca: Sierra de Béjar

Government
  - Mayor: Jaime Macia Viñals (People's Party)

Area
  - Total: 40 km^{2} (15 sq mi)
- Elevation: 830 m (2,720 ft)

Population (2025-01-01)
  - Total: 177
  - Density: 4.4/km^{2} (11/sq mi)
- Time zone: UTC+1 (CET)
  - Summer (DST): UTC+2 (CEST)
- Postal code: 37711

Colmenar de Montemayor is a municipality in the province of Salamanca, in the autonomous community of Castile and Leon, Spain. Its postal code is 37711.

== Geography ==
It is located 100 kilometres (62 mi) from the provincial capital city of Salamanca, at 830 metres (2,720 ft) above sea level. The municipality covers an area of 40 km^{2} (15 sq mi).

== History ==
It was founded by the king Alfonso IX of Leon in the 13th century.

== Demographics ==
It has a population of 189 people (2015).

== Monuments ==
- Church of Nuestra Señora de la Asunción.
- House of the nobleman.
- House of the Chantre.
- Hermitage of Nuestra Señora de la Consolación.
