= Valdefuentes de Sangusín =

- Municipality
- Coat of arms

- Location in Salamanca

- Location in Spain
- Coordinates: 40°27′55″N 5°49′47″W
- Country: Spain
- Autonomous community: Castile and León
- Province: Salamanca
- Comarca: Sierra de Béjar

Government
  - Mayor: Manuel Sánchez (People's Party)

Area
  - Total: 33 km^{2} (13 sq mi)
- Elevation: 890 m (2,920 ft)

Population (2025-01-01)
  - Total: 182
  - Density: 5.5/km^{2} (14/sq mi)
- Time zone: UTC+1 (CET)
  - Summer (DST): UTC+2 (CEST)
- Postal code: 37680

Valdefuentes de Sangusín is a municipality located in the province of Salamanca, Castile and León, Spain. As of 2016 it has a population of 229 people.
