= Valdelageve =

- Municipality
- Location in Salamanca

- Location in Spain
- Coordinates: 40°22′09″N 5°59′22″W
- Country: Spain
- Autonomous community: Castile and León
- Province: Salamanca
- Comarca: Sierra de Béjar

Government
  - Mayor: Crescencio Martín Matas (PSOE)

Area
  - Total: 16 km^{2} (6.2 sq mi)
- Elevation: 609 m (1,998 ft)

Population (2025-01-01)
  - Total: 66
  - Density: 4.1/km^{2} (11/sq mi)
- Time zone: UTC+1 (CET)
  - Summer (DST): UTC+2 (CEST)
- Postal code: 37725

Valdelageve is a municipality located in the province of Salamanca, Castile and León, Spain. As of 2016 the municipality has a population of 81 inhabitants.
