= Cantagallo, Spain =

Cantagallo
- Municipality
- Coat of arms

- Location in Salamanca

- Location in Spain
- Coordinates: 40°22′23″N 5°49′11″W
- Country: Spain
- Autonomous community: Castile and León
- Province: Salamanca
- Comarca: Sierra de Béjar

Government
  - Mayor: Adolfo Álvarez de Castro (People's Party)

Area
  - Total: 8 km^{2} (3.1 sq mi)
- Elevation: 932 m (3,058 ft)

Population (2025-01-01)
  - Total: 281
  - Density: 35/km^{2} (91/sq mi)
- Time zone: UTC+1 (CET)
  - Summer (DST): UTC+2 (CEST)
- Postal code: 37792

Cantagallo is a village and municipality in the province of Salamanca, western Spain, part of the autonomous community of Castile-Leon. It is located 90 kilometres (56 mi) from the city of Salamanca and as of 2016 has a population of 263 people. The municipality covers an area of 87.51 km^{2} (33.79 sq mi), and lies 932 metres (3,058 ft) above sea level. The postal code is 37792.
