= Cantagalo, Minas Gerais =

Cantagalo
- Municipality
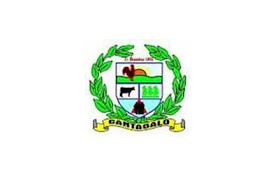
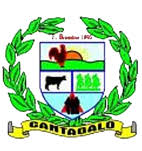
- Flag Coat of arms

- Location in Brazil
- Coordinates: 18°31′33″S 42°37′37″W
- Country: Brazil
- Region: Southeast
- State: Minas Gerais
- Mesoregion: Vale do Rio Doce

Population (2022 Census)
  - Total: 3,974
  - Estimate (2025): 4,029
- Time zone: UTC−3 (BRT)

Cantagalo is a municipality in the state of Minas Gerais in the Southeast region of Brazil.

== See also ==
- List of municipalities in Minas Gerais
