= Ledrada =

- Municipality
- Flag Coat of arms

- Location in Salamanca

- Location in Spain
- Coordinates: 40°28′N 5°43′W
- Country: Spain
- Autonomous community: Castile and León
- Province: Salamanca
- Comarca: Sierra de Béjar

Government
  - Mayor: Carlos Parra (People's Party)

Area
  - Total: 17 km^{2} (6.6 sq mi)
- Elevation: 880 m (2,890 ft)

Population (2025-01-01)
  - Total: 476
  - Density: 28/km^{2} (73/sq mi)
- Time zone: UTC+1 (CET)
  - Summer (DST): UTC+2 (CEST)
- Postal code: 37730
- Website: www.aytoledrada.com

Ledrada is a municipality located in the province of Salamanca, Castile and León, Spain. As of 2016 the municipality has a population of 577 inhabitants.
