= Atanasio Echeverría y Godoy =

Mexican botanical artist and naturalist

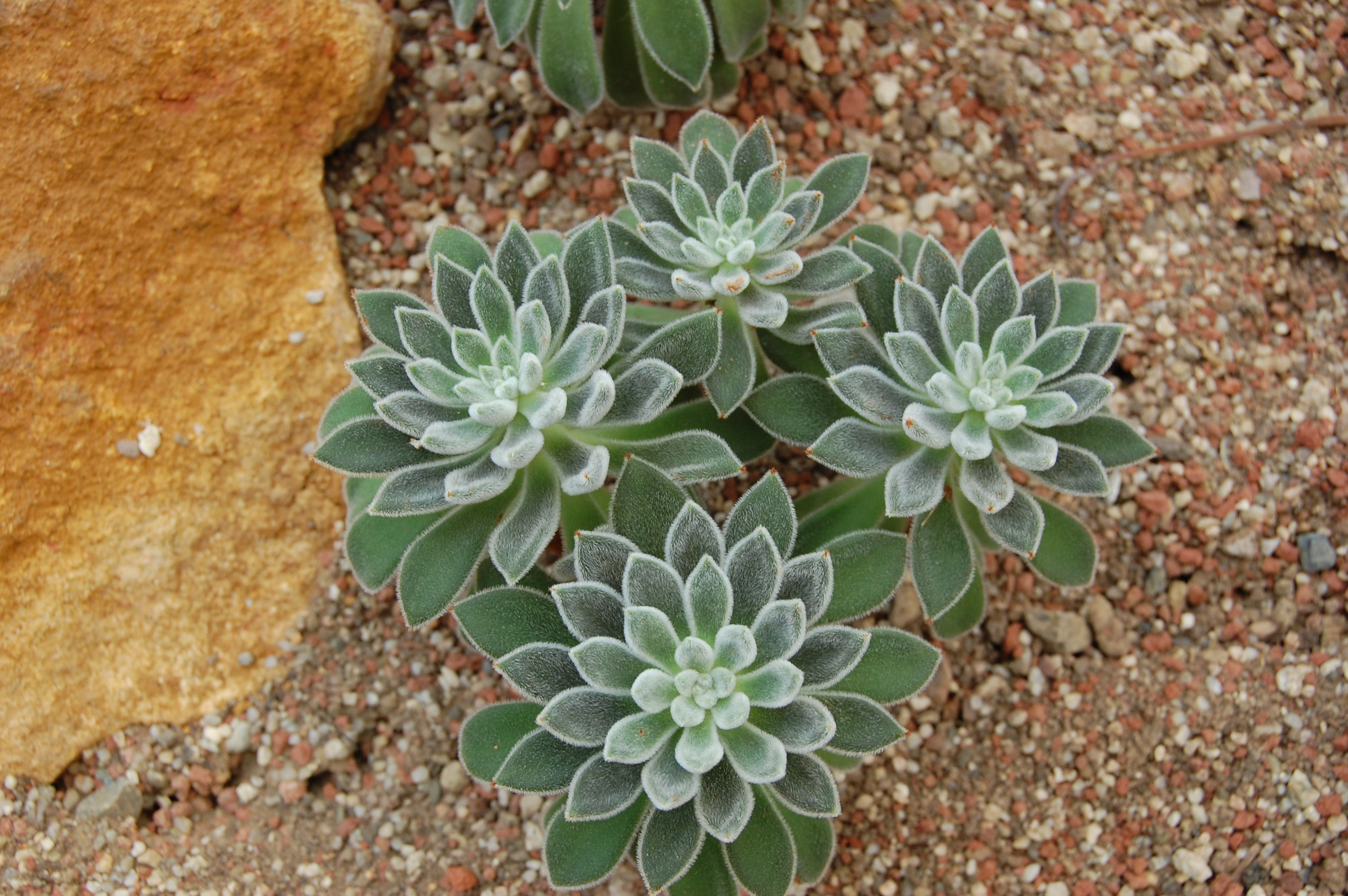
Echeveria leucotricha, a plant of the genus named after Echeverría

Atanasio Echeverría y Godoy was an 18th-century botanical artist and naturalist from New Spain who trained at the Royal Art Academy in Mexico City. The genus Echeveria was named in his honour by Augustin Pyramus de Candolle.

== Royal Botanical Expedition ==
=== 1787–1788 ===
On August 4, 1787, the academy appointed Echeverría and classmate Juan de Dios Vicente de la Cerda to accompany Director Martín Sessé y Lacasta on an expedition. Echeverría was hired to sketch the nature and botanical life and elements on the excursion. This expedition required both students to go across the country to study and sketch the botanical nature of the world. Echeverría had only been 16 when he had been appointed. This expedition would last from August 1787 to the year 1788. The artists moved from base to base, exploring the Valley of Mexico and the surrounding mountains.

=== 1789 ===
In 1788 when the excursion ended, Echeverría and Cerda broke off from the group with zoologist José Longinos Martínez. The men remained in Mexicalzingo making dissections and sketches while the rest of the group went back to Mexico City. This began the second excursion that Echeverría would be a part of in Guerrero, lasting from March to December 1789. During this trip, they collected about 372 new species and had created 180 paintings to go along with it.

=== 1790–1792 ===
In May 1790, Echeverría went on his third expedition to California. Both Echeverría and Cerda joined José Mariano Mociño for a while until 1792 when Cerda and leader Sesse decided to return to Mexico. During this expedition, the botanists became more selective of their work due to not finding any new species. The two assembled a collection along with over 100 paintings.

=== 1792–1795 ===
After his three major excursions, Echeverría had continued to travel to Nuka Island in the summer of 1792. He made about 200 sketches of the species, plants and animals he had found with only 20 sketches that were botanical. In his trip to Cuba in 1795, Sesse realized Echeverría was sick and couldn't finish his drawings from the trip.

== Data Process ==
=== Sketching ===
The process of collecting plant species starts by knowing when the plant is at its peak of blossoming. Since the artists are collecting these sketches for scientific study, their drawings have to be as accurate as possible. Freshly bloomed flowers meant that they were the perfect color and shape and the artists could get accurate date. Artists would sometimes pick the flowers and put them in a humid space to keep the flower alive long enough to finish any missing information.

=== Watercolor ===
The botanists began using watercolor to complete their sketches. This was the perfect medium to use because of its fast drying abilities, which allowed them to get the drawings done at a fast rate. Getting the color down correctly is also a big part in the drawings since it will be studied for scientific purposes.

== Guantanamo Commission and later life ==
Echeverría then joined the Guantanamo Commission under Conte de Mopox y Jaruco, which traveled across Cuba. On this expedition, 3,700 specimens were collected and 27 new species were described. Afterwards, Echeverría briefly traveled to Madrid before returning to Mexico and becoming an art director at the Academy of San Carlos.

== Artworks ==
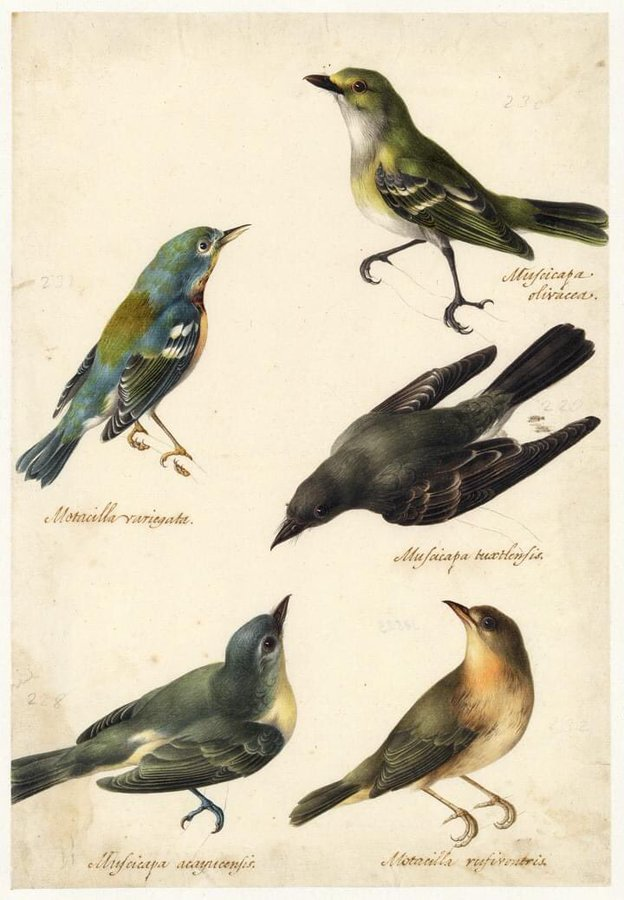
Ornithological Studies of Five Birds, Watercolor

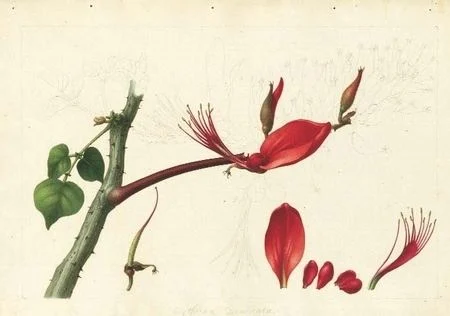
Erythrina Divaricata, Watercolour

== Collections ==
=== The Torner Collection of Sessé & Mociño Biological Illustrations ===
The Torner Collection of Sessé & Mociño Biological Illustrations is a collections of over 2,000 botanical and zoological illustrations made by Atanasio Echeverría y Gody, Juan de Dios Vicente de la Cerda, Jose Guio and Pedro Oliver.

== Honors ==
In 1828, Swiss botanist Augustin Pyramus de Candolle was fascinated by Echevería's drawings and gave him the honor of having a genus of flowering plants named after him that are native to the desert areas of Central America, Mexico, and northwestern South America. There are approximately 150 species of the Echeverría.

| Plant | Native Area | Sun Exposure |
|---|---|---|
| Perle Von Nurnberg | Central America | Full, Partial |
| Echeveria nodulosa | Central America | Full, Partial |
| Black Prince | Central America | Full, Partial |
| Topsy Turvy | Central America | Full, Partial |
| Dusty Rose | Central America | Full, Partial |

== Bibliography ==
- “Angiosperms (Flowering Plants)” Earth.com, 22 July 2021.
- “Botany and Horticulture Library” Smithsonian Libraries, 1 Jan. 1970.
- Echeverría y Godoy, Atanasio (Fl. 1771–1803) on JSTOR.
- “The Flora of El Camino” Camino Arts.
- Henry, Laura. “Atanasio Echeverria y Godoy” Wild Things, Wild Things, 10 July 2020.
- “Hunt Institute for Botanical Documentation” Torner | Hunt Institute for Botanical Documentation.
- Strano, Luigi. “Echeveria” Flickr, Yahoo!, 29 Jan. 2008.
- Warner-Admin. “Houseplant of the Week: Echeveria” Warner Companies, Inc., 21 June 2021.
- Bruquetas, Rocío. “The Search for the Perfect Color: Pigments, Tints, and Binders in the Scientific Expeditions to the Americas” The Journal of Interdisciplinary History, vol. 45, no. 3, 2015, pp. 367–87. JSTOR, JSTOR 43829639. Accessed 3 May
