= José Longinos Martínez =

Spanish naturalist (1756-1802)

José Longinos Martínez (15 March 1756 in Calahorra, La Rioja – 6 November 1802 in Campeche) was a Spanish naturalist whose account of his travels through Baja California Sur, Baja California, and California in 1792 provided an important early account of the region, its fauna, flora, minerals, and native inhabitants.

He was born in La Rioja, Spain. Coming to New Spain as part of a government-sponsored botanical expedition, he fell out with his superiors and struck off on his own. He traveled from Cabo San Lucas to Monterey between January and September 1792.

Although some sources state that Longinos performed cataract surgery in New Spain, available evidence indicates that he managed cataracts conservatively. However, he favored the procedure of cataract extraction over that of couching, and may have encouraged Narciso Esparragosa of Guatemala to begin performing cataract extractions.

Perhaps because of the rapidity of his journey, his account of the region was sometimes superficial, second-hand, or inaccurate. Nonetheless, it documented substantial otherwise-lost information, particularly on the lifeways of the native peoples.

Longinos travelled to Guatemala in 1795. He opened museums of natural history in Mexico City and in Guatemala.
