= C18H21NO6 =

The molecular formula C_{18}H_{21}NO_{6} (molar mass: 347.36 g/mol, exact mass: 347.1369 u) may refer to:

- Evoxine (haploperine)
- Naproxcinod (nitronaproxen)
