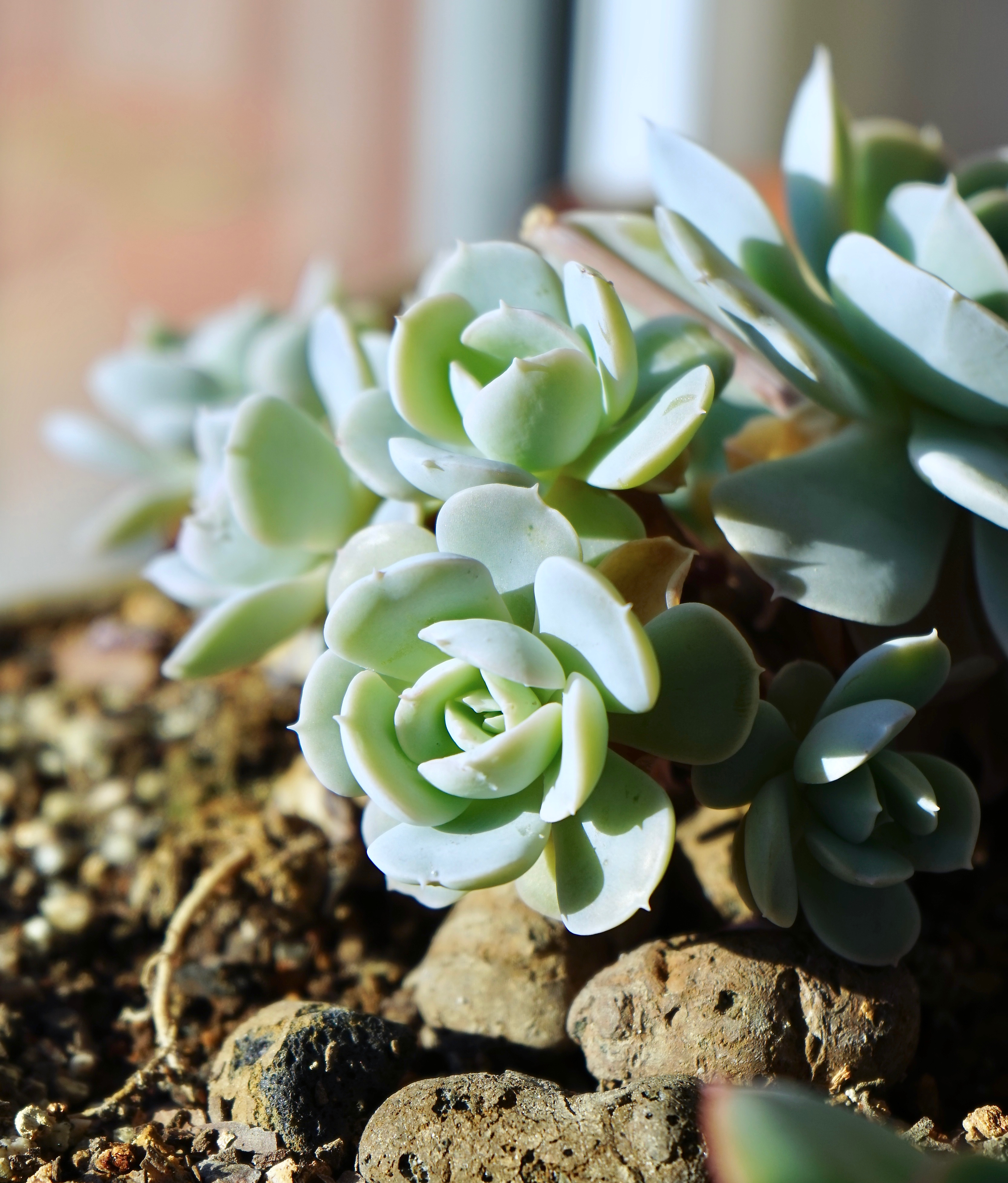

Scientific classification
- Kingdom: Plantae
- Clade: Tracheophytes
- Clade: Angiosperms
- Clade: Eudicots
- Order: Saxifragales
- Family: Crassulaceae
- Genus: Echeveria
- Species: E. runyonii

Binomial name
- Echeveria runyonii Rose ex E.Walther.

= Echeveria runyonii =

Species of succulent

Echeveria runyonii is a species of flowering plant in the family Crassulaceae, that is native to the state of Tamaulipas in Mexico. Several cultivars have been described and cultivated.

== Taxonomy and etymology ==
Joseph Nelson Rose described Echeveria runyonii in 1935, named in honour of Texas amateur botanist Robert Runyon. Runyon had collected the type specimen from a Matamoros, Tamaulipas garden in 1922. Wild populations were unknown until 1990, when one was discovered by the staff of Yucca Do Nursery.

The cytology of Echeveria species is helpful in identification, as many species can be very variable in appearance; E. runyonii has 14 chromosomes.

Echeveria is named for Atanasio Echeverría y Godoy, a botanical illustrator who contributed to Flora Mexicana.

== Description ==
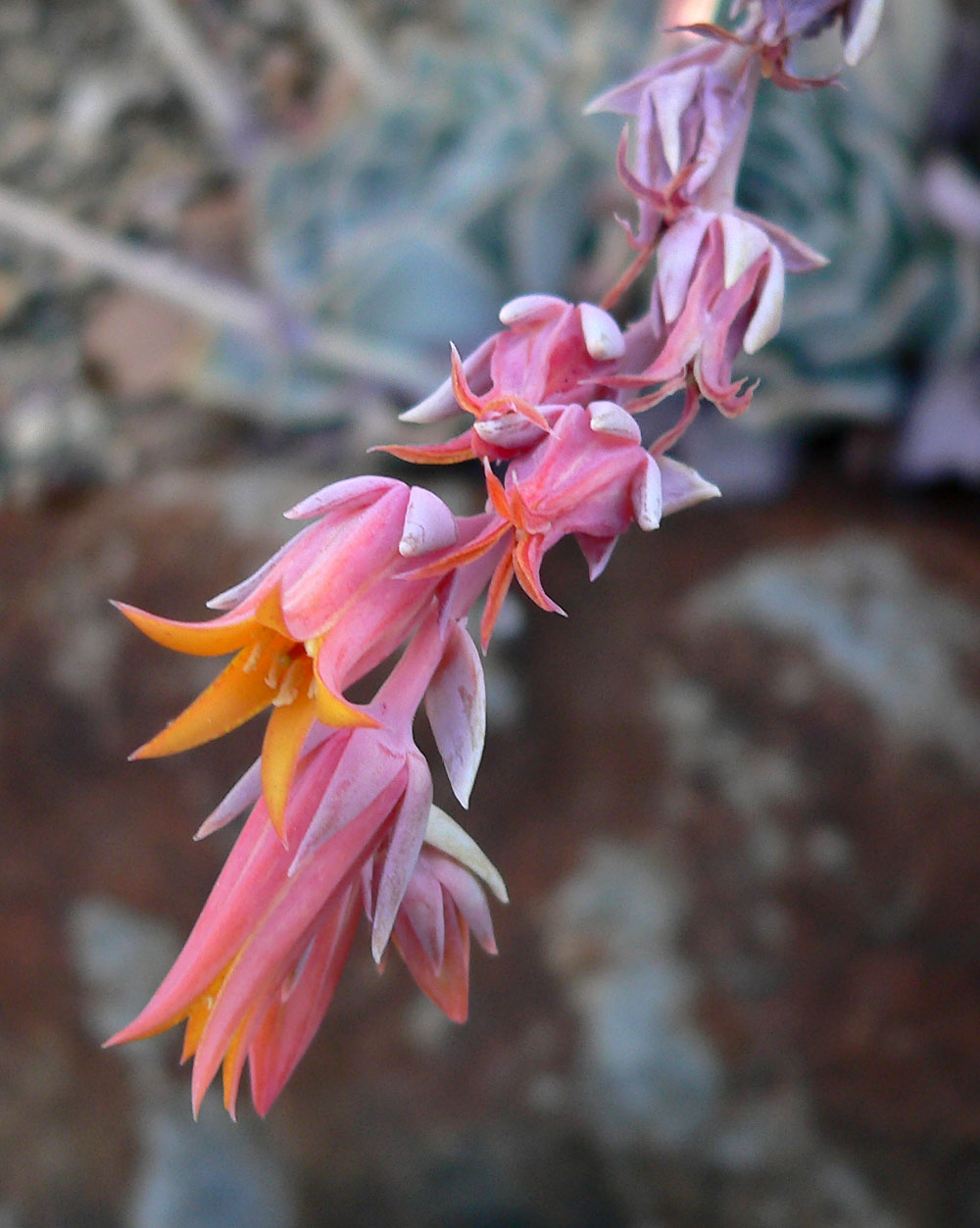
Inflorescence

Echeveria runyonii forms a rosette 8–10 cm (3.1–3.9 in) in diameter. Leaves are spatulate-cuneate to oblong-spatulate, truncate to acuminate, and mucronate. They are a glaucous pinkish-white in color and measure 6–8 by 2.5–4 cm (2.4–3.1 by 1.0–1.6 in). The single stem reaches 10 cm (3.9 in) in length or more and a diameter of roughly 1 cm (0.39 in). Inflorescences are 15–20 cm (5.9–7.9 in) tall and have 2 – 3 cincinni, conspicuous bracts, and pedicels approximately 4 mm long. The red flowers have ascending-spreading sepals to 11 mm and pentagonal corollas measuring 19 – 20 × 10 mm.

Echeveria desmetiana has similar-coloured glaucous leaves, but its leaves are wedge-shaped with mucronulate (pointed) tips.

== Cultivars ==
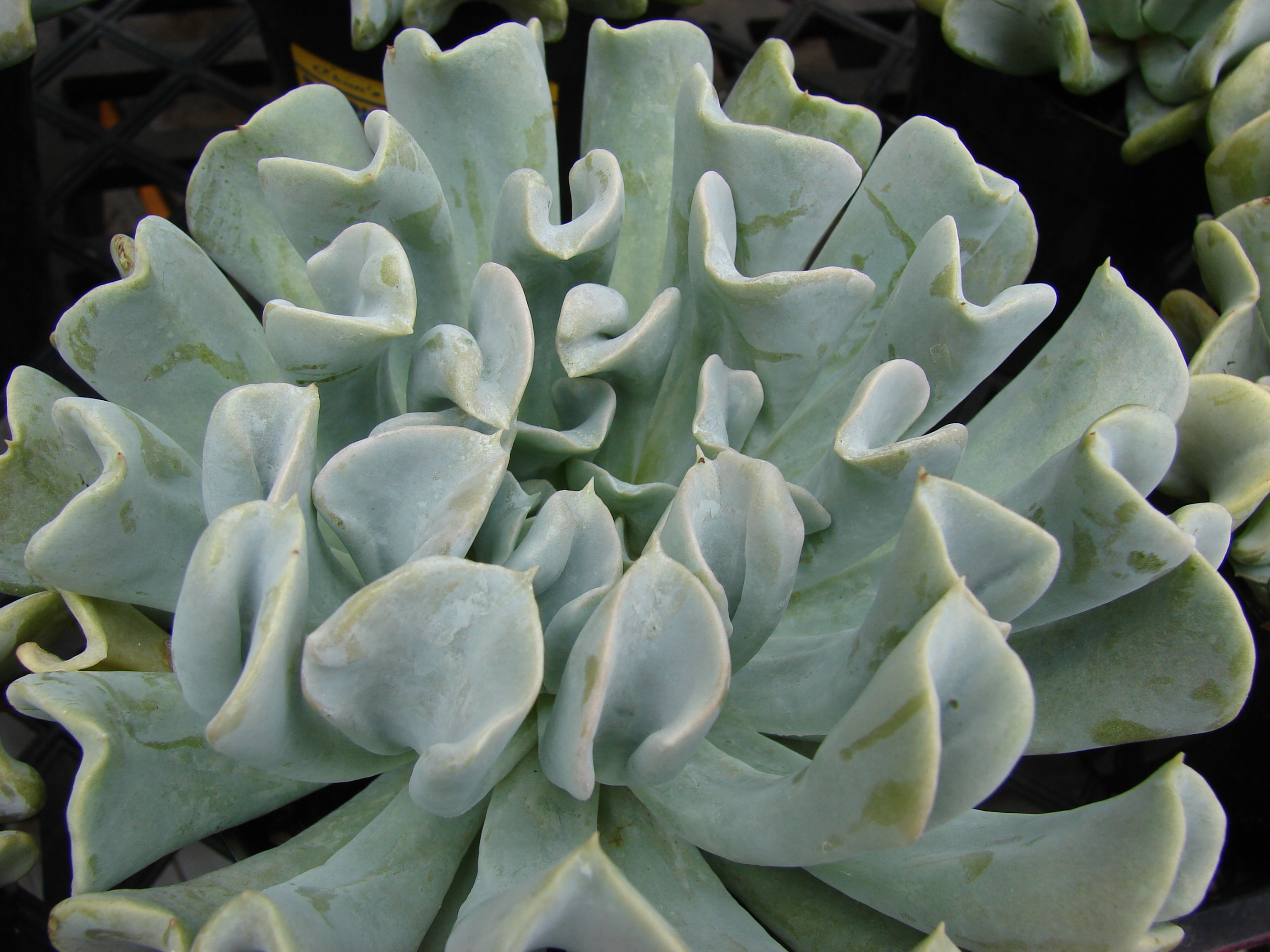
E. runyonii 'Topsy Turvy'

Several named cultivars exist, including 'Texas Rose', 'Dr. Butterfield', 'Lucita', 'Tom Allen', and 'Topsy Turvy'. The last is a mutant form originated in California, with leaves positioned upside-down.

== Hybrids ==
- Echeveria 'Domingo' (E. cante × E. runyonii)
- Echeveria 'Green Star' (E. harmsii × E. runyonii 'Topsy Turvy')
- Echeveria 'Swan Lake' (E. shaviana × E. runyonii 'Topsy Turvy')
- Echeveria 'Glade Surprise' (E. derenbergii × E. runyonii 'Topsy Turvy')
- Echeveria 'Dagda' (E. pulvinata 'Frosty' × E. runyonii 'Topsy Turvy')
- Echeveria 'Exotic' (E. laui × E. runyonii 'Topsy Turvy')
