= COX-inhibiting nitric oxide donator =

Class of nonsteroidal anti-inflammatory drugs

COX-inhibiting nitric oxide donators (CINODs), also known as NO-NSAIDs, are a new class of nonsteroidal anti-inflammatory drug (NSAID) developed with the intention of providing greater safety than existing NSAIDs.

These compounds were first described by John Wallace and colleagues. CINODs are compounds generated by the fusion of an existing NSAID with a nitric oxide (NO)-donating moiety by chemical means, usually by ester linkage. CINODs retain the anti-inflammatory efficacy of NSAIDs via inhibition of cyclooxygenase (COX) while arguably improving upon gastric and vascular safety, most likely via vasorelaxation, inhibition of leukocyte adhesion and inhibition of caspases, all known effects of NO.

The first CINODs were developed in the 1990s, and as yet none have been approved for use by the general public. The importance of developing such drugs was increased when COX-2-specific NSAIDs rofecoxib (Vioxx) and lumiracoxib (Prexige) were removed from major pharmaceutical markets in the mid-2000s due to vascular safety concerns. In addition, traditional NSAIDs increase blood pressure and interfere with the actions of antihypertensive drugs. Several CINODs are currently being tested in clinical trials, the most advanced of which are being conducted by the French pharmaceutical company NicOx, whose flagship compound naproxcinod (NO-naproxen, nitronaproxen) is in phase III trials for the treatment of osteoarthritis. Naproxcinod is a fusion of naproxen and a NO-donating group. Other CINODs are also being tested by NicOx for the treatment of diseases in which inflammation plays a role.
