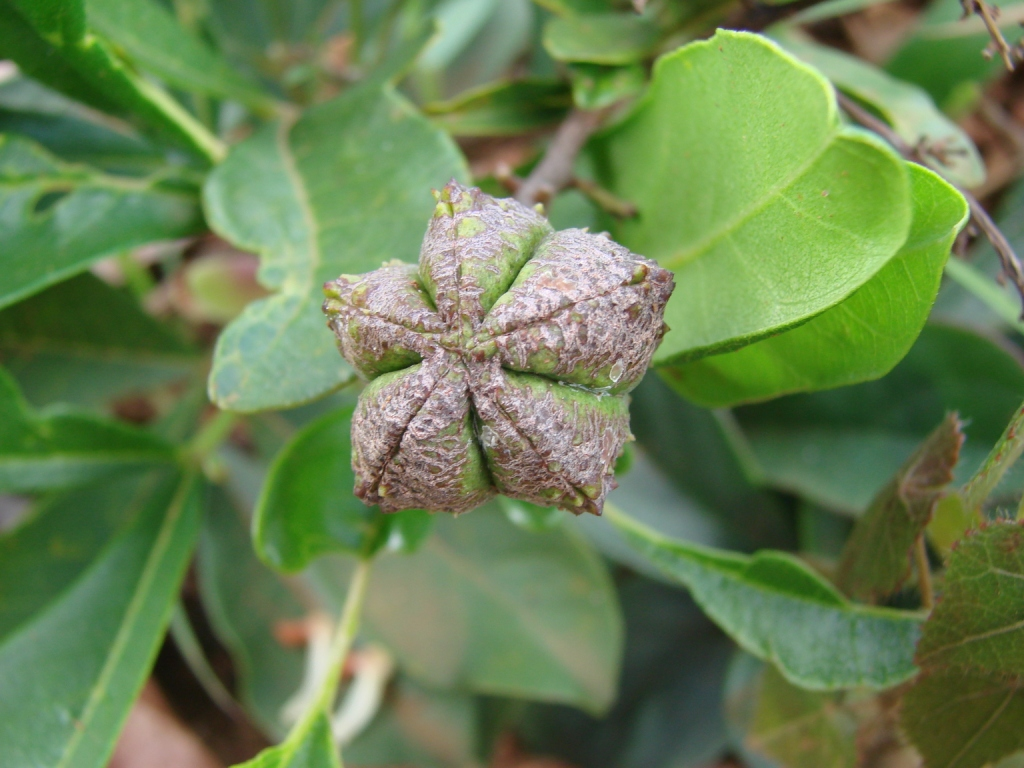
- Esenbeckia pumila

Scientific classification
- Kingdom: Plantae
- Clade: Tracheophytes
- Clade: Angiosperms
- Clade: Eudicots
- Clade: Rosids
- Order: Sapindales
- Family: Rutaceae
- Subfamily: Zanthoxyloideae
- Genus: Esenbeckia; Kunth

Type species
- Esenbeckia pilocarpoides Kunth

Species
- See text.

= Esenbeckia (plant) =

Genus of flowering plants

Esenbeckia is a genus of flowering plants in the rue family, Rutaceae. All species in the genus are native to the Americas, with the highest diversity in South America. They are commonly known as jopoy, the Mayan word for E. berlandieri, or gasparillo (Spanish).

== Taxonomy ==
The generic name commemorates German naturalist Christian Gottfried Daniel Nees von Esenbeck (1776 - 1858). The Takhtajan system placed the genus in the subfamily Rutoideae, while Germplasm Resources Information Network placed it in the subfamily Toddalioideae. A 2021 classification of the family Rutaceae places it in subfamily Zanthoxyloideae, a placement accepted by the Angiosperm Phylogeny Website.

== Selected species ==
- Esenbeckia alata (H.Karst. & Triana) Triana & Planch. — Winged Esenbeckia, Coya, Cuala-cuala (Colombia)
- Esenbeckia berlandieri Baill. ex Hemsl. — Berlandier Esenbeckia, Hueso de Tigre, Limonillo (Mexico, Central America)
- Esenbeckia flava Brandegee — Yellow Esenbeckia, Palo Amarillo, Palo Morio (Baja California Sur, Mexico)
- Esenbeckia grandiflora Mart.
- Esenbeckia hartmanii B.L.Rob. & Fernald — Hartman Esenbeckia, Crucecilla, Sámota (Sonora and Sinaloa, Mexico)
- Esenbeckia leiocarpa Engl. (Atlantic moist forests, Brazil)
- Esenbeckia pilocarpoides Kunth
- Esenbeckia pumila Pohl
- Esenbeckia runyonii C.V.Morton — Runyon's Esenbeckia, Limoncillo (Sierra Madre Oriental in northeastern Mexico, Rio Grande Valley of Texas in the United States)

=== Formerly placed here ===
- Balfourodendron riedelianum (Engl.) Engl. (as E. riedeliana Engl.)
