= Tom Scaperlanda =

American jeweller and historian

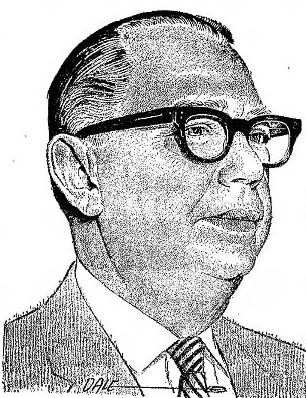
Tom Scaperlanda, 7 Nov 1963, Express and News

Thomas Munson Scaperlanda (December 16, 1895 – March 25, 1971) was a San Antonio jeweler and one of the foremost circus historians and collectors of circusana in the United States.

== Early life ==
Scaperlanda was born in Galveston, Texas, on December 16, 1895.

== Career ==
Tom Scaperlanda became a circus enthusiast in 1910. Scaperlanda and his brother Pasco Joseph Scaperlanda (1893–1941), together with Harry Hertzberg, were early members of the Circus Fans Association of which Scaperlanda later became president. The San Antonio chapter was named after Alfredo Codona, considered the world's greatest flying trapeze artist of all time, known for his daring triple somersault. He was a close friend of Scaperlanda and in 1932 gave him a detailed drawing of his trapeze rigging.

Scaperlanda was a part of the 36th Infantry Division, 131st Field artillery regiment and was sent to France in WW1. He was a veteran of World War I.

In 1969 Scaperlanda was one of four circus historians named to the National Awards Committee. The panel annually elects circus greats to the Circus Hall of Fame located in Sarasota, Florida.

He was the president of Bell Jewelers on Houston Street, San Antonio, and retired in 1961.

== Personal life ==
Tom Scaperlanda married Georgie Scaperlanda (1903–1994) and lived at 555 Donaldson Avenue, San Antonio.

He donated the elephant statue to Harry Hertzberg which became part of the Circus Collection donated to the City of San Antonio and now at the Witte Museum. Scaperlanda hired a San Antonio cast-stone worker, Julian Sandoval, to cast the elephant statue and it was originally placed in front of Hertzberg's house on Euclid Avenue. The statue was part of fives, and one of them was donated by his owner, Joaquin R. Abrego, to be placed near the Hertzberg's one.

It has been suggested that Scaperlanda and Hertzberg were longtime partners.

He died on March 25, 1971, and is buried at San Fernando Cemetery #2, San Antonio, Texas.

== Legacy ==
In 1976 The San Antonio Public Library opened the Scaperlanda Room at the Hertzberg Circus Collection. On display there were the Scaperland collection of photos, posters and circus novelties. The collection included a sterling silver-trimmed leather briefcase of early day western of movie star Tom Mix complete with the famous Mix brand. Another item is a Barnum and Bailey Circus press agent's scrapbook dated 1905–1906. Also about 35 circus route books from many famous oldtime tent circuses from 1881 to 1910.
