= Anna Goodman =

Anna Goodman may refer to:

- Anna Goodman (musician), songwriter known for collaborating with Ben Folds
- Anna Goodman (skier), Canadian Olympic skier
- Anna Goodman Hertzberg, American clubwoman
