= Cuala (disambiguation) =

Cuala is a Dublin GAA club in Dublin, Ireland.

Cuala may also refer to:

- Cuala Press, a former Irish private press
- Cualu or Cuala, a former territory in Ireland

== See also ==
- Cuala-cuala, a species of flowering plant
- Kuala, a town in Indonesia
- Kuala Lumpur, capital city of Malaysia
- Koala, a marsupial
- Coala, a video game
- Quala, a Colombian company
