= Senator Hertzberg =

Senator Hertzberg may refer to:

- Harry Hertzberg (1883–1940), Texas State Senate
- Robert Hertzberg (born 1954), California State Senate
