= Robert Runyon =

American politician

- Born: Robert Runyon; July 28, 1881; Boyd County, Kentucky
- Died: March 9, 1968 (aged 86); Brownsville, Texas
- Occupations: Photographer, botanist, politician
- Spouses: Nora Young (m. 1901–1908) Amelia Lenor Medrano (m. 1913–1968)
- Children: 6

Robert Runyon (July 28, 1881 – March 9, 1968) was an American photographer, botanist, and politician who served as the mayor of Brownsville, Texas from 1941 to 1943.

== Biography ==
=== Early life ===
Runyon was born on a farm near Catlettsburg, Kentucky, to Floyd and Elizabeth Runyon. He received a limited formal education and was largely self-taught. He married Nora Young in 1901 and worked as an insurance salesman in Ashland, Kentucky. Nora's death in 1908 led him to travel to New Orleans and Houston in search of employment. The Gulf Coast News and Hotel Company hired him to sell fruit, candy, sandwiches, and cigarettes to St. Louis, Brownsville and Mexico Railway passengers in early 1909. Several months later, he was promoted to manager of Gulf Coast's lunchroom and curio shop in the Brownsville train station.

=== Photography ===
Runyon opened a commercial photography studio in 1910. He initially photographed urban life Brownsville and Matamoros, Tamaulipas, and the surrounding terrain of the Rio Grande Valley. In 1913, Runyon began recording the events of the Mexican Revolution, starting with the takeover of the Matamoros garrison by the Constitutional Army under General Lucio Blanco on June 3. He traveled with Blanco's forces to Ciudad Victoria and later Monterrey. In 1915, Runyon was the only professional to photograph two skirmishes by Mexican bandits on American soil, the Norias Ranch Raid and a train derailment near Olmito, Texas. He took more than 2,000 pictures of Fort Brown, which captured troop buildup and mechanization in preparation for World War I. Runyon returned to more traditional subjects in the border region, as well as portraits and postcards, following the end of the war.

=== Merchant ===
He closed the studio in 1926 to become a partner in a Matamoros curio shop alongside his brother-in-law, José Medrano, whom he bought out three years later. He ran this store until 1938 and also operated a similar one in Brownsville.

=== Botany ===
Beginning in the late 1920s, Runyon became a successful amateur botanist, discovering several new species and accumulating a massive private herbarium. He wrote Texas Cacti: A Popular and Scientific Account of the Cacti Native of Texas with Ellen Schulz Quillin (1930) and Vernacular Names of Plants Indigenous to the Lower Rio Grande Valley (1947). A third book, An Annotated List of the Flora of the Lower Rio Grande Valley, went unpublished due to his death. Runyon was a charter member of the Cactus and Succulent Society of America and served as its regional vice president in 1942 and fellow in 1945. He was also involved in the Texas Academy of Science, the Botanical Society of America, the Torrey Botanical Club, the American Society of Plant Taxonomists, the International Association for Plant Taxonomy, and the Phi Sigma chapter at the University of Texas at Austin.

=== Politics ===
Runyon became active as a politician starting in the late 1930s and was appointed Brownsville city manager in 1937. On November 4, 1941, he was elected to a two-year term as mayor of the city. Runyon was appointed as the aide-de-camp of Kentucky Governor Earle C. Clements's staff in 1949 and received a commission as a colonel. He chaired the Cameron County Democratic Executive Committee from 1950 to 1952. Runyon unsuccessfully ran for the Texas House of Representatives in 1952. He served as a member and later chairman of the Brownsville Planning and Zoning Board between 1959 and 1961.

=== Later life ===
Runyon died at the age of 86 on March 9, 1968, and was buried in Buena Vista Cemetery.

== Personal life ==
Runyon married Nora Young on September 16, 1901, and had one son with her, William. His second wife, Amelia Lenor Medrano, was the daughter of a respected Matamoros family. They married on July 4, 1913, and had five children together between 1914 and 1926: Lillian, Amali, Virginia, Robert, and Delbert.

== Legacy and namesakes ==
Following his death, Runyon's herbarium was donated to the University of Texas at Austin, while Texas A&I University received his botanical library. In 1986, the Barker Texas History Center at UT Austin was given Runyon's photographic collection and business files by his family. The following plant species were named in his honour:

- Allium runyonii Ownbey
- Coryphantha macromeris var. runyonii (Britt. & Rose) L.Benson
- Cuscuta runyonii Yuncker
- Esenbeckia runyonii C.V.Morton
- Echeveria runyonii E.Walther
- Helianthus praecox ssp. runyonii (Heiser) Heiser
- Justicia runyonii Small
- Ruellia nudiflora var. runyonii (Tharp & F.A.Barkley) B.L.Turner
- Scutellaria drummondii var. runyonii B.L.Turner

== See also ==
- List of mayors of Brownsville, Texas
