= Naproxcinod =

Chemical compound

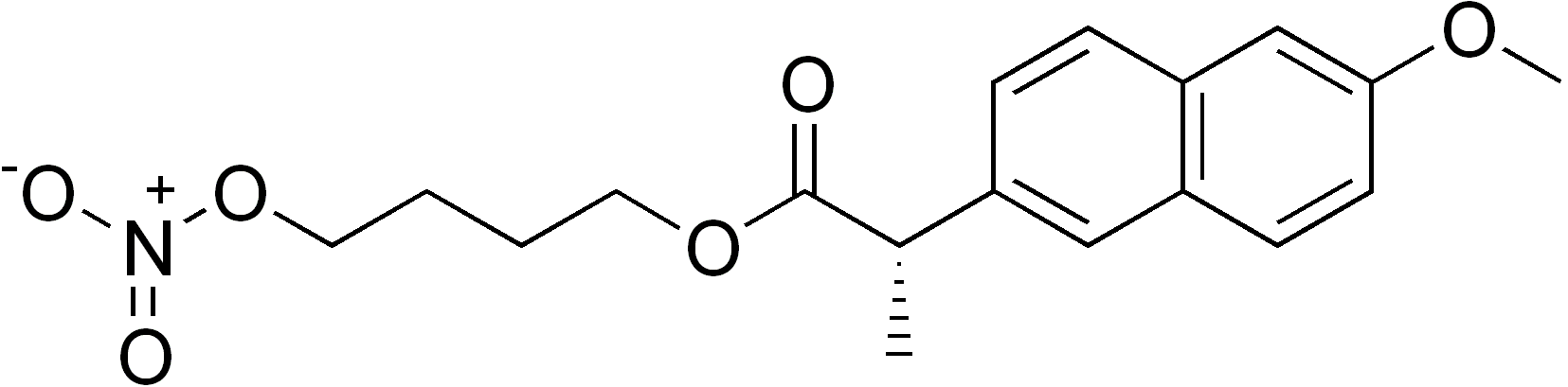

Clinical data
- Other names: AZD-3582, HCT-3012
- ATC code: M01AE18 (WHO)

Identifiers
- IUPAC name: 4-nitrooxybutyl (2S)-2-(6-methoxynaphthalen-2-yl)propanoate
- CAS Number: 163133-43-5
- PubChem CID: 9884642
- ChemSpider: 8060316
- UNII: V24GR4LI3I
- KEGG: D09568
- ChEBI: CHEBI:76254
- CompTox Dashboard (EPA): DTXSID20167523

Chemical and physical data
- Formula: C_{18}H_{21}NO_{6}
- Molar mass: 347.367 g·mol^{−1}
- 3D model (JSmol): Interactive image
- SMILES: C[C@@H](C1=CC2=C(C=C1)C=C(C=C2)OC)C(=O)OCCCCO[N+](=O)[O-]
- InChI: InChI=1S/C18H21NO6/c1-13(18(20)24-9-3-4-10-25-19(21)22)14-5-6-16-12-17(23-2)8-7-15(16)11-14/h5-8,11-13H,3-4,9-10H2,1-2H3/t13-/m0/s1; Key:AKFJWRDCWYYTIG-ZDUSSCGKSA-N

Naproxcinod (nitronaproxen) is a nonsteroidal anti-inflammatory drug (NSAID) developed by the French pharmaceutical company NicOx. It is a derivative of naproxen with a nitroxybutyl ester to allow it to also act as a nitric oxide (NO) donor. This second mechanism of action makes naproxcinod the first in a new class of drugs, the cyclooxygenase inhibiting nitric oxide donators (CINODs), that are hoped to produce similar analgesic efficacy to traditional NSAIDs, but with less gastrointestinal and cardiovascular side effects.

In December 2006, Scientific American distinguished naproxcinod as one of the ten most promising treatments for the world's biggest health threats. However, in 2010 the U.S. Food and Drug Administration determined that further clinical trials would be needed to obtain approval.

== Current situation in pain treatment ==
There are people who are currently relying on traditional NSAIDs and COX-2 inhibitors (for example celecoxib) to treat chronic pain and inflammation. COX-2 inhibitors have been associated with an increased risk of serious cardiovascular events such as strokes or heart attacks. Therefore, there is a need for safer medications. This need is particularly acute among patients with high cardiovascular risk like hypertension which represents 50% of osteoarthritis sufferers.

== Proposed indications ==
Three phase III clinical trials led by NicOx have shown that naproxcinod was effective to treat pain against knee osteoarthritis and hip osteoarthritis. A phase II study showed no significant differences in efficacy between naproxcinod and the COX-2 inhibitor rofecoxib in the treatment of pain.

In osteoarthritis, a 750 mg dose is equipotent to 500 mg of naproxen for the treatment of inflammation but with the added benefit of attenuating the cardiovascular effects traditionally associated with NSAIDs.

In July 2010 the FDA decided not to approve naproxcinod.

== Mechanism of action ==
Naproxcinoid is metabolized to naproxen and a nitric oxide donating moiety. NO has various cardiovascular effects, including vasodilatory and platelet-inhibitory actions as well as the inhibition of vascular smooth muscle proliferation that serves to maintain normal vascular tone.

== Safety profile ==
=== Blood pressure profile ===
According to some experts, cardiovascular risks induced by COX-2 inhibitors are caused by increases in blood pressure. Naproxcinod demonstrated in a clinical trial with 916 patients to have a blood pressure profile similar to placebo. Two phase II randomized controlled trials have shown a decreased systolic blood pressure by 2.1 mmHg after patients took naproxcinod (375 mg or 750 mg twice daily) for six weeks. These effects were especially pronounced in hypertensive populations.

==== Clinical relevance of small increase in blood pressure ====
During a U.S. Food and Drug Administration (FDA) COX-2 advisory committee meeting, doctors have underlined the important role of small increase in blood pressure. They cited the CAMELOT trial which has concluded that even a small decrease in systolic blood pressure of 5 mmHg could lead to a reduction of 31% in cardiovascular events. Clinical studies about rofecoxib have shown that this drug increases the systolic blood pressure.

A 2005 analysis shows that a blood pressure decrease of 3.1 mmHG could avoid over 30,000 deaths from stroke and 2,000 deaths from coronary disease, resulting in more than 449,000 person years of life saved and 1.4 billion US$ in direct health care cost savings.

=== Gastrointestinal safety ===
NSAIDs have also been associated with gastrointestinal risks such as bleedings. Early studies demonstrated that naproxcinod had a better gastrointestinal profile than naproxen, especially for the gastroduodenal mucosa, but a 2009 review has found only a slight and possibly not clinically relevant reduction of gastrointestinal side-effects.

== Commercialization ==
Naproxcinod completed a phase III study needed for a New Drug Application (NDA). As a result, Nicox submitted its project to the FDA in September 2009. In July 2010, the FDA decided not to approve naproxcinod without further clinical trials. Nicox submitted a Marketing Authorization Application (MAA) to the European Medicines Agency (EMEA) in December 2009. Nicox and Fera Pharmaceuticals announced in November 2015 that they had entered into a license agreement for the development and commercialization of naproxcinod in the United States.

== See also ==
- Nitrosoprodenafil – a dual PDE_{5} inhibitor / NO donor
