= Evoxine =

Names
- IUPAC name (±)-1-(4,8-Dimethoxyfuro[2,3-b]quinolin-7-yl)oxy-3-methylbutane-2,3-diol
- Other names Haploperine

Identifiers
CAS Number	522-11-2
3D model (JSmol)	Interactive image
ChEBI	CHEBI:4952
ChEMBL	ChEMBL1416006
ChemSpider	66130
KEGG	C10670
PubChem CID	73416
CompTox Dashboard (EPA)	DTXSID801028138
- InChI: InChI=1S/C18H21NO6/c1-18(2,21)13(20)9-25-12-6-5-10-14(16(12)23-4)19-17-11(7-8-24-17)15(10)22-3/h5-8,13,20-21H,9H2,1-4H3 Key: FGANMDNHTVJAHL-UHFFFAOYSA-N; InChI=1/C18H21NO6/c1-18(2,21)13(20)9-25-12-6-5-10-14(16(12)23-4)19-17-11(7-8-24-17)15(10)22-3/h5-8,13,20-21H,9H2,1-4H3 Key: FGANMDNHTVJAHL-UHFFFAOYAV
- SMILES: CC(C)(C(COC1=C(C2=C(C=C1)C(=C3C=COC3=N2)OC)OC)O)O

Properties
Chemical formula	C_{18}H_{21}NO_{6}
Molar mass	347.367 g·mol^{−1}

Pharmacology
ATC code	none
- Except where otherwise noted, data are given for materials in their standard state (at 25 °C [77 °F], 100 kPa). verify (what is ?) Infobox references

Evoxine (haploperine) is a furoquinoline alkaloid with hypnotic and sedative effects. It is found naturally in a variety of Australian and African plants including Evodia xanthoxyloides and Teclea gerrardii.
