= Ellen Schulz Quillin =

American botanist, author, educator and museum director (1892–1970)

- Born: June 16, 1887; Saginaw County, Michigan, US
- Died: May 6, 1970 (aged 82); San Antonio, Texas, US
- Education: M.S., University of Michigan, 1918
- Spouse: Roy Quillin
- Scientific career
- Fields: Botany
- Institutions: Witte Museum
- Author abbrev. (botany): E.D.Schulz

Ellen Dorothy Schulz Quillin (June 16, 1887 – May 6, 1970) was an American botanist, author, and museum director who helped establish the Witte Museum in San Antonio, Texas. She was the museum's director from 1926 to 1960. Quillin also wrote several field guides relating to plants in Texas.

== Early life and family ==
Ellen Dorothy Schulz was born on June 16, 1887, in Saginaw County, Michigan, the daughter of William and Anna (Millfeld) Schulz. She received an M.S. degree from the University of Michigan in 1918 and did postgraduate work at the University of Texas from 1920 to 1922. She married Roy W. Quillin, an employee of Mobil and amateur ornithologist and oologist, on July 29, 1927. The couple had no children.

== Career ==
Ellen Quillin taught in the San Antonio public school system from 1916 to 1933; from 1923 to 1933 she was director of nature study and science. She was an instructor in systematic botany for the University of Texas during the summer terms of 1921–1923, and a lecturer in natural history from 1927 to 1951.

In the 1920s, Quillin was instrumental in organizing the San Antonio Museum Association and raising funds to house the collection of natural history specimens of Henry Philemon Attwater. These efforts culminated in the opening of the Witte Museum on October 8, 1926, under the charter of the museum association. The Witte is devoted to natural history, the history of Texas, and the arts. Quillin was elected the first director of the Museum, a post which she held until May, 1960. On her retirement, she continued as director emeritus, until her death in 1970.

The 1930s brought the Great Depression and a challenging economic climate for the Witte and its patrons alike. As a fundraising initiative in response, Quillin built the Reptile Garden on museum grounds, using donated labor and materials. Live snakes, turtles, lizards, and alligators were to be displayed. This somewhat bizarre tourist attraction opened on June 8, 1933. Despite the gimmicky snake-handling demonstrations and turtle races, the Reptile Garden became a research facility for antivenom experimentation and it attracted international scholars. The Reptile Garden also bolstered the Witte's finances for ten years. On closure of the Reptile Garden, the collection of live snakes was donated to the San Antonio Zoo.

Quillin served as assistant director (1942–1950) and acting director (1950–1952) of the San Antonio Art Institute, an art school that operated from the 1920s to 1992.

Ellen Quillin published several scholarly books, articles, and popular works on local botany. The first of these was 500 Wild Flowers of San Antonio and Vicinity in 1922, with photographs by the author. Her most important work, Texas Wild Flowers: A Popular Account of the Common Wild Flowers of Texas, appeared in 1928. The book included folklore and history of the plants, their economic uses, and typical locations. With Robert Runyon, she produced Texas Cacti: A Popular and Scientific Account of the Cacti Native to Texas in 1931, and followed that up with several books on cactus horticulture. A series of nine children's books on nature and science appeared in the 1930s.

Quillin co-authored The Story of the Witte Memorial Museum, 1922-1960 in 1966.

== Later life and death ==
Ellen Quillin died on May 6, 1970, of an apparent heart attack, at her home in San Antonio. She was survived by her husband. William A. Burns was named her successor as director of the Witte.

== Recognition and legacy ==
Ellen Quillin was a charter member of the second Texas Academy of Science. She was named a fellow in 1929 and an honorary life fellow in 1949. She served as vice president of the organization in 1942.

On the occasion of her retirement from the Witte, the city of San Antonio designated October 30, 1960 as "Ellen Quillin Day." She was honored with a citation from Trinity University, a resolution from the mayor, and a reception at the museum. The life and work of Ellen Quillin, including the founding of the Witte, were dramatized in 1999 by the play, A Gallery of Ghosts, by Laura Dietrich.

== Selected publications ==
- Schulz, Ellen D. (1922). 500 Wild Flowers of San Antonio and Vicinity. San Antonio, TX.
- Quillin, Ellen S. (1928). Texas Wild Flowers: A Popular Account of the Common Wild Flowers of Texas. Chicago, IL: Laidlaw Bros.
- Quillin, Ellen S.; Runyon, Robert (1930). Texas Cacti: A Popular and Scientific Account of the Cacti Native of Texas. San Antonio, TX: Texas Academy of Science.
- Schulz, Ellen D. (1932). Cactus Culture. New York, NY: Orange Judd Publishing Co.
- Gable, Charles H.; Quillin, Ellen Schulz (1944). The Book of Little Creatures with Many Legs. Nature Science Books: Outdoor Adventures. Chicago, IL: Albert Whitman & Co.
- Woolford, Bess Carroll; Quillin, Ellen Schulz (1966). The Story of the Witte Memorial Museum, 1922-1960. San Antonio, TX: San Antonio Museum Association.

== Bibliography ==
- Bonta, Marcia Myers (1991). Women in the Field: America's Pioneering Women Naturalists. College Station, TX: Texas A&M University Press. ISBN 0-89096-489-0.
