= Furoquinoline alkaloid =

Group of chemical compounds

Chemical structure of dictamnine

Chemical structure of skimmianine (β-fagarine)

Furoquinoline alkaloids are a group of alkaloids with simple structure. Distribution of this group of alkaloids is essentially limited to plant family Rutaceae. The simplest member of this group is dictamnine and most widespread member is skimmianine.

A furoquinoline alkaloid, dictamnine, is very common within the family Rutaceae. It is the main alkaloid in the roots of Dictamnus albus and responsible for the mutagenicity of the drug derived from crude extracts. Dictamnine was also reported to be a phototoxic and photomutagenic compound. It participates in the severe skin phototoxicity of the plant. Another furoquinoline alkaloid, skimmianine, has strong antiacetylcholinesterase activity.

== Chemistry ==
Thomas first isolated dictamnine from Rutaceae in 1923. It is very weak base, shows similar reaction with methyl iodide and dimethyl sulfate or diazomethane, does not form a derivative but go through isomerization to isodictamnine. Dictamnine have linear structure which is confirmed as it forms dictamnic acid by oxidative degradation with potassium permanganate. Dieckmann cyclization followed by methylation and hydrolysis confirmed the structure of the acid. Skimmianine, another common furoquinoline alkaloid also shows a very similar type of chemistry to dictamnine. Skimmianine also has a linear structure as it gave 3-ethyl-4,7,8-trimethoxy-2-quinolone from hydrolysis.

== Pharmacological properties ==
Some furoquinoline alkaloids have been found to have in vitro pharmacological properties such as antimicrobial, antiviral, mutagenic and cytotoxic activities. They also show antiplatelet aggregation, inhibition of various enzymes, antibacterial, and antifungal activity. Dictamnine has the property of causing smooth muscle contraction. Skimmianine, extracted from Esenbeckia leiocarpa Engl. (Rutaceae), a native tree from Brazil popularly known as guarantã, show acetylcholinesterase inhibition. Furoquinoline alkaloids extracted from Teclea afzelii (Rutaceae) plants, collected at Elounden, centre province of Cameroon, have antiplasmodial activities. Another study shows that some furoquinoline alkaloids have in vitro activity against Plasmodium falciparum, one of the species of Plasmodium that causes malaria in humans. One furoquinoline alkaloid, 5-(1,1-dimethylallyl)-8-hydroxy-furo[2-3-b]quinolone, shows antifungal properties against Rhizoctonia solani, Sclerotium rolfsi, and Fusarium solani. These fungi cause root-rot and wilt diseases in potato, sugar beet and tomato.

== Spectral properties ==
For UV spectra an intense band is observed at 235 nm and very broad band in region 290-335 nm. Compared to UV, IR spectra shows less characteristics: 1090–1110 cm^{−1} region shows a band but don't indicate a particular vibration. NMR spectroscopy is the best way to observe the structure of furoquinoline alkaloids. C-2 proton gives response in 7.50-7.60 ppm region and C-3 proton gives response in 6.90-7.10 ppm region. Aromatic methoxy group give responses in 4.0-4.2 ppm region but 4-methoxy group give responses in ~4.40 ppm region.
