= Skimmianine =

Names
- Preferred IUPAC name 4,7,8-Trimethoxyfuro[2,3-b]quinoline
- Other names Skimmianin; β-Fagarine; Chloroxylonine

Identifiers
CAS Number	83-95-4
3D model (JSmol)	Interactive image
ChEBI	CHEBI:9172
ChEMBL	ChEMBL21396
ChemSpider	6502
EC Number	110-051-1
KEGG	C10740
PubChem CID	6760
UNII	4E1KLC380B
CompTox Dashboard (EPA)	DTXSID90232116
- InChI: InChI=1S/C14H13NO4/c1-16-10-5-4-8-11(13(10)18-3)15-14-9(6-7-19-14)12(8)17-2/h4-7H,1-3H3 Key: SLSIBLKBHNKZTB-UHFFFAOYSA-N
- SMILES: COC1=C(C2=C(C=C1)C(=C3C=COC3=N2)OC)OC

Properties
Chemical formula	C_{14}H_{13}NO_{4}
Molar mass	259.261 g·mol^{−1}
Melting point	177 °C (351 °F; 450 K)

Hazards
- GHS labelling
Pictograms	(GHS07: Exclamation mark)
Signal word	Warning
Hazard statements	H302, H315, H319
Precautionary statements	P264, P264+P265, P270, P280, P301+P317, P302+P352, P305+P351+P338, P321, P330, P332+P317, P337+P317, P362+P364, P501
- Except where otherwise noted, data are given for materials in their standard state (at 25 °C [77 °F], 100 kPa). Infobox references

Skimmianine is a furoquinoline alkaloid found in Skimmia japonica, a flowering plant in family Rutaceae that is native to Japan and China. It is a known acetylcholinesterase inhibitor.

== Biosynthesis ==
The biosynthesis of skimmianine starts from anthranilic acid, which is very abundant in the family Rutaceae. By combining anthranilic acid acetate, anthraniloyl-CoA is formed as a starting unit and able to extend side chain by adding malonyl-CoA by Claisen condensation. Next, lactam is formed through the cyclization and generate a heterocyclic system, leading the dienol tautomer adopt the 4-hydroxy quinolone tautomer, which is 4-hydroxy-2-quinolone.

With the formation of quinolone, alkylation is happening at C-3 position by introducing dimethylallyl diphosphate. Another key step is the cyclization on the dimethylallyl sidechain, forming a new heterocyclic five-member-ring. Platydesmine is then forming an intermediate through the oxidative cleavage reaction by losing an isopropyl group to form dictamine. Finally, skimmianine is formed through the hydroxylation of dictamine.

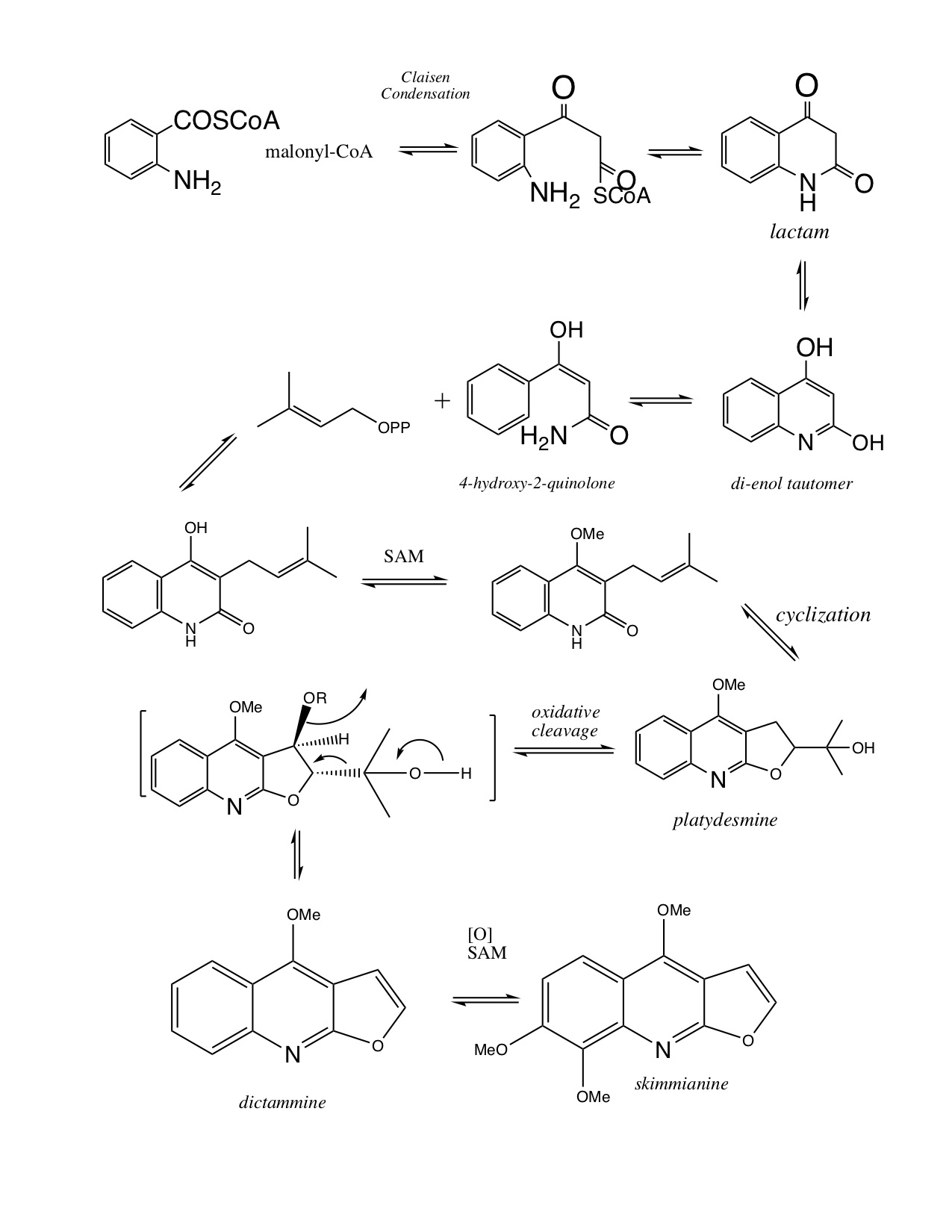
Biosynthesis of skimmianine
