= Esenbeckia runyonii =

Conservation status
- Vulnerable (IUCN 3.1)

Scientific classification
- Kingdom: Plantae
- Clade: Embryophytes
- Clade: Tracheophytes
- Clade: Angiosperms
- Clade: Eudicots
- Clade: Rosids
- Order: Sapindales
- Family: Rutaceae
- Genus: Esenbeckia
- Species: E. runyonii

Binomial name
- Esenbeckia runyonii C.V.Morton

Species of tree

Esenbeckia runyonii is a species of flowering tree in the citrus family, Rutaceae, that is native to northeastern Mexico, with a small, disjunct population in the Lower Rio Grande Valley of Texas in the United States. Common names include Limoncillo and Runyon's Esenbeckia. The specific epithet honors Robert Runyon, a botanist and photographer from Brownsville, Texas, who collected the type specimen from a stand of four trees discovered by Harvey Stiles on the banks of Resaca del Rancho Viejo, Texas, in 1929. Conrad Vernon Morton of the Smithsonian Institution received the plant material and formally described the species in 1930. Some consider it a synonym of E. berlandieri Baill. ex Hemsl..

== Description ==
Runyon's Esenbeckia is a small, multi-trunked tree that slowly grows to around 30 ft (9.1 m) in height and 2 ft (0.61 m) in diameter. The dark green, glossy leaves are trifoliate, with each leaflet 1–3 in (2.5–7.6 cm) long. Bark is whitish except for irregular copper-colored patches that exfoliate to reveal the greenish, lenticel-dotted inner bark, much like American sycamores. The star-shaped white flowers are about 0.25 in (0.64 cm) in width and have four or five sepals, with an equal number of petals and stamens. The flowers form in broad, terminal panicles and are produced biannually, once in late spring and once in September. The fruit is a thick-skinned, woody capsule roughly 1 in (2.5 cm) in length that has five carpels. When mature, carpels dehisce (break apart) to eject black, up to 1/3 in (0.85 cm) long seeds. Green capsules are distinctively orange scented, while leaves smell like lemons.

== Habitat and range ==
The vast majority of E. runyonii trees occur in Nuevo León, Tamaulipas, San Luis Potosí and northwestern Hidalgo in northeastern Mexico. It is relatively common on scree slopes in deep, protected canyons at elevations of 2,000–3,000 ft (610–910 m) in the Sierra Madre Oriental, but can also be found in the ecotones between Tamaulipan matorral and forested canyons. A few individuals exist in the Tamaulipan mezquital along resacas in the Lower Rio Grande Valley of Texas in the United States. It is possible that this disjunct population arose from seeds dispersed by flooding of the Rio Grande's drainage basin in the Sierra Madre Oriental.

== Uses ==
Post-sized branch cuttings from Limoncillo are planted in the ground during the dry season by farmers in Mexico. Eventually these will take root, forming living fences. Showy foliage and blooms make it an attractive ornamental.
