= Toddalioideae =

Formerly recognized subfamily of flowering plants

Toddalioideae is a formerly recognized subfamily of the family Rutaceae. Its type genus, Toddalia, is now accepted as a synonym of Zanthoxylum and placed in the subfamily Zanthoxyloideae.
