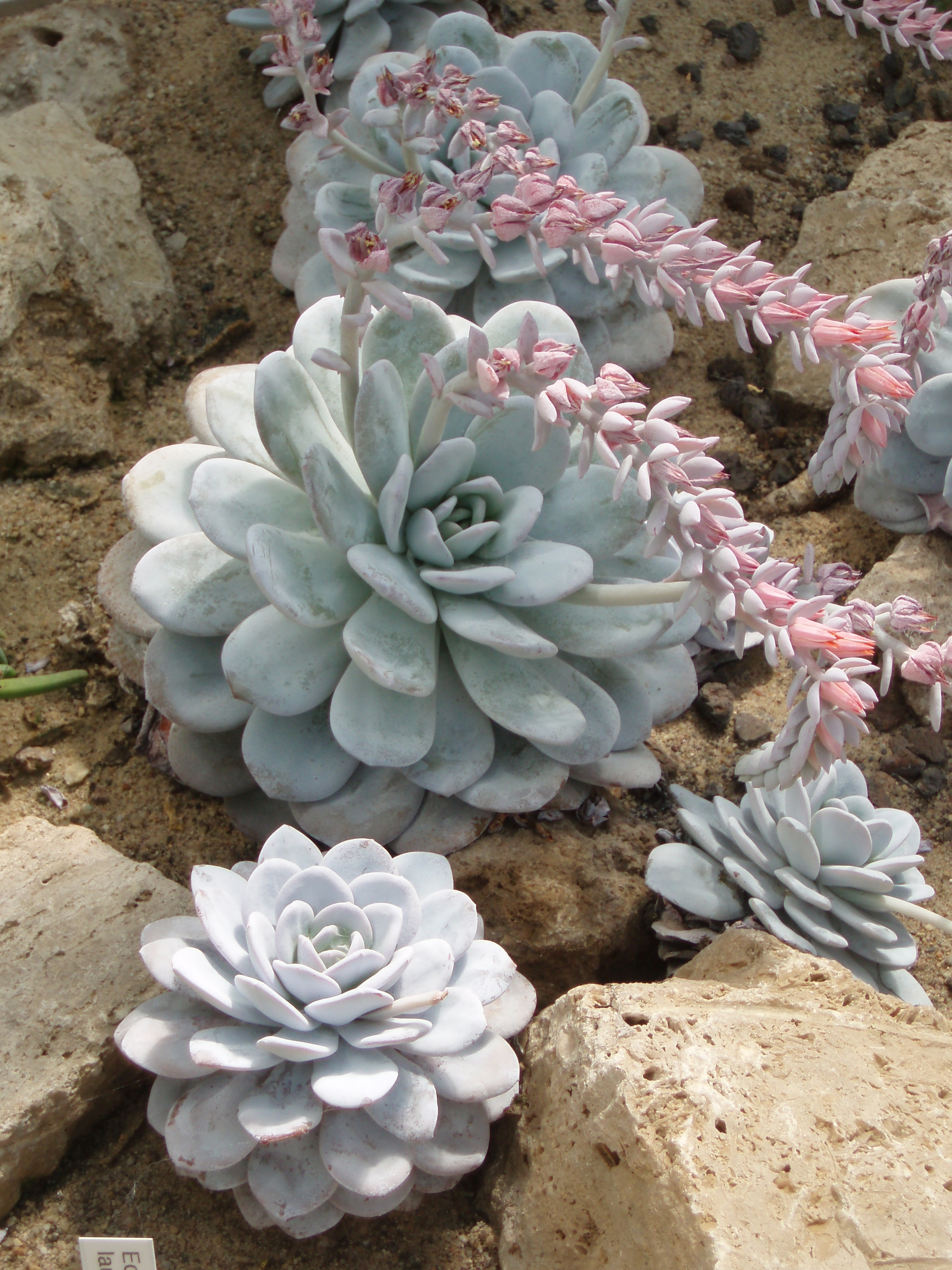

Scientific classification
- Kingdom: Plantae
- Clade: Tracheophytes
- Clade: Angiosperms
- Clade: Eudicots
- Order: Saxifragales
- Family: Crassulaceae
- Genus: Echeveria
- Species: E. laui

Binomial name
- Echeveria laui Moran & J.Meyrán

= Echeveria laui =

Species of succulent

Echeveria laui is a slow-growing perennial succulent plant native to the state of Oaxaca, Mexico. It is a popular decorative plant due to its distinctive pink color.

== Etymology ==
Echeveria is named for Atanasio Echeverría y Godoy, a botanical illustrator who contributed to Flora Mexicana.
