= Witte Museum =

Museum in San Antonio, Texas

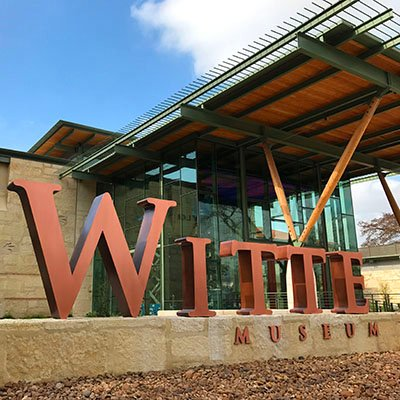
- Witte Museum in San Antonio, Texas

- location of the Witte Museum in Texas Witte Museum (the United States)
- Established: 1926
- Location: 3801 Broadway, San Antonio, Texas, United States
- Coordinates: 29.46187°N 98.467155°W
- Type: Nature History Science
- Visitors: 500,000
- President: Dirk Elmendorf
- Public transit access: 9, 10, 11A, & 14
- Website: www.wittemuseum.org

The Witte Museum (/ˈwɪti/ WIT-ee) is a museum located in Brackenridge Park in San Antonio, Texas, and was established in 1926. It is dedicated to telling the stories of Texas, from prehistory to the present. The permanent collection features historic artifacts and photographs, Texas art, textiles, dinosaur bones, cave drawings, and Texas wildlife dioramas, in addition to nationally acclaimed traveling exhibits. Artwork in the collection includes sculpture by San Antonio-born Bonnie MacLeary.

The Witte Museum is named after San Antonio businessman Alfred G. Witte, who bequeathed $65,000 to the city for construction of a museum of art, science, and natural history to be built in memory of his parents. The first director of the Witte Museum was Ellen Schulz Quillin.

== History ==
The catalyst for the Museum was an extensive collection of natural history specimens owned by Henry Philemon Attwater, which San Antonio educator and botanist Ellen Schulz Quillin purchased for the city of San Antonio for $5,000. When the growing collection grew too large for the high school where it was housed, Schulz and her supporters appealed to the city council for funds to build a new museum. With those funds and a $65,000 bequest from Alfred G. Witte, a new building was constructed. Established under the auspices of The San Antonio Museum Association, it was known as the Witte Memorial Museum until 1984, when the name was simplified to the Witte Museum.

In addition to natural and historic artifacts, the Witte collection included paintings, sculptures, drawings and other works of art. In 1970, museum director Jack McGregor proposed establishing a separate art museum. In 1972, with the support of several key museum trustees, the San Antonio Museum Association acquired the former Anheuser-Busch brewery, which would be renovated and remodeled. The San Antonio Museum of Art opened to the public on March 1, 1981. The Witte Museum Texas Art Collection focuses on works created by artists living and working in Texas as well as work by artists representing its history and culture.

== Renovations and additions ==
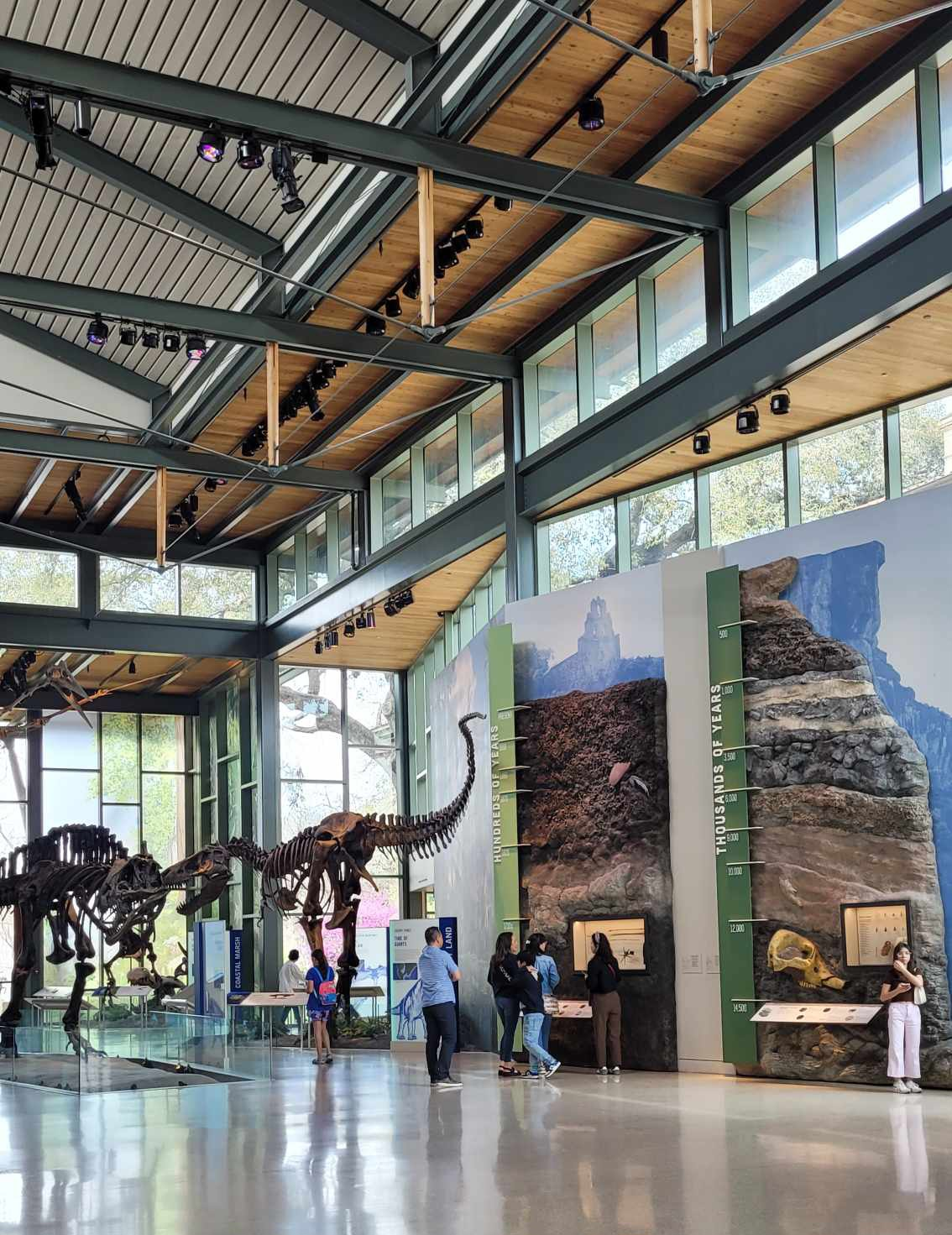
The museum's lobby

1930s: The Witte Museum's support of archeological research in the canyons of Big Bend and the Lower Pecos area resulted in important research findings and a growing collection of artifacts and led to the building of new galleries to house them, as well as a Reptile Garden, which was the vision of founder Ellen Schultz Quillin. The Reptile Garden not only provided a source of revenue for the Museum but provided income to South Texas ranchers and laborers who sold their rattlesnakes and rat snakes to the museums for $0.10-$0.15 per pound. The two log cabins on the property were constructed by participants in President Roosevelt's National Youth Administration program and are frequently used to teach students about pioneer life.

1940s: Two historic San Antonio houses were moved from their original locations to the Witte Museum campus; the limestone home of banker John Twohig, an Irish born pioneer San Antonio merchant, and the plastered stone home of José Francisco Ruiz, who was the city's first schoolmaster and one of two native Texans to sign the Texas Declaration of Independence.

1960s: Several new historic exhibits and improved art galleries were added, including the McFarlin Jewel Room and the Piper Memorial Wing, which houses temporary exhibits.

1970s: Thanks to the dedicated efforts of William A. Burns, museum Director from 1962 to 1970, The Lone Star Hall of Wildlife and Ecology opened to the public in March 1971 with dioramas of Texas wildlife.

1980s: Several major exhibits were added, including the Texas Wild and Ancient Texans.

1990s: The H-E-B Science Treehouse opened overlooking the San Antonio River, offering interactive science and physics exhibits to a growing number of students visiting the Witte.

2000s: In 2003, The Hertzberg Circus Collection was transferred from the San Antonio Public Library to the Witte Museum, fulfilling the wishes of owner Harry Hertzberg as expressed in his will. The oldest and one of the largest public circus collections, it includes artifacts, programs, prints and photographs, as well as sheet music, videotapes, professional journals and published manuscripts. Current President and CEO Marise McDermott has overseen a number of expansion projects since assuming the leadership role in 2004:

- The H-E-B Science Treehouse was transformed into the H-E-B Body Adventure, providing youth with the first interactive health experience in the US;
- The B. Naylor Morton Research and Collections Center opened, displaying more than 300,000 artifacts and providing space for scholars, archivists and students to view the growing collection;
- The 19,000 square-foot Mays Family Center opened as a multi-purpose exhibition and special events center.

In 2012, the Robert J. and Helen C. Kleberg South Texas Heritage Center opened to the public as a permanent home for the museum's South Texas collections, exhibitions and public programs, combined with the latest museum technology. The collections are links to the area's heritage and include saddles, spurs, basketry, branding irons, historical clothing, land grants, art and firearms.

In 2014, the museum began a $100 million renovation of more than 174,000 square feet of space to include the Naylor Family Dinosaur Gallery and Dinosaur Lab; Valero Great Hall; McLean Family Texas Wild Gallery; and Kittie West Nelson Ferguson People of the Pecos Gallery, as well as a new 350-car parking garage.

Led by Founder and President Patrick Gallagher, the design team of Gallagher & Associates created exhibit graphics, video animations, updated dioramas, touch screens and interactive displays, and numerous sound installations. This project had a goal of LEED certification, which it attained through designs which are environmentally friendly and sustainable.

Valero Energy contributed $4 million toward the expansion, which funded the glass-enclosed Valero Great Hall, an entry and lobby space featuring replicas of an Acrocanthosaurus atokensis, a Tyrannosaurus rex, and a suspended Quetzalcoatlus with a forty-foot wingspan.

The ribbon cutting and grand opening took place on March 4, 2017, and was attended by Witte President and CEO Marise McDermott, Texas First Lady Cecilia Abbott, US Congressman Lamar Smith, Bexar County Judge Nelson Wolff, Mayor Ivy Taylor and Councilman Alan Warrick, among others. "The New Witte" welcomed more than 90,000 visitors in the month following the opening.
