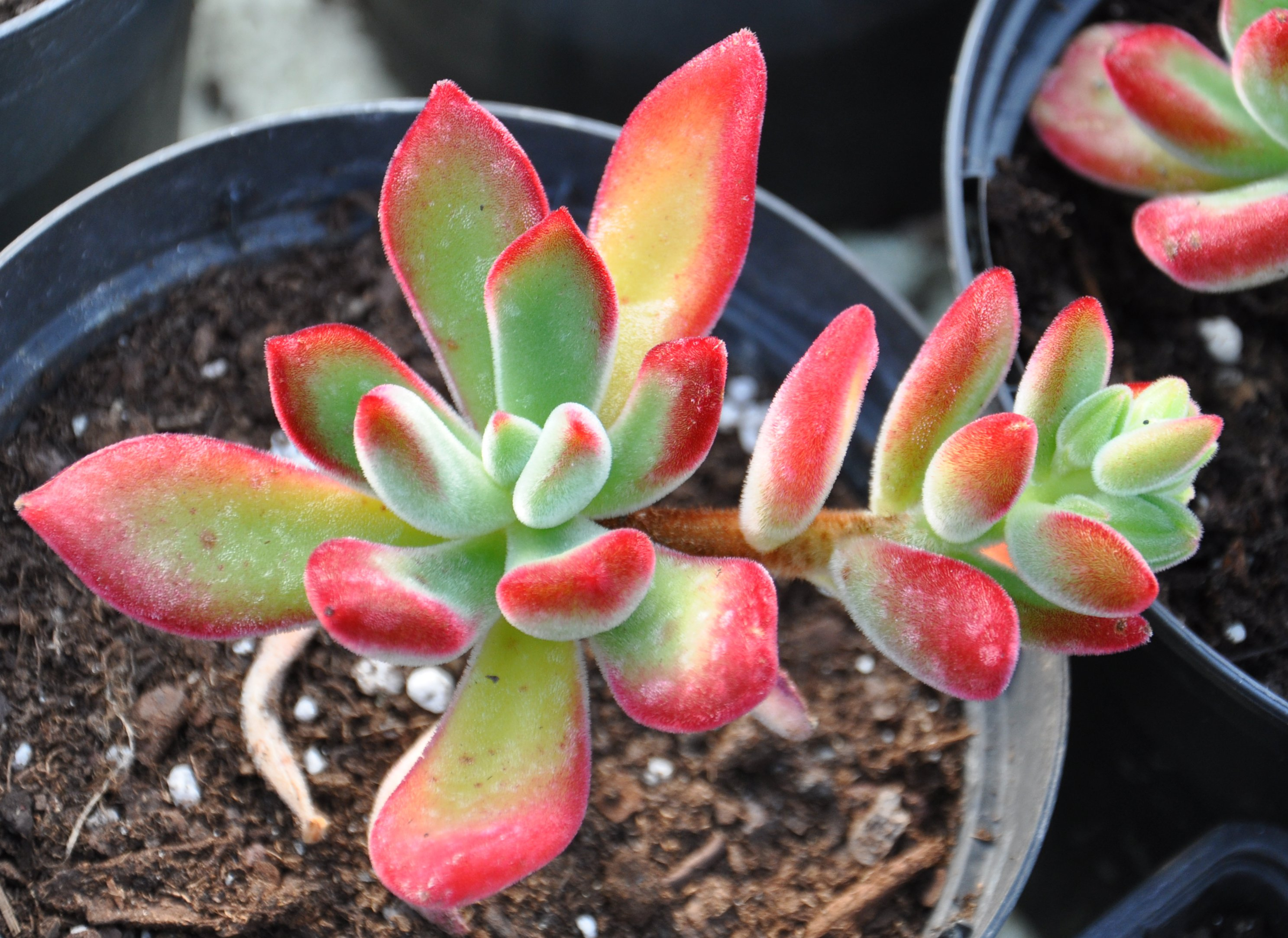
- 'Ruby' cultivar
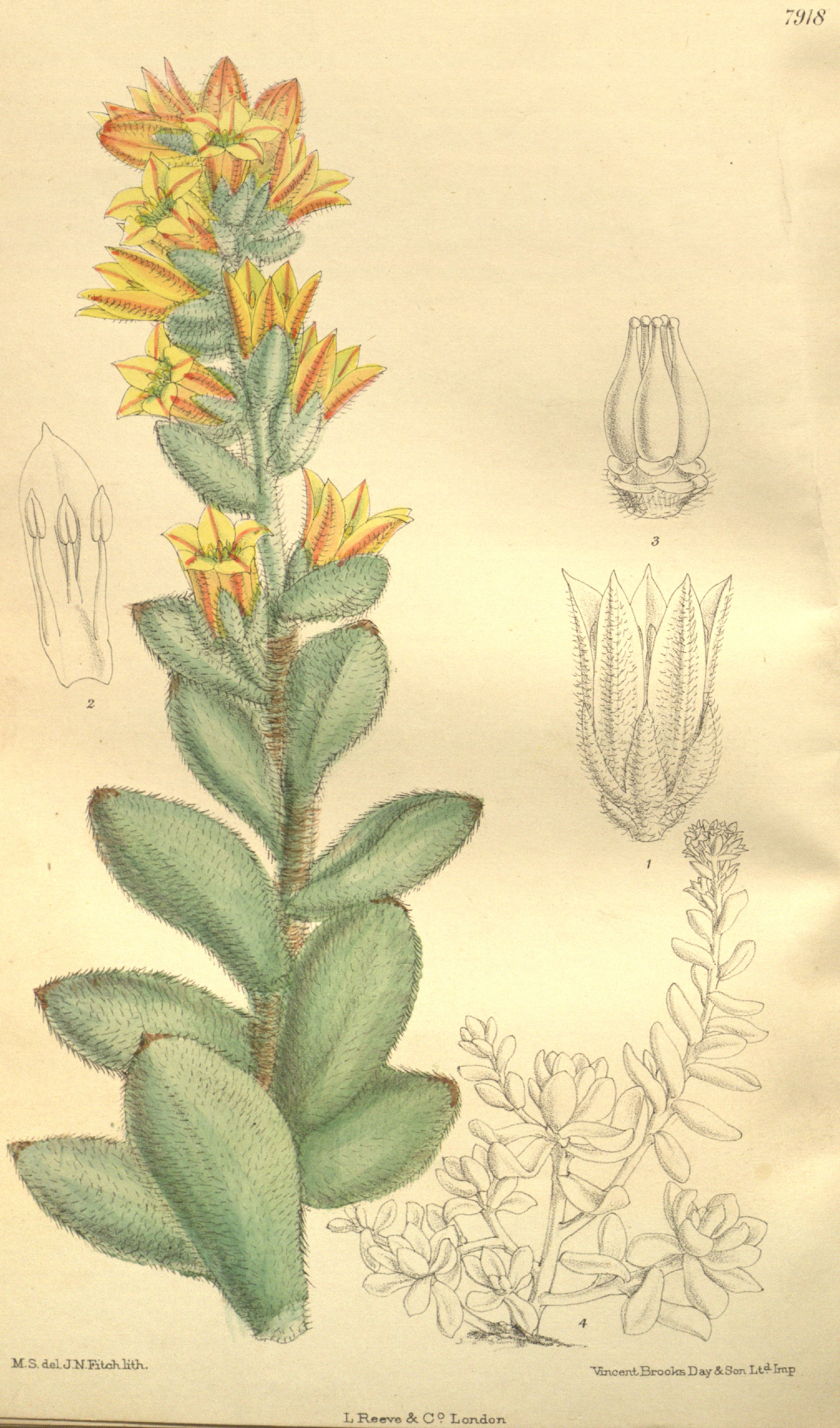
- Botanical illustration

Scientific classification
- Kingdom: Plantae
- Clade: Embryophytes
- Clade: Tracheophytes
- Clade: Angiosperms
- Clade: Eudicots
- Order: Saxifragales
- Family: Crassulaceae
- Genus: Echeveria
- Species: E. pulvinata

Binomial name
- Echeveria pulvinata Rose

Synonyms
- Cotyledon pulvinata Hook.f.; Echeveria leucotricha J.A.Purpus

= Echeveria pulvinata =

Species of flowering plant

Echeveria pulvinata, the plush plant, is a species of flowering plant in the genus Echeveria, native to southwest and central Mexico. A succulent, it has gained the Royal Horticultural Society's Award of Garden Merit. Its variety Echeveria pulvinata var. leucotricha, under the synonym Echeveria leucotricha, the chenille plant, has also gained the Award of Garden Merit.

== Subtaxa ==
The following varieties are currently accepted:

- Echeveria pulvinata var. frigida Kimnach
- Echeveria pulvinata var. leucotricha (J.A.Purpus) Kimnach
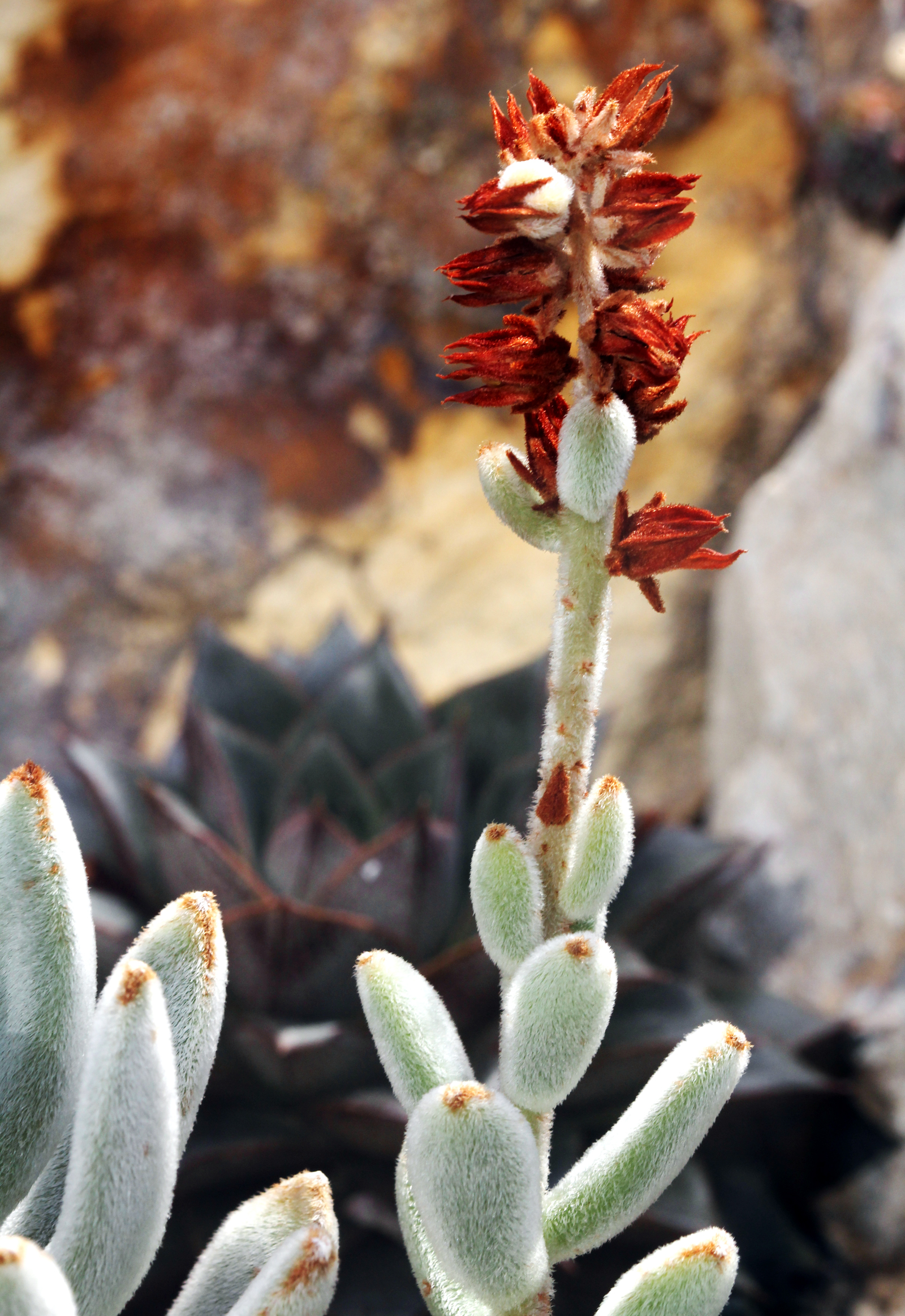
Echeveria pulvinata var. leucotricha

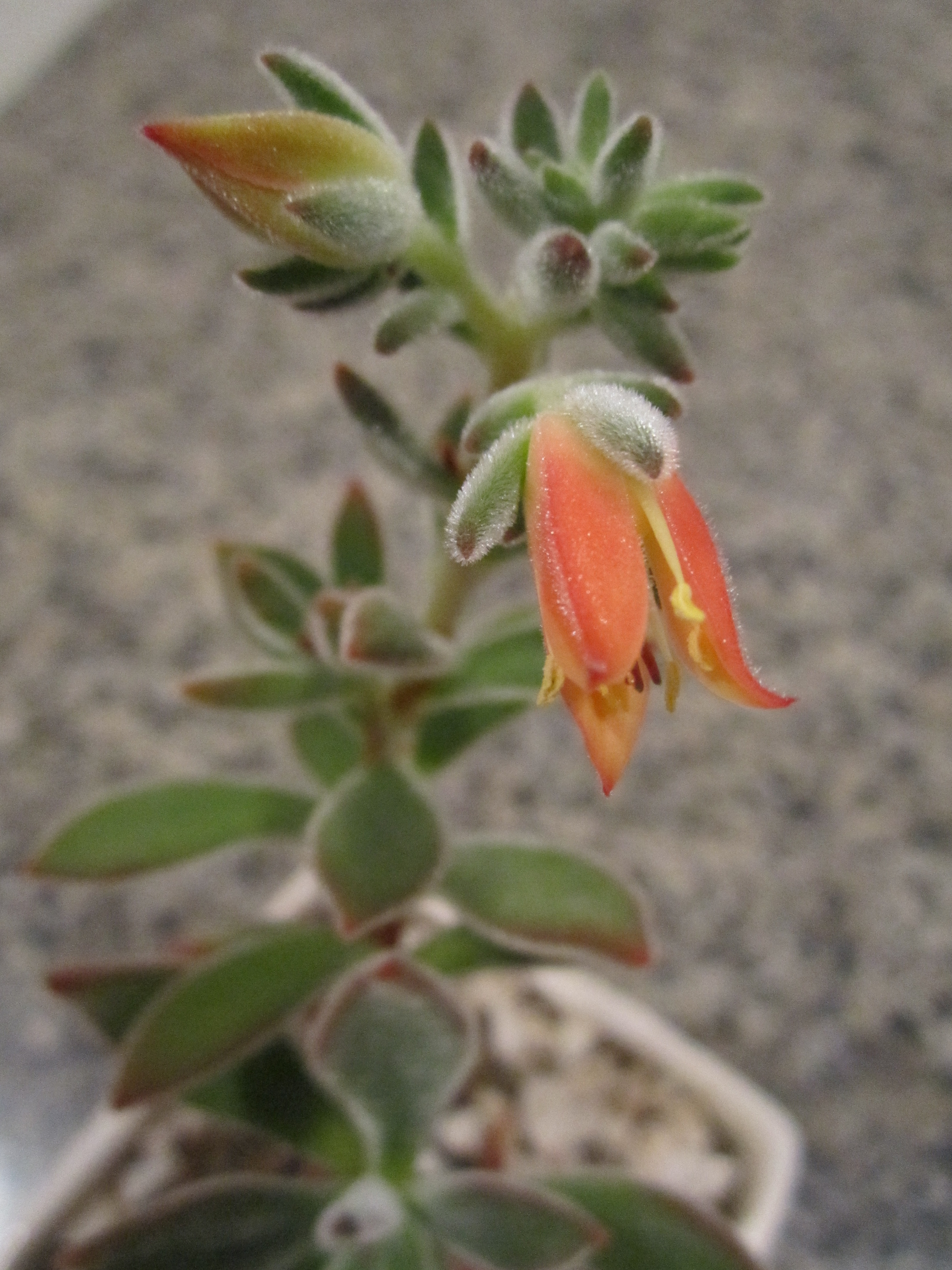
Bloom

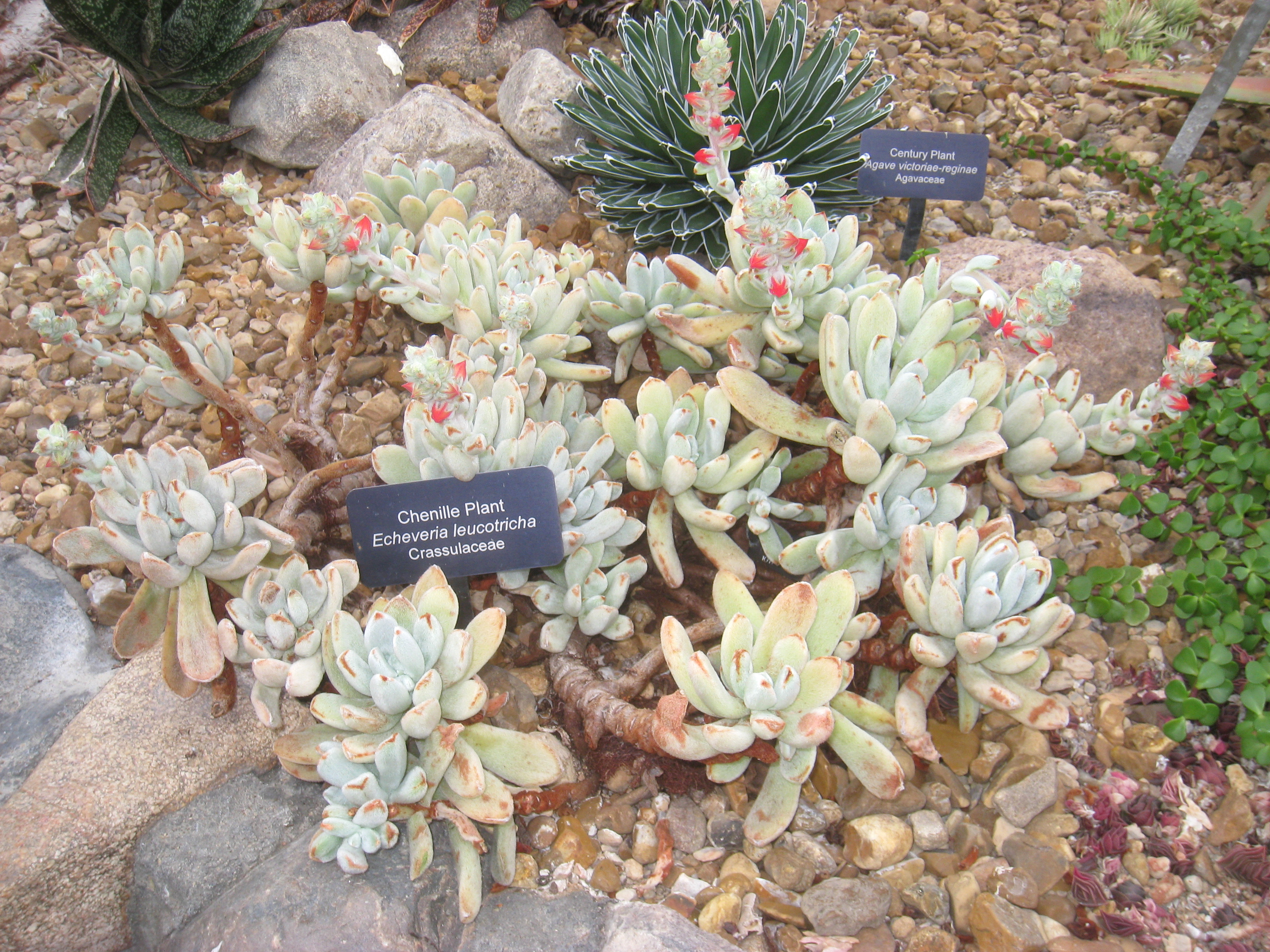
Echeveria pulvinata var. leucotricha habit

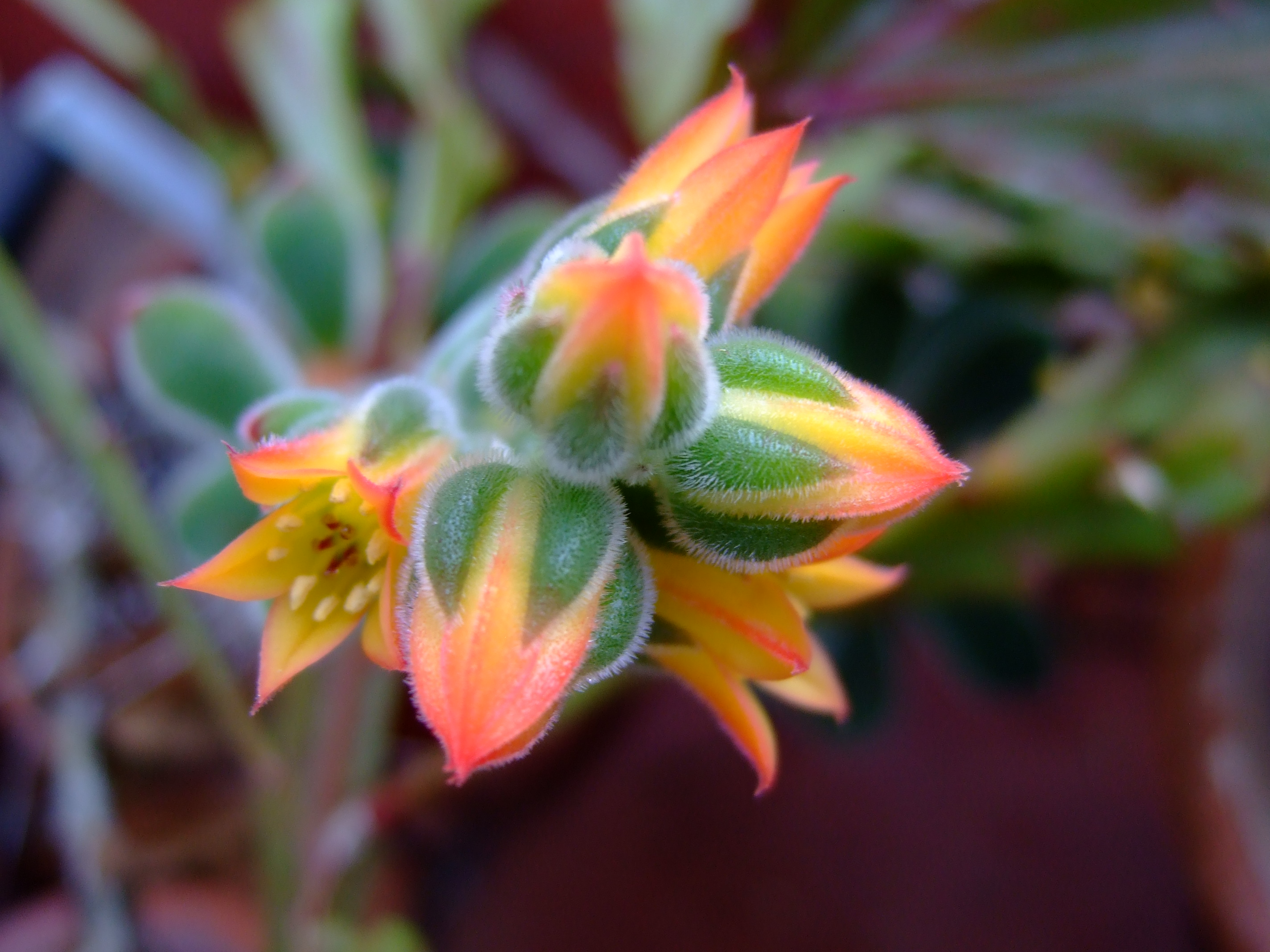
Close-up of flowers

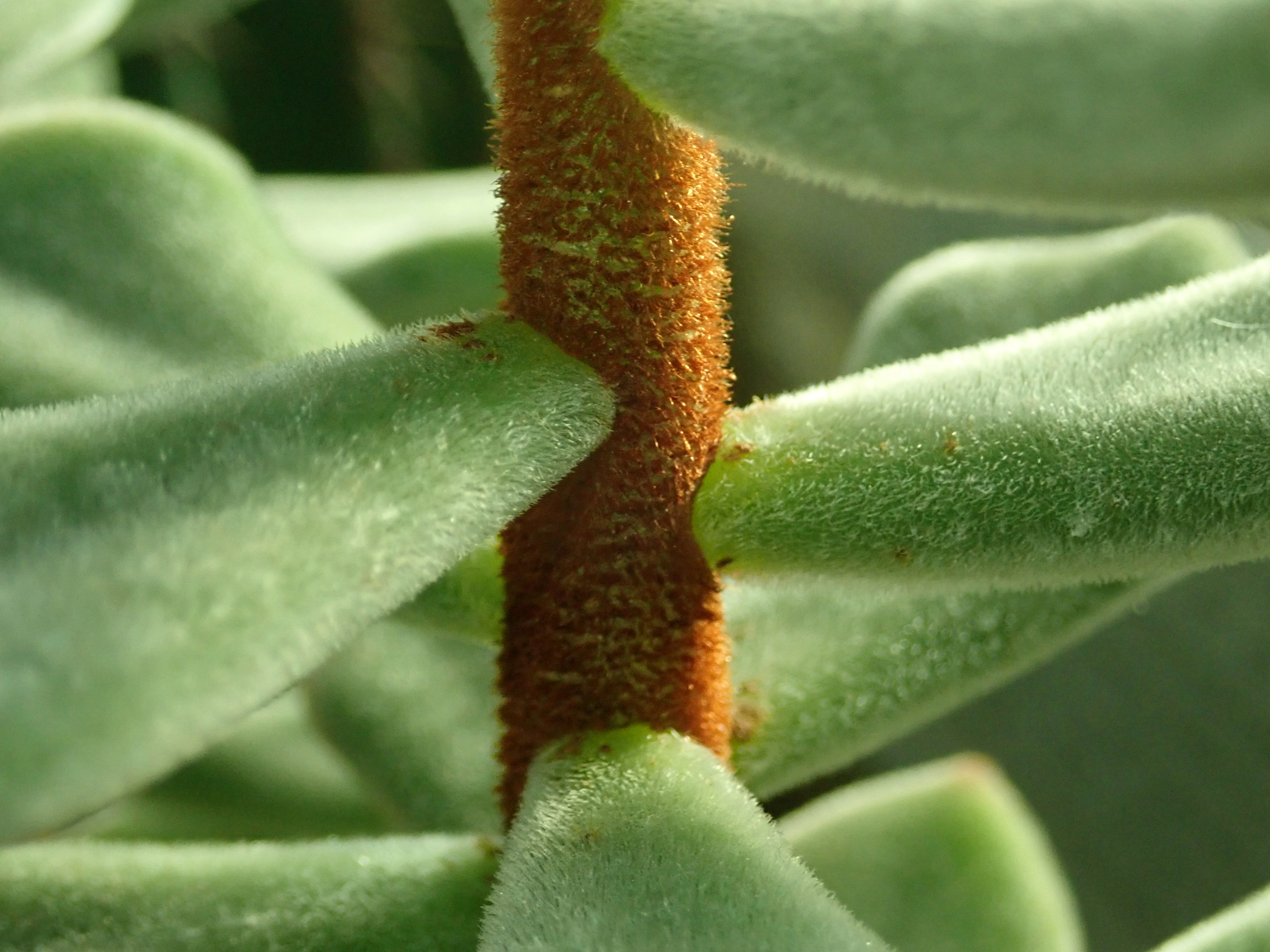
Close-up of stem

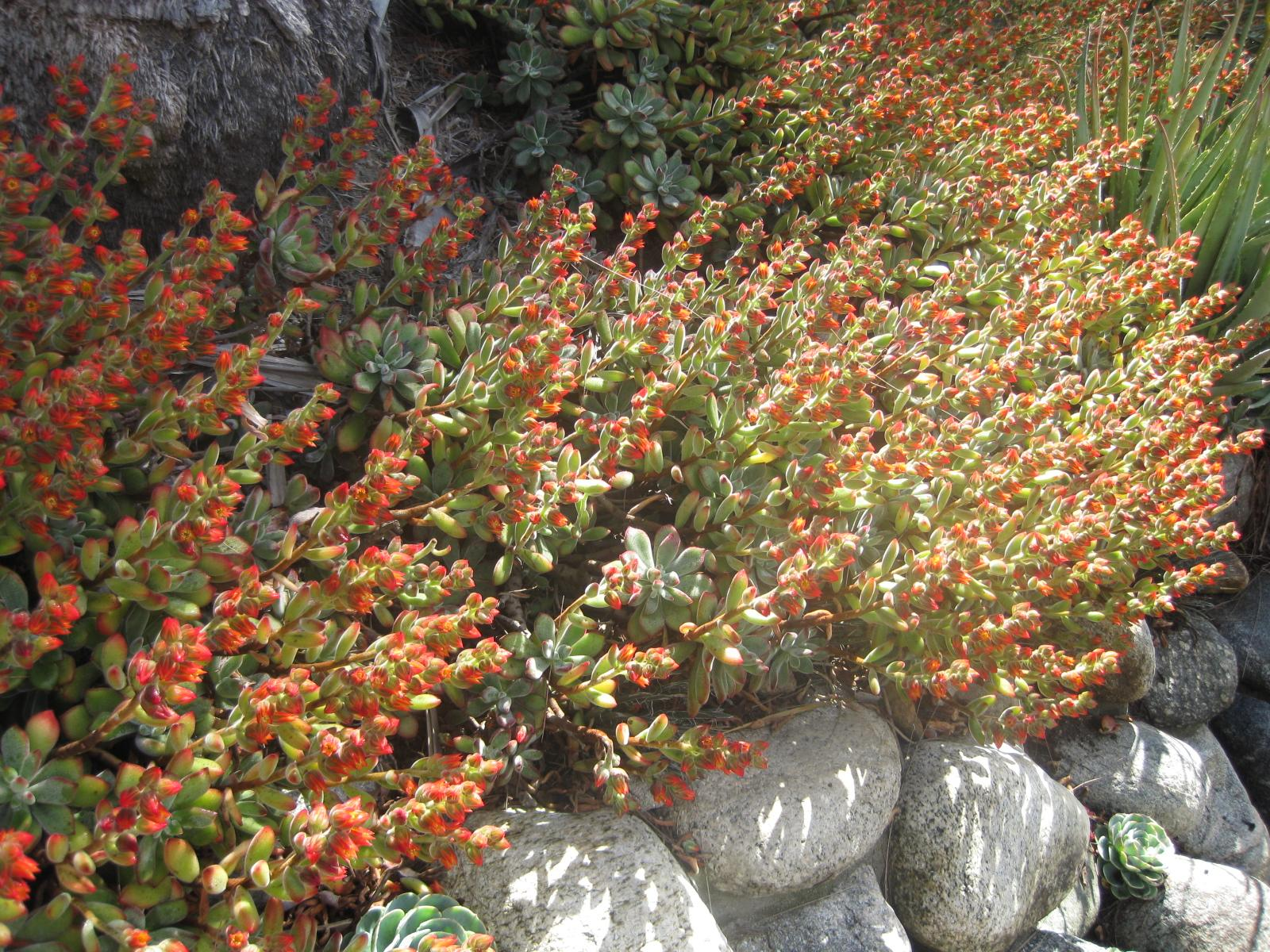
Massed

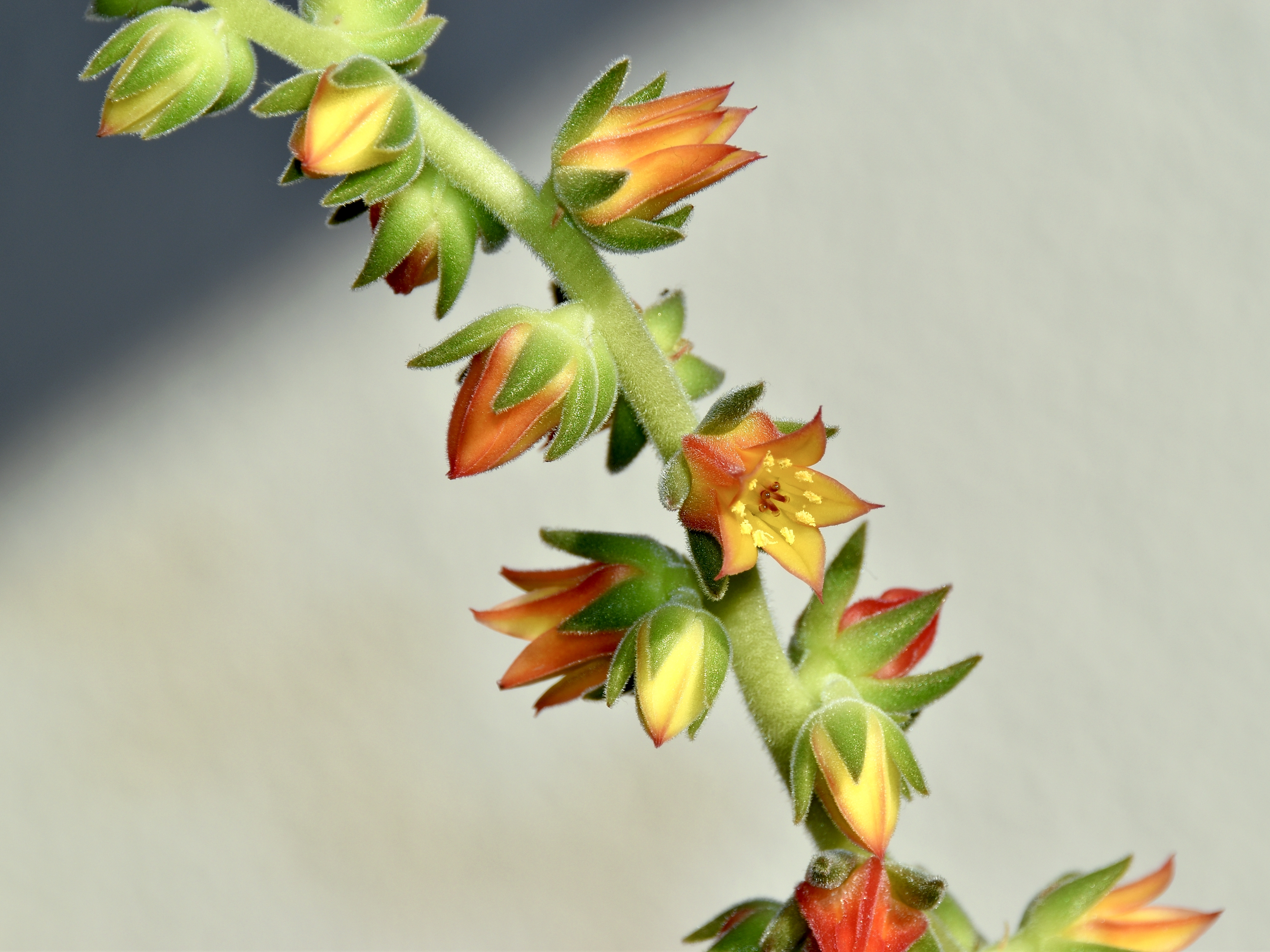
Close-up of flowers
