= Anna Goodman Hertzberg =

American musician (1864–1937)

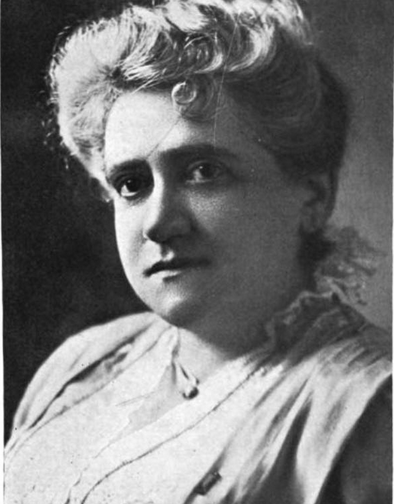
Anna Goodman Hertzberg (1864-1937)

Anna Goodman Hertzberg (January 24, 1864 – May 29, 1937) was an American clubwoman who served as the co-founder of an all-women's chamber music society, the first women's music association in Texas.

== Early life and education ==
Anna Goodman was born in New York City on January 24, 1864, the daughter of Solomon Goodman and Gertha Gratz Goodman. She attended the New York Conservatory of Music and was trained as a pianist under Sebastian Bach Mills.

== Career ==
In 1901 she founded the Tuesday Musical Club in her home in San Antonio, Texas, with her sister Jenny Sachs and several other women, to play chamber music together and promote cultural events. She was also founding president of the San Antonio chapter of the National Council of Jewish Women, organizer and president of the San Antonio Symphony Society, president of the Texas Free Kindergarten Association, and chair of the Texas committee for the Panama–Pacific International Exposition. From 1911 to 1913, she was president of the Texas Federation of Women's Clubs. She oversaw the opening of a night school for immigrant workers in the city in 1907, and sewing classes for young women. She was active in the city's "Battle of Flowers" parades for several years.

In 1909, before Texas women could legally vote, Hertzberg became the first woman elected to the school board in San Antonio.

== Personal life ==
Anna Goodman married Eli Hertzberg, a Russian-born jeweler, in 1882, and moved with him to San Antonio, Texas. They had one son, Harry Hertzberg. She was widowed in 1908.

Anna Goodman Hertzberg died in 1937, age 75. Her remains were interred at the Temple Beth El Cemetery in San Antonio.

Today, there is an Anna Hertzberg Music Memorial Building in San Antonio, across from a park she worked to create. The Tuesday Music Club is still active in San Antonio. The papers of the Tuesday Musical Club are archived in the University of Texas at San Antonio.

Her son Harry Hertzberg served in the Texas State Senate, and was a notable collector of circus memorabilia.
