= Esenbeckia alata =

Conservation status
- Least Concern (IUCN 3.1)

Scientific classification
- Kingdom: Plantae
- Clade: Tracheophytes
- Clade: Angiosperms
- Clade: Eudicots
- Clade: Rosids
- Order: Sapindales
- Family: Rutaceae
- Genus: Esenbeckia
- Species: E. alata

Binomial name
- Esenbeckia alata (H.Karst. & Triana) Triana & Planch.

Synonyms
- Kuala alata H.Karst. & Triana; Esenbeckia alata var. laevis (H.Karst. & Triana) Triana & Planch.; Kuala laevis H.Karst. & Triana

Species of flowering plant

Esenbeckia alata is a species of flowering plant in the citrus family, Rutaceae. It is endemic to Colombia. Common names include Winged Esenbeckia, Coya, and Cuala-cuala.
