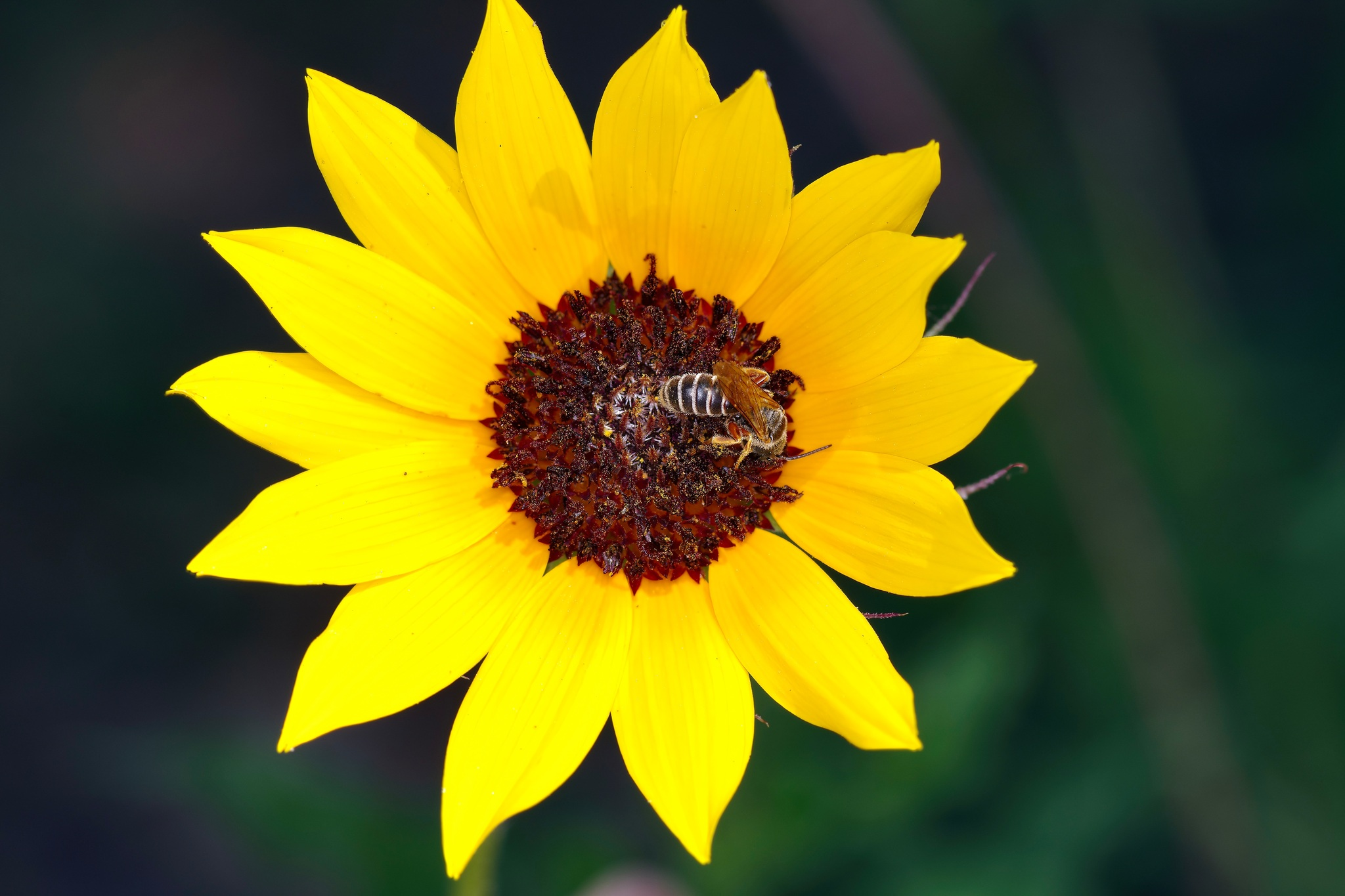

Conservation status
- Least Concern (IUCN 3.1)

Scientific classification
- Kingdom: Plantae
- Clade: Tracheophytes
- Clade: Angiosperms
- Clade: Eudicots
- Clade: Asterids
- Order: Asterales
- Family: Asteraceae
- Genus: Helianthus
- Species: H. praecox

Binomial name
- Helianthus praecox Engelm. & A.Gray

Synonyms
- Synonymy: Helianthus cucumerifolius var. praecox (Engelm. & A.Gray) A.Gray; Helianthus debilis subsp. praecox (Engelm. & A.Gray) Heiser; Helianthus debilis subsp. hirtus Heiser, syn of subsp. hirtus; Helianthus debilis subsp. runyonii Heiser, syn of subsp. runyonii; Helianthus praecox var. runyonii (Heiser) B.L.Turner, syn of subsp. runyonii

= Helianthus praecox =

Species of sunflower

Helianthus praecox is a North American species of sunflower known by the common name Texas sunflower. It is endemic to Texas. Most of the populations are either along the Gulf Coast or in the Río Grande Valley.

Helianthus praecox grows on sandy soils and coastal prairies. It is an annual herb up to 150 cm (60 inches or 5 feet) tall. One plant usually produces 1-3 flower heads, each containing 11-16 yellow ray florets surrounding 35 or more red or purple disc florets.

Subspecies

- Helianthus praecox subsp. hirtus (Heiser) Heiser - near Carrizo Springs in Dimmit County
- Helianthus praecox subsp. praecox - sandy soils along the coast in Galveston County + Brazoria County
- Helianthus praecox subsp. runyonii (Heiser) Heiser - Coastal prairies (from Calhoun County to Cameron County) and Río Grande Valley (from Webb County to Cameron County)
