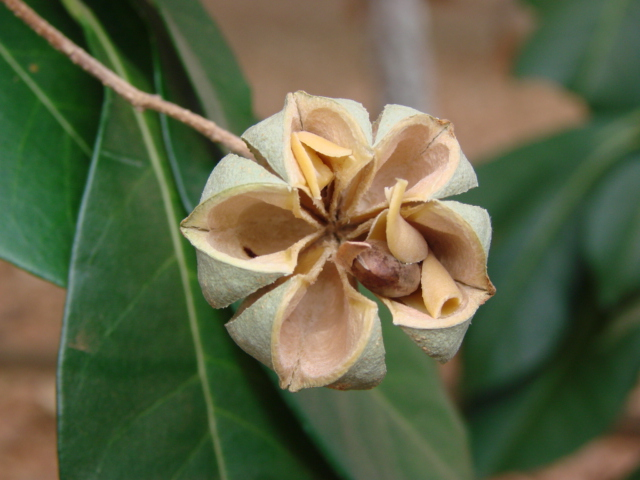

Conservation status
- Vulnerable (IUCN 2.3)

Scientific classification
- Kingdom: Plantae
- Clade: Tracheophytes
- Clade: Angiosperms
- Clade: Eudicots
- Clade: Rosids
- Order: Sapindales
- Family: Rutaceae
- Genus: Esenbeckia
- Species: E. leiocarpa

Binomial name
- Esenbeckia leiocarpa Engl., 1874

= Esenbeckia leiocarpa =

Species of flowering plant

Esenbeckia leiocarpa is a species of flowering plant in the citrus family, Rutaceae, that is endemic to Brazil. It is threatened by habitat loss.
