= Harry Hertzberg =

American politician (1883–1940)

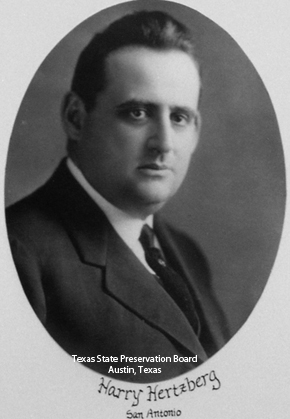
Harry Hertzberg

Harry Hertzberg (November 28, 1883 – August 12, 1940) was a prominent San Antonio lawyer, civic leader, and Texas state senator. Together with Tom Scaperlanda he donated the oldest public circus collection in the United States and one of the largest in existence originally to the San Antonio Public Library and now at the Witte Museum. He donated to the San Antonio Public Library almost 15,000 rare books.

== Biography ==
Harry Hertzberg was born on November 28, 1883, in San Antonio, Texas, the son of Eli Hertzberg (1845–1908), a Russian-born jeweler, and Anna Goodman (1865-1937), a clubwoman who served as the co-founder of an all-women's chamber music society, the first women's music association in Texas.

Hertzberg served as Texas State Senator on the 37th (1921) and & 36th (1919) Legislatures. He was a Democrat.

In 1932, Hertzberg represented Pompeo Coppini versus the Board of Regents commissioning the Littlefield Fountain.

Hertzberg, Tom Scaperlanda and Pasco Joseph Scaperlanda were early members of the Circus Fans Association of which Hertzberg later became president. Together with Scaperlanda, he donated the oldest public circus collection in the United States and one of the largest in existence originally to the San Antonio Public Library and now at the Witte Museum.

Tom Scaperlanda donated the elephant statue to Hertzberg which became part of the Circus Collection donated to the City of San Antonio and now at the Witte Museum. Scaperlanda hired a San Antonio cast-stone worker, Julian Sandoval, to cast the elephant statue and it was originally placed in front of Hertzberg's house on Euclid Avenue. The statue was part of fives, and one of them was donated by his owner, Joaquin R. Abrego, to be placed near the Hertzberg's one.

Hertzberg was also a rare books collector and he donated to the San Antonio Public Library almost 15,000 volumes about art, religion, biography, history, costume, and literature. It included: 100 original illuminated manuscripts of Christian and Islamic texts; a leaf of the Gutenberg Bible; a handprinted miniature medieval Bible on vellum (ca. 1250); a numbered, hand-printed copy of Walt Whitman's Leaves of Grass; a numbered and signed copy of A. A. Milne's When We Were Very Young (1924); a first edition in magazine format of Charles Dickens's Little Dorrit (1853); a first edition of Sir Walter Raleigh's History of the World (1614); and signed letters of F. Mendelssohn (1837), Henry Clay (1841), and Emile Zola (1890). When the library closed in 2001, the rare books collection was moved to the Central Library. Many of the books came from the Rosengren's Bookstore in Chicago, and Hertzberg often pushed Frank Rosengren to relocate to San Antonio, which he did in the 1930s. Rosengren's Books became the literary center of San Antonio.

He died on August 12, 1940, in San Antonio, and is buried in the family mausoleum at the Temple Beth El Cemetery.
