= NicOx =

Nicox S.A.
- Company type: Société Anonyme
- Traded as: Euronext: COX; Euronext Growth
- Industry: research and development in biotechnology
- Founded: 1996
- Headquarters: Sophia Antipolis, France
- Website: www.nicox.com

Nicox S.A. is a French ophthalmology company developing treatments to maintain vision and improve ocular health. Nicox is headquartered in Sophia Antipolis, France, and its Chairman and CEO is Michele Garufi.

Nicox is listed on Euronext Paris (Compartment B: Mid-Caps; Ticker symbol: COX) and is part of the CAC Healthcare, CAC Pharma & Bio and Next 150 indexes. Its pipeline includes three programs in development, and it has two U.S. Food and Drug Administration (FDA) approved products.

== Pipeline ==
Nicox's lead program in clinical development is NCX 470, a novel, second-generation nitric oxide-donating bimatoprost analog, for lowering intraocular pressure (IOP) in patients with glaucoma. NCX 470 is designed to release both bimatoprost, which is marketed under the brand name LUMIGAN, and nitric oxide following instillation into the eye. Bimatoprost is a prostaglandin analog, the most widely used class of drugs for IOP lowering in patients with open angle glaucoma and ocular hypertension.

The company is also developing NCX 4251, a proprietary formulation of fluticasone, for acute exacerbations of blepharitis. Nicox generates revenue from VYZULTA(R) in glaucoma and ZERVIATE(TM), or cetirizine ophthalmic solution, in allergic conjunctivitis. It has ongoing partnerships with Bausch & Lomb, Kowa, Eyevance Pharmaceuticals and Ocumension Therapeutics.

== Agreement with Ocumension ==
In 2019, Nicox and Ocumension Therapeutics signed an agreement to allow Ocumension the rights to develop and commercialize Zerviate, a cetirizine ophthalmic solution, for the Chinese and South East Asian markets. The deal would see Nicox eligible for up to $17.2 million, along with tiered royalties of between 5 and 9% of the net sales. In July 2021 the deal was amended and Ocumension paid $2 million to Nicox as an advance payment of future development and regulatory milestones.
