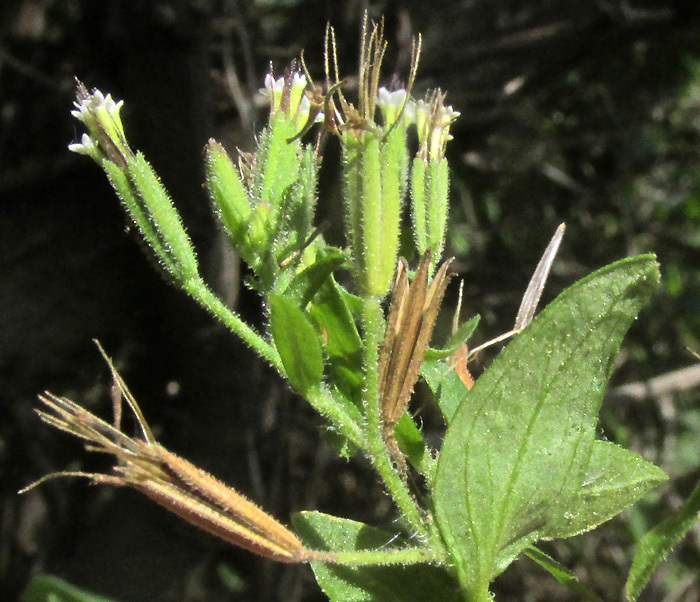
- Stevia micrantha flowering and fruiting stem tip

Scientific classification
- Kingdom: Plantae
- Clade: Embryophytes
- Clade: Tracheophytes
- Clade: Spermatophytes
- Clade: Angiosperms
- Clade: Eudicots
- Clade: Asterids
- Order: Asterales
- Family: Asteraceae
- Genus: Stevia
- Species: S. micrantha

Binomial name
- Stevia micrantha Lag.

Synonyms
- Stevia macella A.Gray; Stevia tenella Moc. ex DC.

= Stevia micrantha =

Species of plant

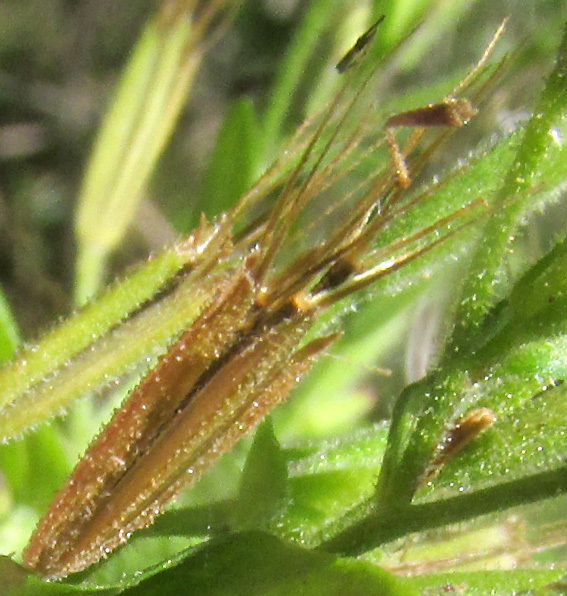
Fruiting head with needle-like awns atop the cypselae

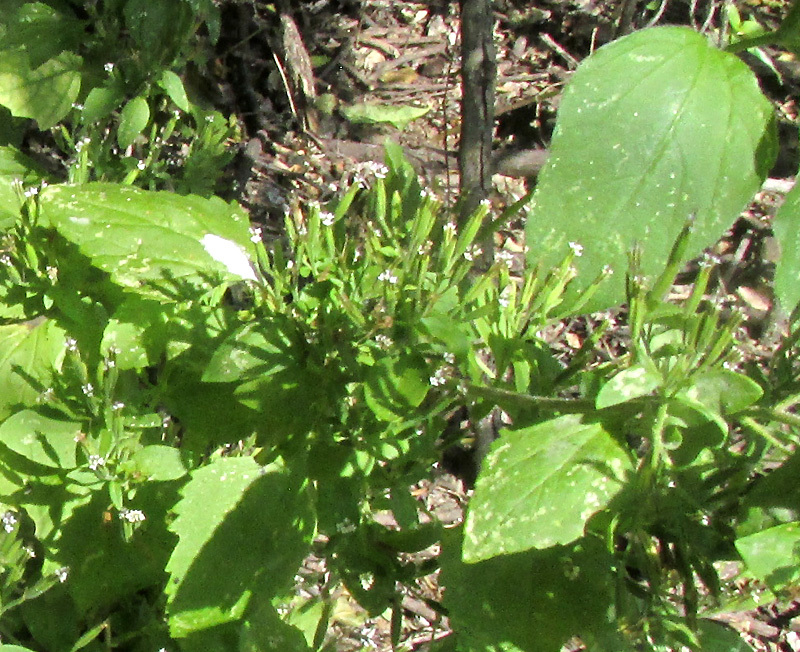
Flowering heads among stem leaves

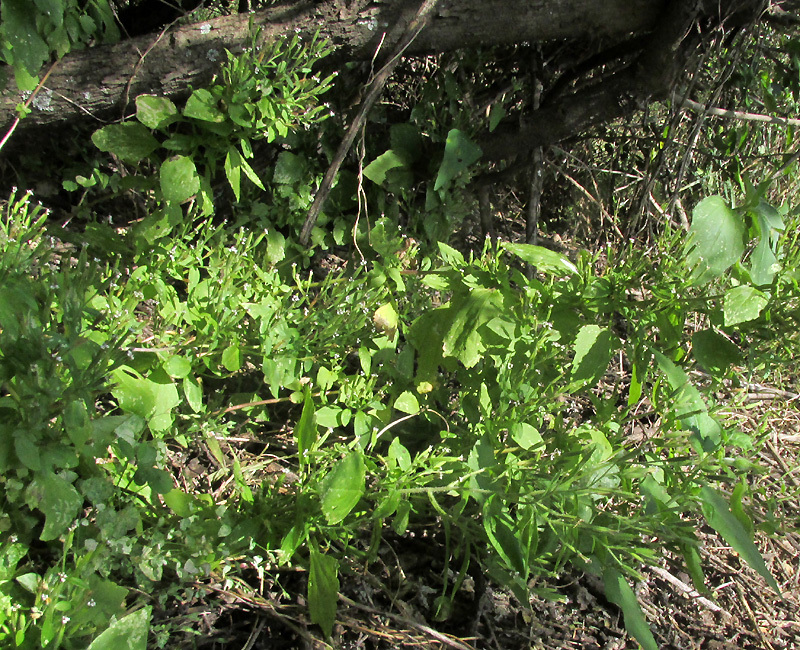
Plant in shaded, weedy habitat

Stevia micrantha, the annual candyleaf, is an annual plant native to the southwestern USA and most of Mexico. It belongs to the family Asteraceae.

== Discription ==
Stevia micrantha can be recognized by these notable features:

- Stems up to 70 cm (28 in) tall are usually solitary, more or less branched, and hairy with trichomes, with upper parts bearing glandular hairs.
- Leaves with petioles up 18 mm (1/2 in) long mostly appear in pairs opposite one another, though toward stem tips they may appear alone. Blades up 6 cm (2 1/2 in) long and 4 cm (1 1/2 in) wide are widest below their middles, are 3-nerved from their bases, and have saw-toothed margins. Blades may exude tiny resinous droplets.
- Inflorescences are basically corymbs with the flowering heads grouped both at stem tips and along the stem, making the whole plant look like a big, leafy inflorescence.
- Floral heads usually consist of 5 "disc florets" with white, cylindrical corollas up to 4.5 mm (1/8 in) tall. There are no "ray florets" with flat, petal-like corollas.
- Slender, blackish, one-seeded, cypsela-type fruits up to 5 mm (1/4 in) long have 5 ribs along their sides. Atop 4 of the cypselae there are 3 needle-like awns about 5 mm (1/4 in) long, sometimes seen extending beyond the corollas. The fifth cypsela, instead of awns, is topped only by a low crown of scales.

Note: The name Stevia is applied to a plant having sweet-tasting leaves, though sugar does not cause the sweetness; thus the leaves provide a sugar substitute much exploited by the food industry. However, the famous Stevia is Stevia rebaudiana, a native of Paraguay and Brazil. Only it and the less-sweet Stevia phlebophylla produce steviol glycoside, the chemical compound responsible for the sweet taste. Despite its English name of annual candyleaf, Stevia micrantha does not have leaves tasting like candy.

== Distribution ==
In the USA, Stevia micrantha is native only to the southeastern corner of the state of Arizona and contiguous southwestern New Mexico. In Mexico, the species occurs nearly throughout, except east of the Isthmus of Tehuantepec, which includes the Yucatan Peninsula.

== Habitat ==
In the USA, Stevia micrantha occurs in damp, shady, grassy openings of shady forests with oaks, pines and walnuts at elevations of 1,800–2,700 m (5,900–8,900 ft). In highland central Mexico it is found in dry scrub and grasslands at elevations of 2,250–2,700 m (7,380–8,860 ft). Images on this page show a plant in central Mexico at the shaded, weedy base of a hedgerow along a road through an area with scrub and ranches at 1,900 m (6,200 ft).

== Taxonomy ==
In 1816 when Mariano Lagasca formally named and described Stevia micrantha, it appears that he was referencing a specimen at the Royal Botanical Garden of Madrid in Spain, because with the description he adds the note "Elench. H.R.M. ann. 1805." Elench. refers to the catalog Elenchus plantarum published by the Royal Botanical Garden. The plant was said to inhabit "N. H.", a standard abbreviation for Nova Hispania, or New Spain. Also it is noted that seeds had been sent by "Sessé," which undoubtedly was Martín Sessé y Lacasta.

=== Phylogeny ===
Sequence analysis using internal transcribed spacers found Stevia micrantha forming a clade with other annual Mexican species of Stevia which, excluding one species, was sister to all other Stevia species tested. It has a chromosome number of n=12, which is thought likely to be the ancestral number for Stevia. It is suggested that the genus originated in Mexico, with later species arising in South America after the Isthmus of Panama formed a land bridge connecting North and South America.

=== Etymology ===
The genus name Stevia honors Pedro Jaime Esteve a Spanish physician and botanist of the early 1500s.

The species name micrantha is derived from two Greek word: mikros, meaning "small"; and anthos, meaning "flower."
