= Joseph Dombey =

French botanist (1742-1794)

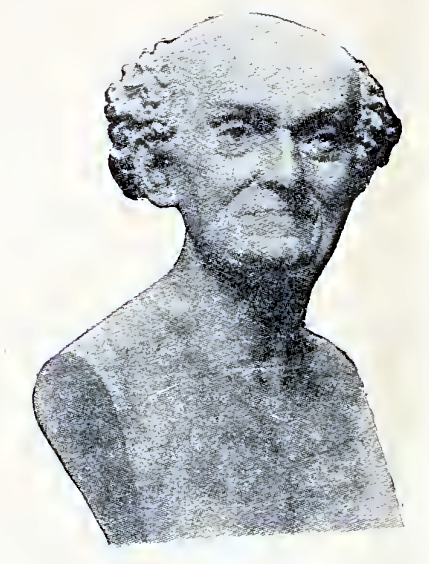
- Born: 20 February 1742; Mâcon
- Died: 18 May 1794 (aged 52); Montserrat
- Occupation: Botanist, botanical collector, scientific collector

Joseph Dombey (French pronunciation: [ʒozɛf dɔ̃bɛ]; Mâcon, France, 20 February 1742 – Montserrat, West Indies, May 1794) was a French botanist. He was involved in the "Dombey affair" which was precipitated by British seizure of a vessel his collections were on and diversion of the collections to the British Museum.

== Biography ==
He ran away from home and acquired a thorough knowledge of botany in Montpellier, where in 1768 he graduated in medicine. In 1772 he went to Paris, where he became assistant to the botanist Bernard de Jussieu, and in 1776 was appointed by Turgot botanist of the Jardin des Plantes.

A year later he was sent on an expedition to visit South America and collect such useful plants as could be cultivated in France. He arrived in Callao in January 1778, and soon gathered a large herbarium of the Peruvian flora, also accumulating much valuable information concerning the cinchona tree. In 1780 he sent a portion of his collection home, but the vessel containing them was captured by the British, and the specimens sent to the British Museum, where they are still retained, notwithstanding the subsequent claims by the French government.

Dombey sought at once to replace this loss, and soon had in readiness a second shipment, but the authorities of Callao confiscated over 300 original designs of rare plants on the pretext that works of native artists were not permitted to be exported to foreign countries. These designs were given to the Spanish botanists Pavón and Ruiz, who used them in their publication of La Flora Peruana.

In 1782, he visited Chile and collected the plants indigenous to that country. During his stay in Concepción the cholera broke out, and at once Dombey offered his services and was appointed physician-in-chief of the city, which office he resigned in 1783 when the epidemic had passed. He was then invited to examine the quicksilver mines of Chile; the mines in Coquimbo he put in working order, and discovered the mines in Jarilla, and although he spent considerable money in this work, refused all compensation from the officials in Chile, saying that he accepted payment only from the king of France. Finally he sailed for Cádiz, where he arrived in February 1785. Here he suffered the loss of half of his collections, which were seized by the Spanish government and himself imprisoned until he agreed not to publish his researches prior to Pavón and Ruiz.

Dombey succeeded in escaping to France by way of Le Havre, and secured, on Buffon's recommendation, an indemnity of 10,000 francs and an annual pension of 1,200 francs. His remaining botanical collections were transferred to the French botanist L'Héritier who had to flee to London with them when Spain demanded these also.

In 1793, he was sent on a mission to the United States to help with metrication, but was captured by privateers and imprisoned in Montserrat, where he died.

== Legacy ==
Dombey's collections are among the treasures of the British Museum, the Real Jardín Botánico de Madrid, and the Jardin des Plantes and the Muséum national d'histoire naturelle of Paris. His grand herbarium contains over 1,500 South American plants, of which more than 60 are new species, accompanied by valuable notes on the plants of Peru and Chile, their cultivation and use, and it is one of the most complete that exists in Europe of the flora of South America. Botanists have honored his memory by giving his name, Dombeya, to a genus of plants.

== Works ==
- Lettres sur le salpêtre du Pérou, et la phosphorescence de la mer (1786)
- Mémoires à l'académie des sciences sur les mines de mercure du Chili (1786)
- Mémoire sur le cuivre muriaté (1787)

Posthumous works (published by L'Héritier):

- Flore Perouvienne (Paris, 1799, 2 vols., in 4^{o})
- L'Herbier de Dombey expliqué (Paris, 1811, 6 vols., in 4^{o})
- Observations de Dombey faites au Chili et au Pérou (Paris, 1813, in 4^{o})

== See also ==
- Metrication in the United States § 18th century
