= Botanical Expedition to the Viceroyalty of Peru =

Spanish expedition to Viceroyalty of Peru and Chile (1777-1788)

The Botanical Expedition to the Viceroyalty of Peru (Spanish: Expedición Botánica al Virreinato del Perú) was a Spanish expedition to the colonial territories of the Viceroyalty of Peru and Chile between 1777 and 1788.

It was commissioned by King Charles III of Spain and headed by botanists Hipólito Ruiz López, José Antonio Pavón Jiménez and Joseph Dombey.

== Background ==
During the 18th century, Europe saw a flowering interest in the science of botany that in Spain crystallized in the organization of a series of scientific expeditions to Spanish colonial territories in America, the Pacific islands and Asia. King Charles III of Spain was very much in favor of this type of scientific research and provided funding for several explorations in the later part of the century.

== Preparations ==
Due to his formation under Casimiro Gómez Ortega at Madrid's Royal Botanical Garden, Hipólito Ruiz López was named head botanist of the expedition, with French physician Joseph Dombey and pharmacologist José Antonio Pavón Jiménez appointed as his assistants.

Two prestigious botanical illustrators, Joseph Bonete and Isidro Gálvez, also accompanied the expedition.

== Expedition ==
The expedition sailed from Cádiz in 1777 and arrived at Lima in April 1778. For over ten years, from 1778 to 1788, they explored the territories of present Peru and Chile studying and collecting specimens.

The expedition suffered all kinds of setbacks during this time, ranging from the sinking of the ship San Pedro de Alcantara in 1784 that carried numerous botanical samples, a 1785 fire in the Peruvian population in Macora that resulted in the loss of additional samples and equipment, to quarrels between the members of the expeditionary team, specially between Ruiz and Dombey, that resulted in the latter leaving the group in 1784. He was replaced by Juan José Tafalla Navascués that same year.

In 1788, the bulk of the expedition returned to Spain, leaving only Tafalla in Peru with a mandate to continue sending material. Painters Xavier Cortes and Jose Gabriel Rivera joined botanist Agustin Jose Manzanilla in 1793. Between 1799 and 1808, an herbarium was set up in the territory of present Quito (Ecuador) to further study the Huayaquilensis Flora, that continued making regular mailings of material to Spain until the death of Tafalla in 1811.

All together, more than 3,000 specimens of plants were collected and 2,500 life-sized botanical illustrations were produced, and when they returned to Spain they brought back a great many living plants, among which was a medicinal remedy for the flu as well as toothaches, using as a base the boiled sprouts of Buddleja incana.

The collections that arrived in Cádiz in 1788 were in the most part in good condition, and were housed in Madrid's Royal Botanical Garden and the Gabinete de Historia Natural, the precursor of the Museum of Natural History. The discoveries included about 150 new genera and 500 new species, which still retain the names given them by Ruiz and Pavón. Unfortunately, a part of the collection consisting of 53 crates with 800 illustrations, dried plants, seeds, resins and minerals was lost when the ship transporting it was wrecked on the coast of Portugal.

== Publications ==
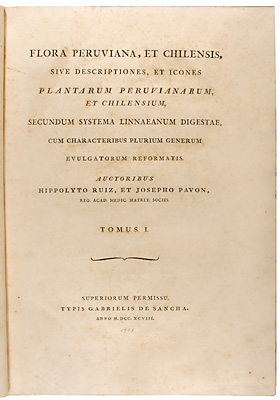
Flora Peruviana, et Chilensis.

Hipólito Ruiz López and José Antonio Pavón Jiménez published Flora Peruviana et Chilensis prodromus in ten volumes, richly illustrated with engravings of the specimens. The first four volumes were published between 1798 and 1802. The last six volumes were published after the death of Ruiz.

Ruiz and Pavón also published together Systema vegetabilium florae peruvianae chilensis in 1798, and Flora peruviana, et chilensis, sive descriptiones, et icones, between 1798 and 1802.

The journals Ruiz produced for his exploration of South America during these years are remarkable for their breadth of ethnobotanical and natural history knowledge. Of particular interest at the time was pharmacological knowledge of New World plants such as Chinchona, the source of the anti-malarial, quinine. In addition to detailed descriptions and paintings of the flora and fauna of Peru and Chile, Ruiz observed the geology and weather of the area, and included cultural information about the life of the Indians and the colonists of the area. The result of these observations was the publication of Quinología o tratado del árbol de la quina in Madrid, 1792, that was promptly translated into Italian in 1792, German in 1794 and English in 1800.

In addition to the detailed descriptions and paintings of the flora and fauna of Peru and Chile, Ruiz also reflected on the geology and the weather conditions of the explored territories. He also included ethnological information about the lifestyle of both the indigenous population and the colonists that had settled in those areas.

== Aftermath ==
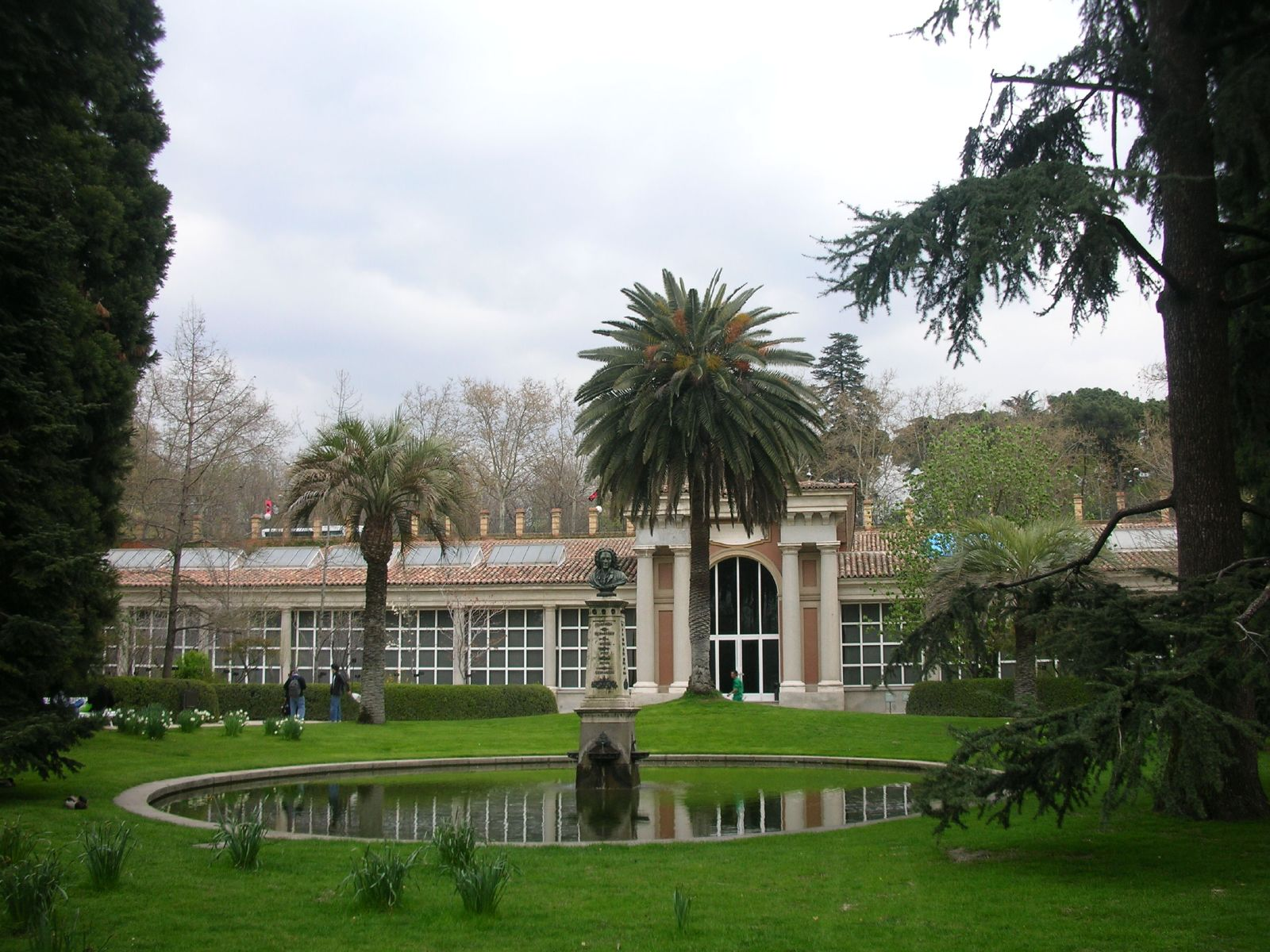
Royal Botanical Garden of Madrid

Hipólito Ruiz López was named a member of the Royal Academy of Medicine in 1794, and he published various works in that body's Memoires.

After Ruiz died on 1816, Pavón sold a part of the collections of the expedition to Aylmer Bourke Lambert, who had translated several botanical papers from the expedition, and to Philip Barker Webb. Thanks to Lambert, he was later elected member of the Linnean Society of London.

The main collection consisting of more than ten thousand engravings remained at the Royal Botanical Garden of Madrid, together with 2,254 botanical drawings with descriptions. Most of the documentation related to the expedition and the Flora peruviana publication is at the Museo Nacional de Ciencias Naturales, in Madrid. The ethnological material from the expedition can be found today at the Museum of the Americas, also in Madrid.

Also in the Archives of the Real Jardín Botánico in Madrid was Flora Huayaquilensis an expedition by Juan José Tafalla Navascués, a Spaniard who was one of the first who traveled to South America and documenting the different plants with wonderful paintings and written descriptions. All of this work was in the archives and only published by Dr. Estrella after searching the Real Jardín Botánico in Madrid archives and finding the informaction that formed, Flora Huayaquilensis and finally the life work of Tafalla was published.

== See also ==
- French Geodesic Mission to the Equator
- Royal Botanical Expedition to New Spain
- Royal Botanical Expedition to New Granada
