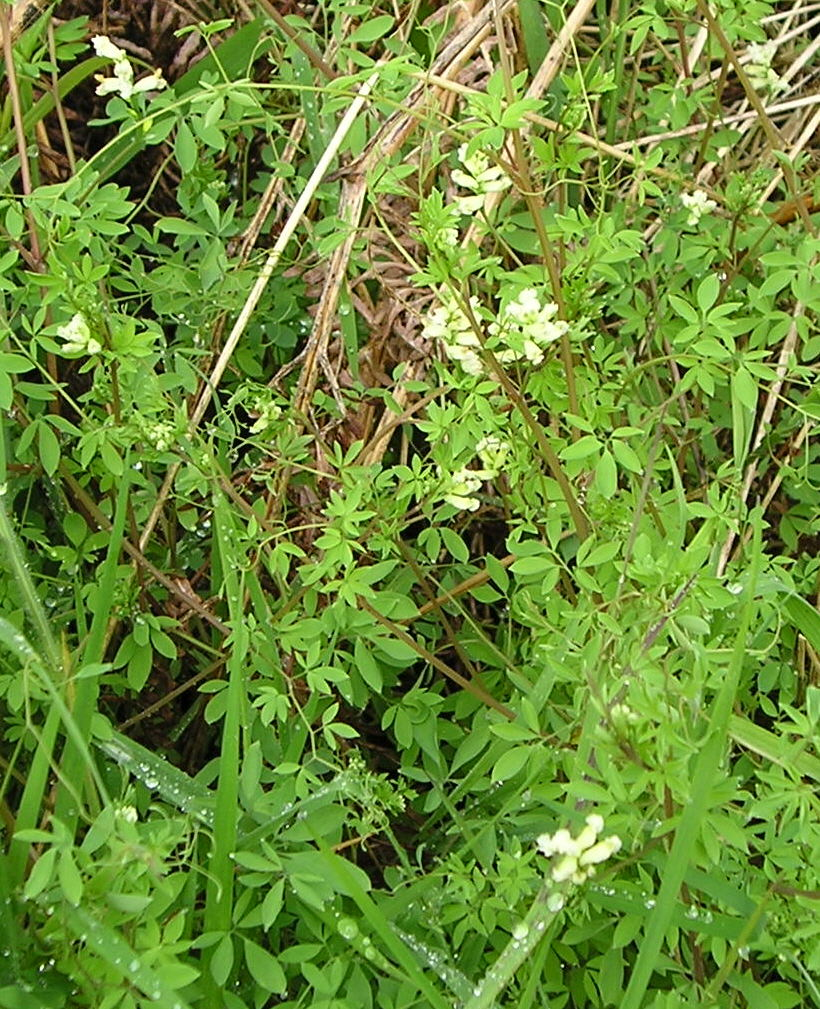
- Climbing corydalis

Scientific classification
- Kingdom: Plantae
- Clade: Tracheophytes
- Clade: Angiosperms
- Clade: Eudicots
- Order: Ranunculales
- Family: Papaveraceae
- Genus: Ceratocapnos
- Species: C. claviculata

Binomial name
- Ceratocapnos claviculata (L.) Lidén

Synonyms
- Corydalis claviculata (L.) DC.; Capnoides claviculata (L.) Kuntze

= Ceratocapnos claviculata =

Climbing corydalis

Species of plant

Ceratocapnos claviculata, the climbing corydalis, is a weak scrambling plant in the family Papaveraceae. It is endemic to Europe, growing mostly near the Atlantic fringe.

== Description ==
This delicate looking plant is a hairless annual (or occasionally perennial) up to a metre tall with weak, often pinkish, clambering stems. The leaves are pale to medium green, doubly compound, the leaflets being well-stalked and divided into three to five sub-leaflets, and ending in a branching tendril. It blooms between May and September in the UK. The flowers are small, about 6 mm (0.24 in) long, pale creamy-yellow, in short axilliary spikes. Each flower is elongated and tubular with a lip and spur and stamens in two bundles. The seed pods are short, usually narrowing between the two seeds.

== Taxonomy ==
It was first published as Ceratocapnos claviculata by Magnus Lidén in 'Anales Jard. Bot. Madrid' vol.41 on page 221 in 1984, based on an earlier description by Carl Linnaeus under the name Fumaria claviculata.

The Latin specific epithet claviculata refers to having tendrils or being tendrilled.

== Distribution ==
This species is known from several countries in western Europe, Belgium, Denmark, France, Germany, Ireland, Netherlands, Spain, Portugal and Norway. The largest proportion of the global population is found in the United Kingdom. It grows in most counties in Britain especially the more western ones, but is absent from Orkney, Shetland and the Outer Hebrides and rare in Ireland. UK conservation status is least concern as of 2005.

== Ecology ==
Climbing corydalis tends to grow on the edges of woodlands and previously wooded sites. It prefers acid soils, sandy or peaty, and usually in sheltered and half shaded positions. It is sometimes abundant in disturbed parts of recently cleared plantations or woods, clambering over wood debris. It grows well in impoverished soil under bracken, perhaps because it flowers early in the year before the fronds develop fully. It is the food plant for the weevil, Procas granulicollis and the beetle, Sirocalodes mixtus. Pollination is by honey bees and bumblebees.
