= Jarilla =

Jarilla may refer to:

- Jarilla (genus), a genus of plants in the family Caricaceae
- Jarilla, a Spanish language common name for plants in the genus Larrea
- Jarilla, Cáceres, a municipality in the province of Cáceres, Extremadura, Spain
- Jarilla, San Luis, a municipality in the province of San Luis in central Argentina
