= Eduardo Aguirre =

Eduardo Aguirre may refer to:

- Eduardo Aguirre (diplomat) (born 1946), United States Ambassador to Spain and Andorra from 2005 to 2009
- Eduardo Aguirre (footballer) (born 1998), Mexican footballer for Liga MX club Santos Laguna
- Eduardo Estrella Aguirre (1941–1996), Ecuadorian physician and researcher
