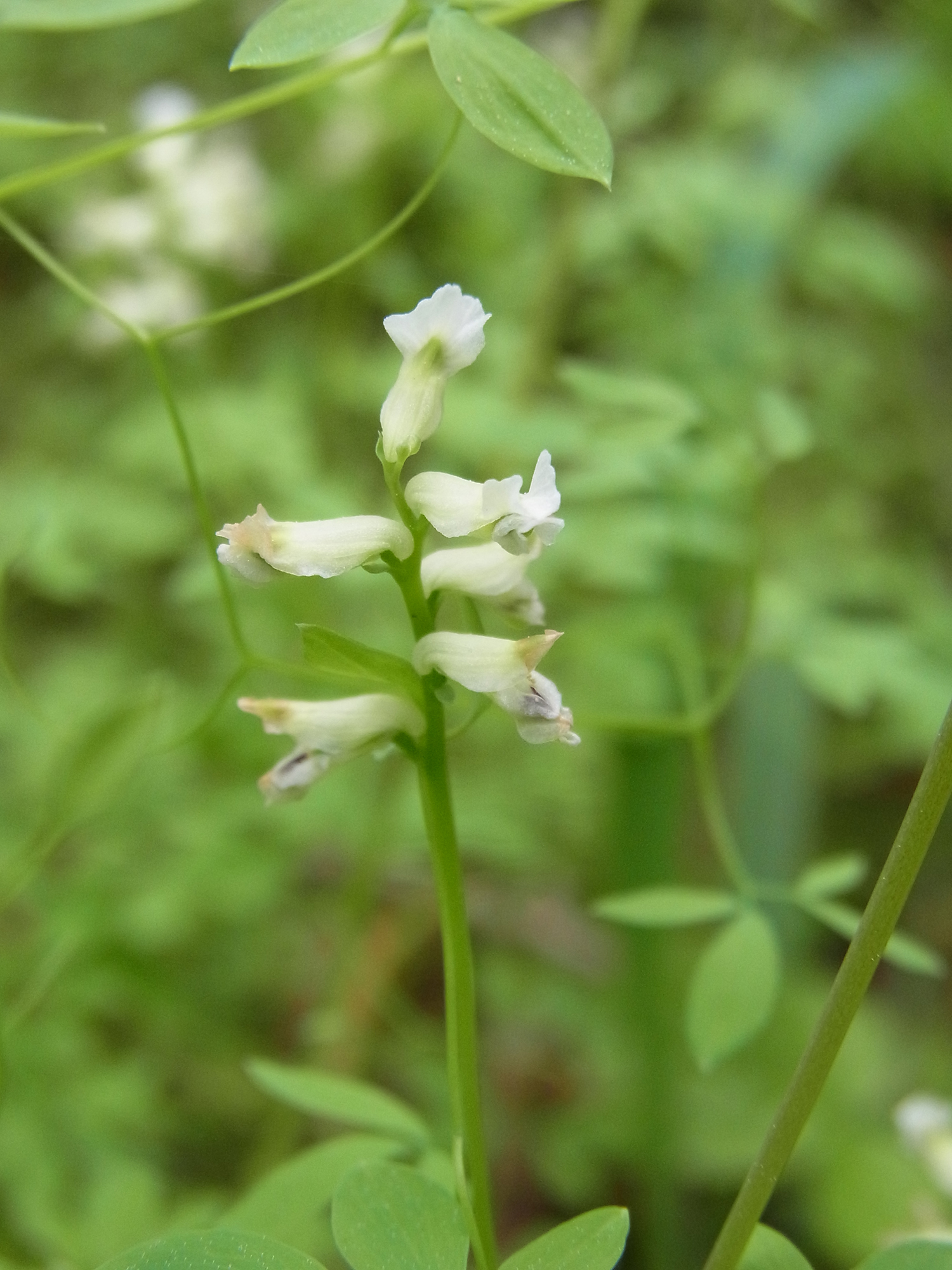
- Ceratocapnos claviculata

Scientific classification
- Kingdom: Plantae
- Clade: Tracheophytes
- Clade: Angiosperms
- Clade: Eudicots
- Order: Ranunculales
- Family: Papaveraceae
- Subfamily: Fumarioideae
- Tribe: Fumarieae
- Subtribe: Fumariinae
- Genus: Ceratocapnos; Durieu

= Ceratocapnos =

Genus of flowering plants

Ceratocapnos is a genus of flowering plants belonging to the family Papaveraceae.

Its native range is Europe, Mediterranean and Western Asia.

Species:

- Ceratocapnos claviculata (L.) Lidén
- Ceratocapnos heterocarpa Durieu
- Ceratocapnos turbinata (DC.) Lidén
