= Ecuador National Museum of Medicine =

Ecuadorian national museum

Coordinates: 0.2234°S 78.5155°W

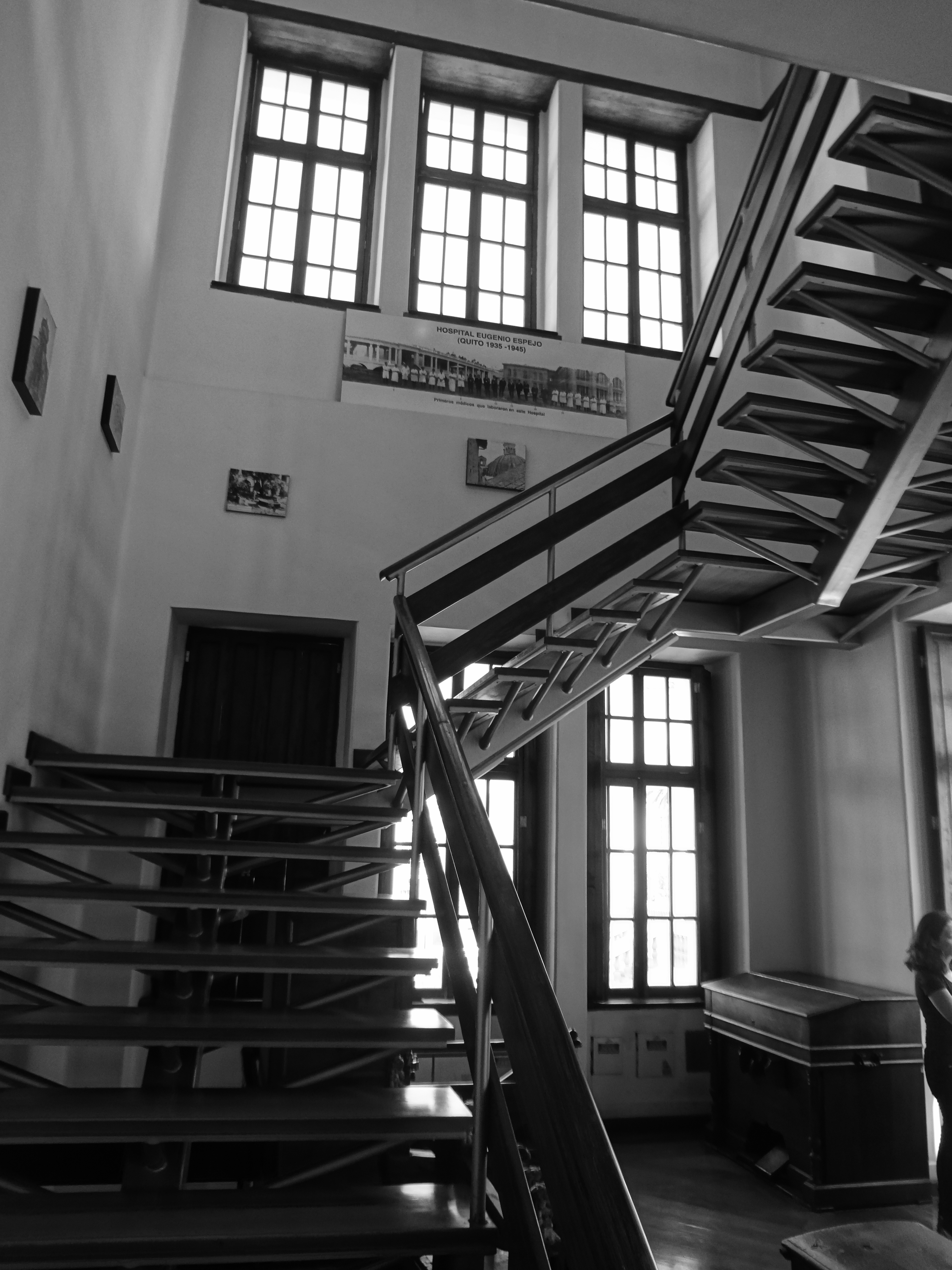
Museum interior

The Ecuador National Museum of Medicine is located in Quito, Ecuador.

== Mission ==
Dr. Eduardo Estrella founded Ecuador's National Museum of Medicine on 5 March 1982. Estrella's mission was to paint a full picture of the native, natural medicine of South America and to preserve Ecuadoran heritage. The main elements of the museum include Aboriginal Medical Food, nutrition and health, medical archeology, and medicinal plants. There is a full museum with Dential equipment from the late 17th, 18th through the very start 19th century such as Antique Microscopes, Antique Medicine Bottles, medical instrument literature and a complete library of knowledge and language of Andian Medicine Plants.

There are also sections dedicated to Colonial medicine in South America, as well as institutionalization of academic medicine, hospitals, and medical education.

Dr. Eduardo Estrella studied medicine at the Central University of Ecuador. After graduation, Dr Estrella did his Postgraduate education on Radiotherapy at Massachusetts Institute of Technology in Cambridge, Massachusetts, United States from 1968 to 1970. He did his specialized studies in psychiatry at the University of Navarra, Pamplona from 1970 to 1973, Spain. Aguirre later chaired the medical faculty at the Central University of Ecuador. Dr Estrella got his doctoral degree from the Catholic University of Quito in the 1980s. This was after he had published extensively on Andian medicine and on the history of medicine.

== Archives ==
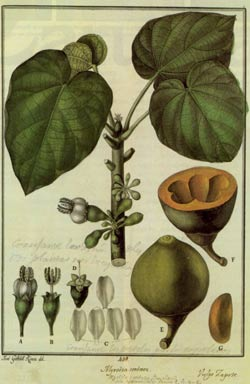
One of the paintings from a book in the collection, Flora Huayaquilensis

The Dr. Eduardo Estrella National Museum of Medicine library has been established to collect, protect, classify and catalog the medical, administrative and economic documentation of health institutions for Ecuador. The library is composed of more than 15 documentaries funds, corresponding to approximately 10,000 boxes and hardcover volumes. The Museum and Library are located in Hall No. 5 Eugenio Espejo Convention Center (lanes Sodiro and Valparaiso). Open Monday to Saturday from 8:30 to 3:00 pm.

== Exhibits and Collections ==
The museum displays a wide range of historical medical instruments, documents, books, and artifacts used in traditional and modern medicine. It features exhibits on pre-Columbian indigenous healing practices, colonial-era medicine, and the evolution of medical science in the country. Historical Significance:

It covers different periods, including indigenous medicine, colonial medicine, the republican era, and modern advancements, providing insight into how medicine has evolved in Ecuador. There are sections dedicated to the development of specific medical fields such as surgery, pharmacology, and dentistry. Educational and Cultural Role:

The museum serves as an educational resource, offering insights into the intersection of culture, history, and science in the development of healthcare in Ecuador. It frequently hosts events, lectures, and guided tours for students, medical professionals, and the general public. Located in the heart of Quito, this museum is an important cultural institution that offers visitors a unique perspective on the history of health and medicine in Ecuador.

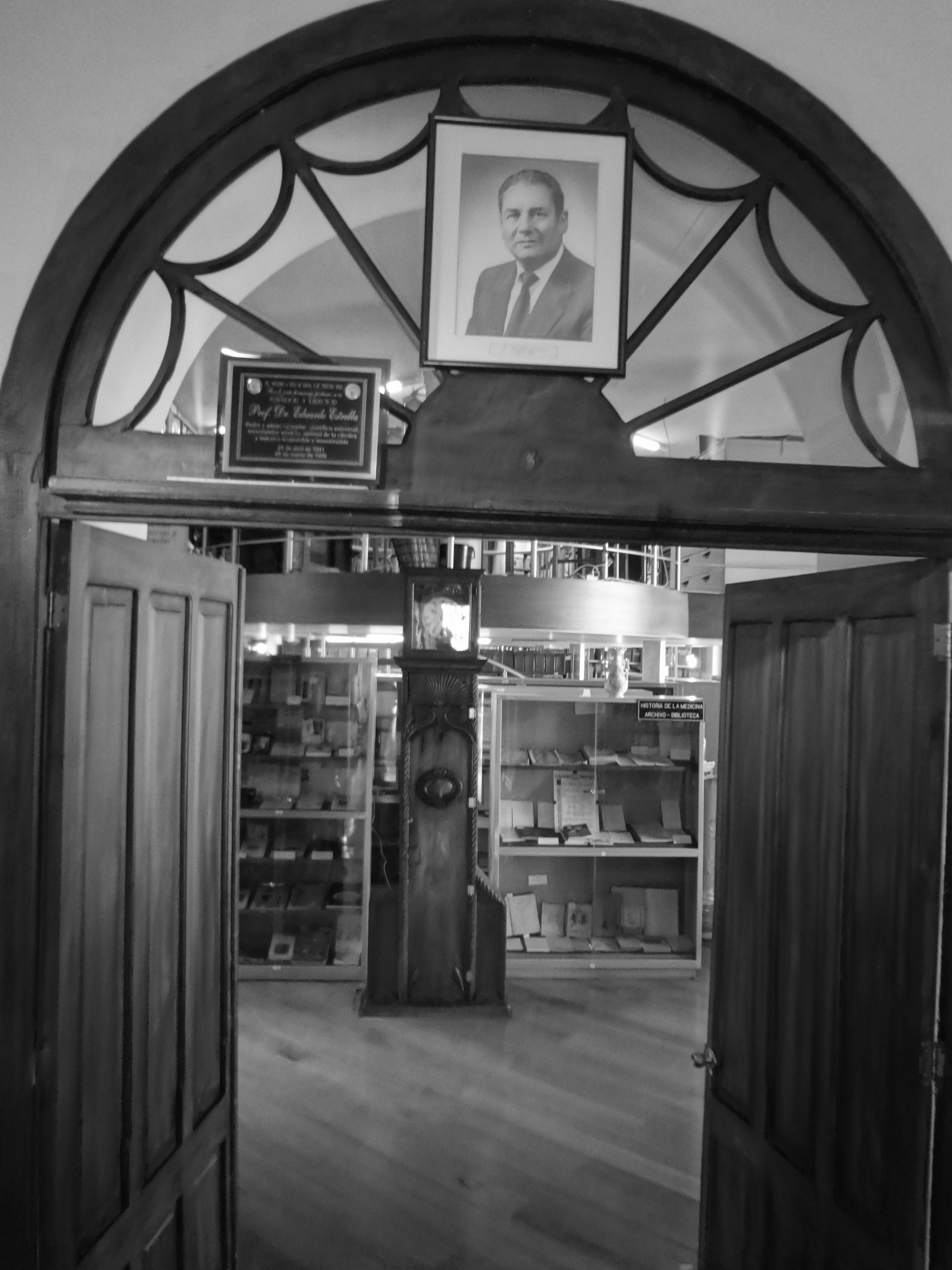
Ecuador National Museum of Medicine (interior) Picture of the founder Dr. Eduardo Estrella.

== See also ==
- Museums in Quito
