= Salvador Rizo =

Salvador Rizo Blanco
- Born: ca. 1762; Santa Cruz de Mompox, Viceroyalty of New Granada, Spanish Empire
- Died: 12 February 1816; Bogotá, Viceroyalty of New Granada, Spanish Empire
- Known for: Royal Botanical Expedition to New Granada and as member of the patriot army
- Scientific career
- Fields: Botany, Painting

Salvador Rizo Blanco (Santa Cruz de Mompox, Viceroyalty of New Granada, ca. 1762 – Bogotá, Viceroyalty of New Granada, 1816) was a botanist and painter who was a person very important during the Royal Botanical Expedition to New Granada which classified plants and wildlife.

== Biography ==
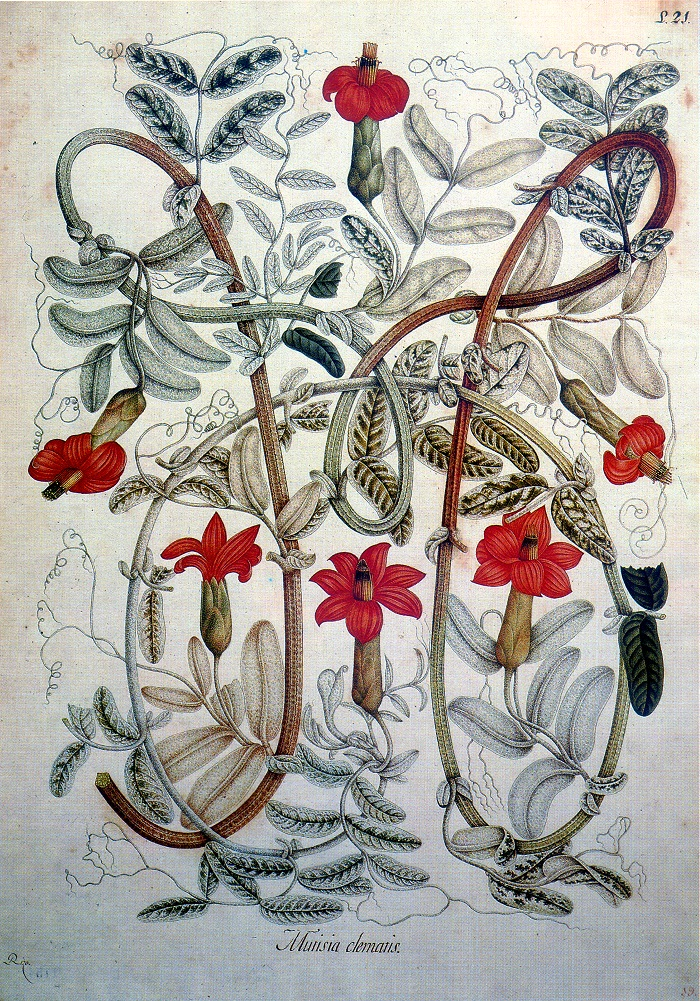
Mutisia clematis painted by Salvador Rizo during the Royal Botanical Expedition to New Granada

Salvador Rizo was employed as draftsman with an engineer of roads when met to José Celestino Mutis in Bogotá in 1784. Mutis defined to Rizo as an anvil for the work. In the Royal Botanical Expedition to New Granada Rizo was named "first painter" and also he was commissioned of the Administration and Finance of the expedition. He directed the school of painting of the expedition. Among the illustrations preserved of the expedition there are 158 signed by Salvador Rizo, more others many not signed.

Salvador Rizo assumed the leadership of the expedition to the death of Mutis in 1808, but resigned in 1811 due to conflicts with other members of it. Rizo decided to enlist in the ranks of the patriot army and was executed during the repression by the Spanish.

Science has honored his name giving him a genus of plants called "Rizoa".

== See also ==
- Royal Botanical Expedition to New Granada
- José Celestino Mutis
