= Stevia crenata =

Conservation status
- Vulnerable (IUCN 3.1)

Scientific classification
- Kingdom: Plantae
- Clade: Tracheophytes
- Clade: Angiosperms
- Clade: Eudicots
- Clade: Asterids
- Order: Asterales
- Family: Asteraceae
- Genus: Stevia
- Species: S. crenata

Binomial name
- Stevia crenata Benth.

Species of flowering plant

Stevia crenata is a species of flowering plant in the family Asteraceae. It is found only in Ecuador. Its natural habitat is subtropical or tropical moist montane forests. It is threatened by habitat loss.
