= Flora Huayaquilensis =

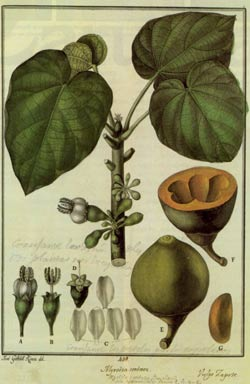
A page from Flora Huayaquilensis depicting plant life in South America. After almost 200 years, Flora Huayaquilensis was discovered in the archives of the Royal Botanical Gardens in Madrid, Spain, by Dr. Eduardo Estrella.

Flora Huayaquilensis is the popular name for the body of work produced by botanist Juan José Tafalla Navascués while he was in South America.

Navascués made one of the first expeditions to South America with a Spaniard who documented plants of the area. His unpublished works were kept in the archives for 200 years.

In 1985, Eduardo Estrella was researching in the archives of the Royal Botanical Gardens in Madrid, Spain, when he found the documents of the "Fourth Division," for the expedition of Ruiz and Pavon in Peru and Chile. Estrella found descriptions of plants whose origins correspond to the places belonging to the Royal Audience of Quito.

The folios were numbered and contained the mysterious initials FH. Other folios that did not correspond to the flora of the Royal Court had the initials FP. The work was eventually published, credited to Navascués' expedition. The Botanical Expedition to the Viceroyalty of Peru was very similar to Navascués' expedition. Estrella founded the Ecuador National Museum of Medicine.

Not all early explorers of Ecuador had their documents survive. Theodor Wolf (February 13, 1841 - June 22, 1924) was a German naturalist who studied the Galápagos Islands during the late nineteenth century. Wolf Island (Wenman Island) is named after him. Wolf had performed a geologic survey of mainland Ecuador, but his collections were lost in storage.

== Flora Huayaquilensis ==
- Flora Huayaquilensis Juan Tafalla. (Research, Annotations and Historical Study Edition). Madrid: Institute for the Conservation of Nature (ICONA)-Royal Botanical Gardens, 1989. 2 volumes. Second Edition Guayaquil: Guayaquil Botanical Garden-Banco del Progreso, 1995.
- Flora Huayaquilensis Matriti : Editio facta ab Instituto ad Conservandam Naturam (ICONA, M.A.P.A.); et ab Horto Regio Matritense (C.S.I.C.) 1989
