= José Quer y Martínez =

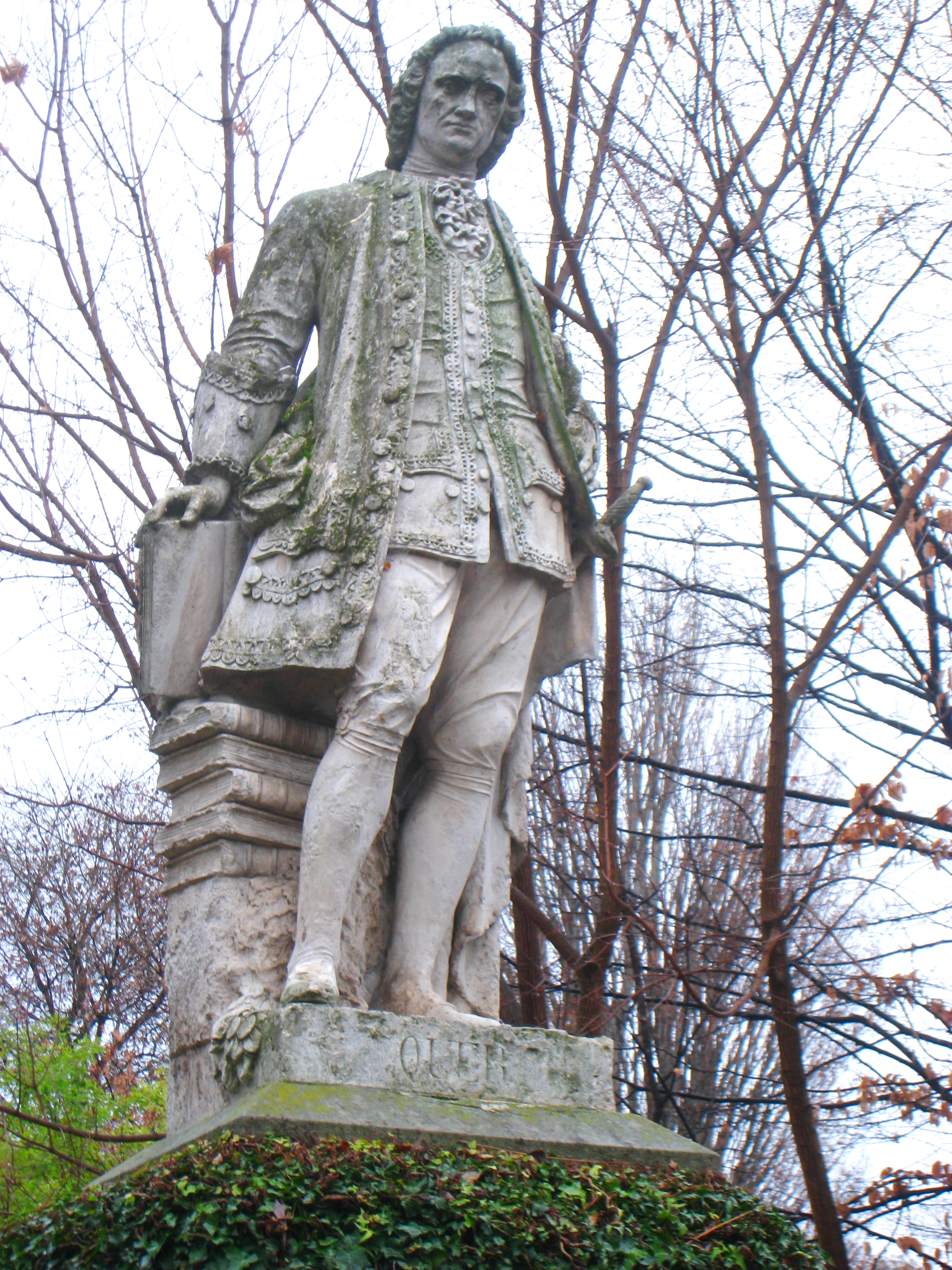
Statue of José Quer y Martínez at the Royal Botanical Garden of Madrid (Spain). Sculpted by Andrés Rodríguez (1829–?) in 1866.

José Quer y Martínez (1695–1764), was a Spanish medical doctor and botanist. This botanist is denoted by the author abbreviation Quer when citing a botanical name.

== Biography ==
Quer studied medicine and surgery in his hometown of Perpignan, where he was born in 1695, with particular emphasis on botany. He later joined the army, where. as a military surgeon, he traveled extensively in Spain, France, Italy and northern Africa (where he took part in the operation to capture Oran), prepared herbarium specimens, and collected a large quantity of seeds and living plants. With these he established a botanical garden in 1755 which has evolved into today's Real Jardín Botánico de Madrid.

In 1762 he launched the publication of his Spanish Flora and history of the plants that are grown in Spain, (which led him to correspond with Carl Linnaeus). He published only four volumes of this work before his death. It was completed one of his successors, Casimiro Gomez Ortega. Quer published two lectures, one on the "Uva ursi or gayuba" (1763) and the other on the "Cicuta" (1764).

== Links ==
- Josep Quer i Martínez | Galeria de Metges Catalans in Catalan
