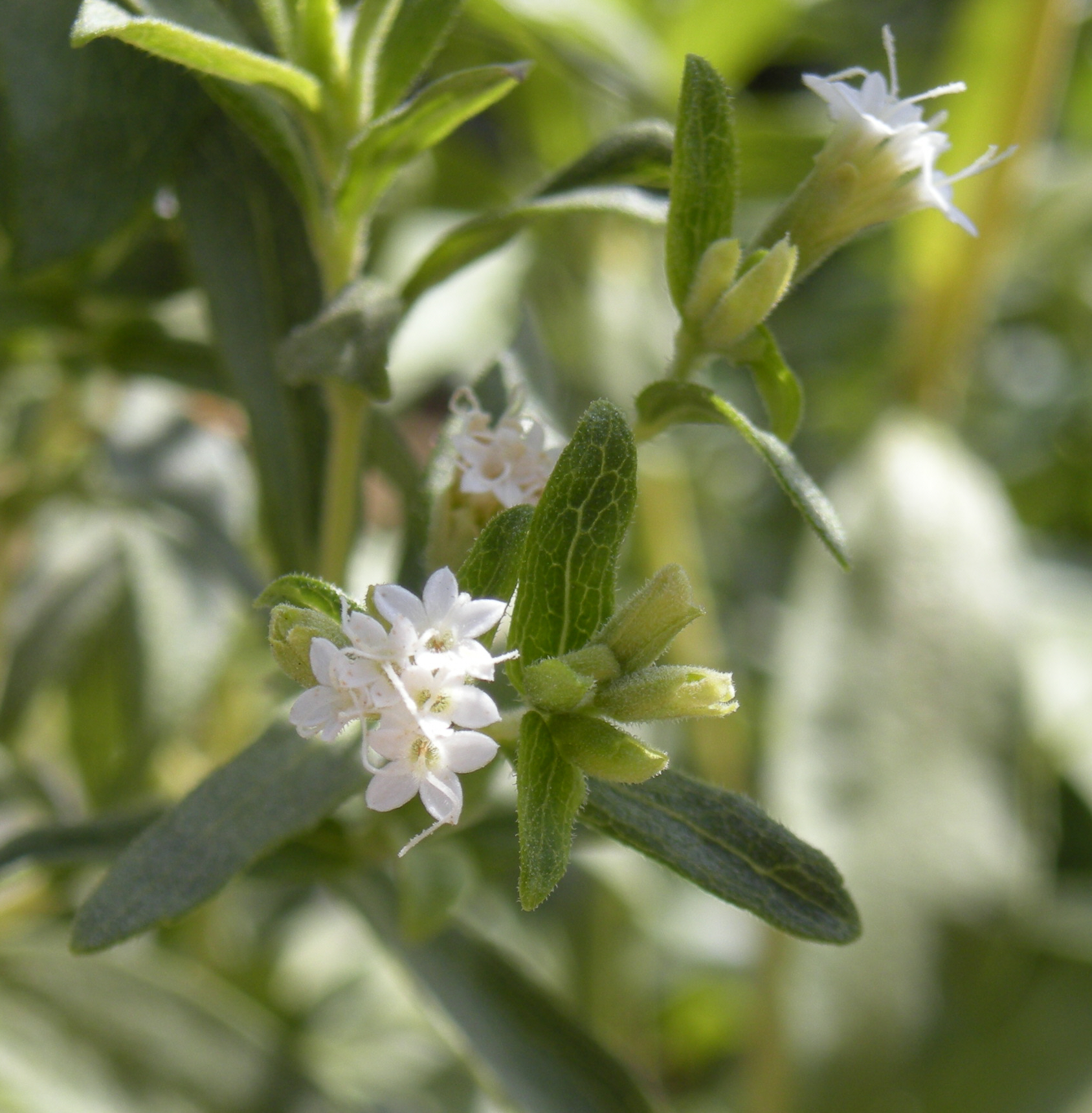
- Stevia rebaudiana flowers

Scientific classification
- Kingdom: Plantae
- Clade: Embryophytes
- Clade: Tracheophytes
- Clade: Angiosperms
- Clade: Eudicots
- Clade: Asterids
- Order: Asterales
- Family: Asteraceae
- Subfamily: Asteroideae
- Tribe: Eupatorieae
- Genus: Stevia; Cav.

Species
- About 240 species, including: Stevia anisostemma; Stevia bertholdii; Stevia crenata; Stevia dianthoidea; Stevia enigmatica; Stevia eupatoria; Stevia lemmonii; Stevia micrantha; Stevia ovata; Stevia plummerae; Stevia rebaudiana; Stevia salicifolia; Stevia serrata; Stevia tunguraguensis; Stevia viscida

Synonyms
- Nothites Cass.; Mustelia Spreng.

= Stevia (genus) =

Family of shrubs

Stevia (/ˈstiːviə, ˈstɛviə/) is a genus of about 240 species of herbs and shrubs in the family Asteraceae, native to subtropical and tropical regions from western North America to South America. The species Stevia rebaudiana in this genus is widely grown for its extraction of sweet compounds from its leaves and sold as a sugar substitute known as stevia and other trade names.

== Taxonomy ==
The genus Stevia consists of 240 species.

The genus was named after Spanish botanist and physician Petrus Jacobus Stevus (Pedro Jaime Esteve 1500–1556), a professor of botany at the University of Valencia.

== Distribution and habitat ==
The genus is native to South America, Central America, and Mexico, with several species found as far north as Arizona, New Mexico, and Texas. The genus primarily grows in semi-dry mountainous terrains but can also grow in other habitats such as grasslands, scrublands, forested mountain slopes, conifer forests, and subalpine vegetation.

== Uses ==
Human use of the sweet species S. rebaudiana originated in South America. The species Stevia rebaudiana is widely grown for the sweet compounds (steviol glycosides) extracted from its leaves, sold as a sugar substitute under the generic name stevia and several trade names.
