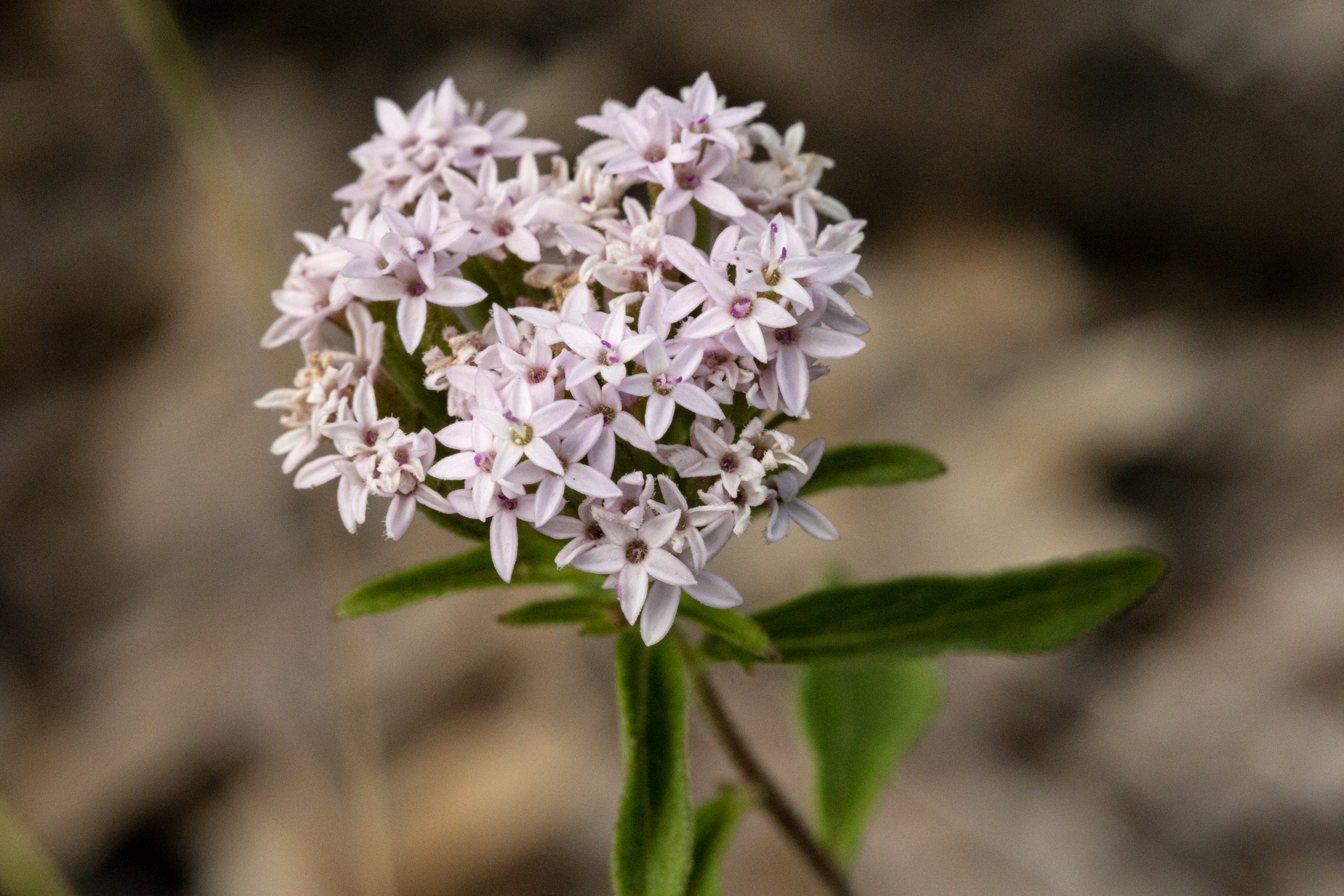
- Stevia plummerae

Scientific classification
- Kingdom: Plantae
- Clade: Tracheophytes
- Clade: Angiosperms
- Clade: Eudicots
- Clade: Asterids
- Order: Asterales
- Family: Asteraceae
- Genus: Stevia
- Species: S. plummerae

Binomial name
- Stevia plummerae A. Gray

= Stevia plummerae =

Species of herb

Stevia plummerae, or Plummer's candyleaf, is a plant species known from Arizona, New Mexico, Chihuahua, Sonora and Durango. It is an herb up to 80 cm tall, with white, pink or red flowers. Leaves are opposite in arrangement with coarsely serrated margins. It tends to grow in pine forests at an elevation of 2,000–3,000 m (6,600–9,800 ft).

== Synonyms ==
- Stevia plummerae A. Gray, Proc. Amer. Acad. Arts 17: 204–205. 1882.
  - Stevia madrensis A. Gray, Proc. Amer. Acad. Arts 21: 382. 1886.
  - Stevia plummerae var. durangensis B.L. Rob, Proc. Amer. Acad. Arts 43(2): 29. 1907.

Two varieties are recognized in addition to the autonym, var. plummerae:

- Stevia plummerae var. alba A. Gray, Syn. Fl. N. Amer. 1(2): 92. 1884.
- Stevia plummerae var. durangensis B.L. Rob., Proc. Amer. Acad. Arts 43(2): 29. 1907
