= Anales del Jardín Botánico de Madrid =

- Publisher: Real Jardín Botánico de Madrid
- Founded: 1941
- Country: Spain
- Language: Spanish
- Website: rjb.revistas.csic.es/index.php/rjb
- ISSN: 0211-1322

The Annals of the Botanical Garden of Madrid (Spanish: Anales del Jardín Botánico de Madrid, abbreviation Anales Jard. Bot. Madrid) is a Spanish publication specialized in botany.

== See also ==
- Real Jardín Botánico de Madrid
- Open access in Spain
