= Pedro Jaime Esteve =

Spanish doctor, botanist, and humanist

Pedro Jaime Esteve (latinicized: Estevius, Catalan: Pere Jaume Esteve; c. 1500 in Sant Mateu del Maestrat – 1556 in Valencia) was a Spanish medical doctor, botanist, and humanist.

== Life and work ==
Pedro Jaime Esteve studied in Valencia, Paris, and Montpellier. Later, he worked as a professor of medicine and mathematics at the University of Valencia. In 1551, he published the Hippocratic work "Epidemics II" in Greek, with numerous illustrations and a Latin translation. This book was the medical foundation of humanism in Spain. In 1552, he published a critical edition of "Theriaca", a work on the poisons and bites of snakes and scorpions, by the ancient Greek doctor Nicander of Colophon. He made his Latin hexameter version available with Latin and Catalan nomenclature and taxonomy of some plants from the region of Valencia. Later, Esteve wrote a volume on medicinal herbs, which, however, has been lost.

== Notes ==
The American plant genus Stevia is named after Pedro Jaime Esteve.

== Bibliography ==
- Helmut Genaust: Etymologisches Wörterbuch der botanischen Pflanzennamen. 3., complete edited and extended edition. Nikol, Hamburg 2005, ISBN 3-937872-16-7, S. 611 (Entry „Stevia“) (Reprint of 1996).
