= Eduardo Estrella Aguirre =

Ecuadorian doctor and researcher

Eduardo Estrella Aguirre (1941 in Tabacundo, Ecuador – 1996 in Quito) was an Ecuadorian doctor and researcher who published Flora Huayaquilensis: The Botanical Expedition of Juan Tafalla 1799-1808.

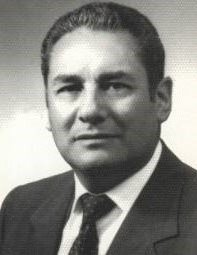
Dr. Eduadrdo Estrella

Dr. Eduardo Estrella studied medicine at the Central University of Ecuador. After graduation, Dr Estrella did his Postgraduate education on Radiotherapy at Massachusetts Institute of Technology in Cambridge, Massachusetts, United States from 1968 to 1970. He did his specialized studies in psychiatry at the University of Navarra, Pamplona from 1970 to 1973, Spain. Estrella later chaired the medical faculty at the Central University of Ecuador. Dr Estrella got his doctoral degree from the Catholic University of Quito in the 1980s. This was after he had published extensively on Andean medicine and on the history of medicine.

Dr. Eduardo Estrella founded the Ecuador National Museum of Medicine, the history of medicine museum in Quito, Ecuador - South America.

== Flora Huayaquilensis: The Botanical Expedition of Juan José Tafalla Navascués 1799-1808 ==
One of the first expeditions to South America by a Spaniard to document plants was done by Juan Tafalla whose works were lost for 200 years. Dr. Estrella was in the Archives of the Royal Botanic Gardens in Madrid Spain in 1985 where he found the documentary of the "Division IV" corresponding to the expedition of Ruiz and Pavon in Peru and Chile, Dr. Estrella found a considerable amount of descriptions of plants whose origin corresponded to places belonging to the Royal Audience of Quito.

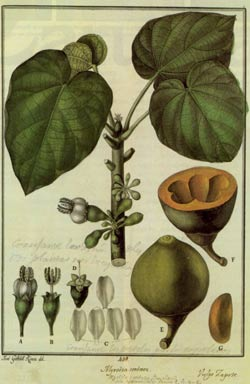
One of the pages from the book, Flora Huayaquilensis, depicting plant life in South America

The work in the Royal Botanic Gardens archive was a daunting task and took almost three years to complete. In Madrid Spain, Dr. Estrella continued his research in the Archive. The evidence mounted and was such that it was impossible to deny that at least for a few years botanist Juan Tafalla and his companions had traveled through Ecuador.

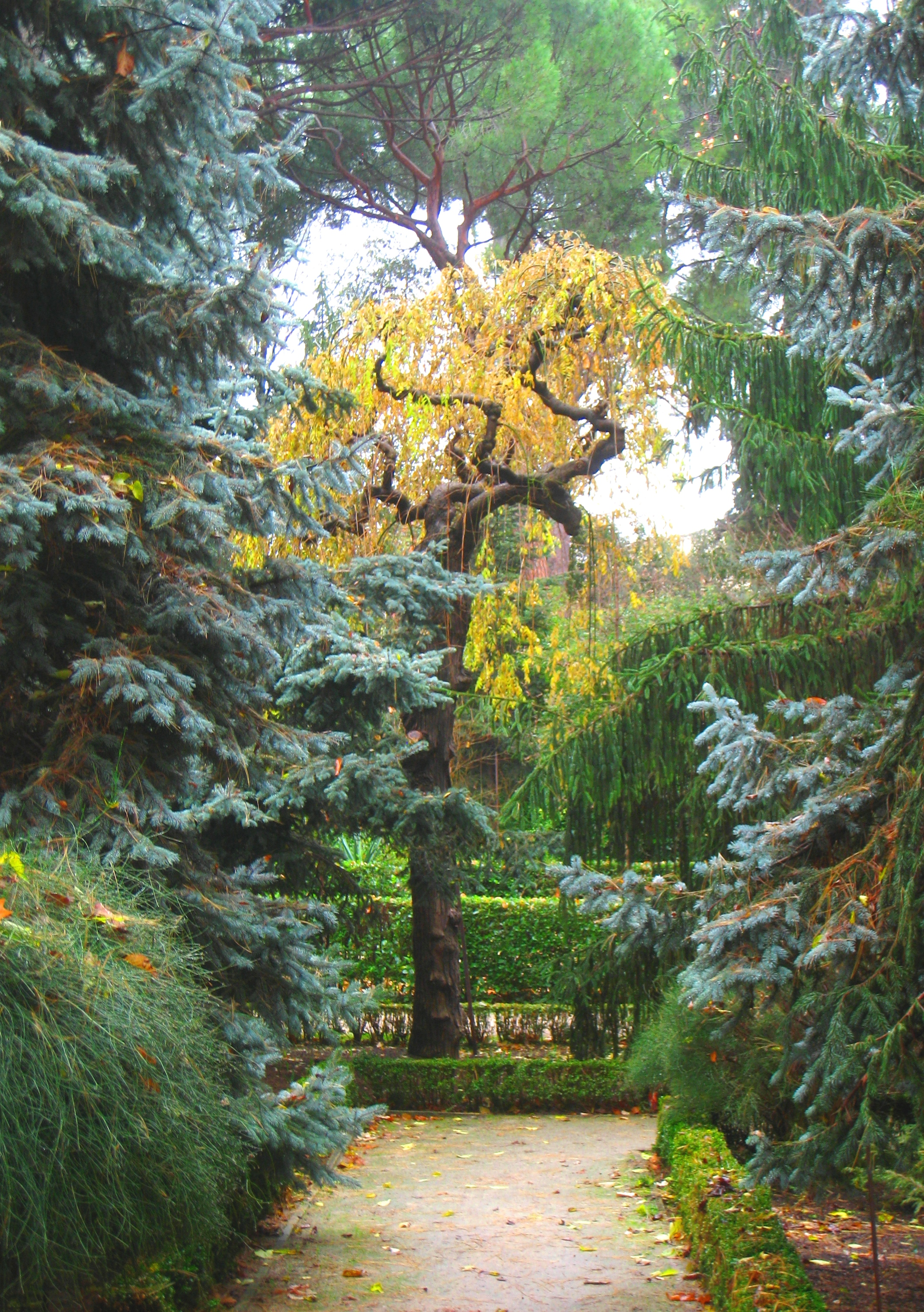
Royal Botanical Garden, Madrid

The folios were numbered and contained the mysterious initials FH and differed from others that did not correspond to the flora of the Royal Court, and had the initials FP. Still nothing was clear, but there was sufficient evidence to consider that was the trail of something important and this led to the publishing of the Flora Huayaquilensis and after 200 years, finally publishing the hard work and giving the credit to the expedition of Juan Tafalla.

== Bibliography ==
- Medicina Aborigen. Quito: Ed. Epoca, 1977. 239 p. (Reimpresión 1978) Aboriginal medicine practiced in the Ecuadorian mountains.
- Medicina y Estructura Socio-Económica. Quito: Ed. Belén, 1980. 392 p. (Reimpresión 1981) Medicine and Socio-Economic Structure.
- Estudios de Salud Mental. Quito: Ed. Belén, 1982. 230 p. Mental Health Studies
- El Pan de América. Madrid: Consejo Superior de Investigaciones Científicas (CSIC), 1986. 400 p. (II. Edición. Quito: Ed. Abya-Yala, 1988; III Edición. Quito: Ed. Abya-Yala, 1990). Bread of America: ethnohistory of the indigenous food in Ecuador.
- José Mejía: Primer Botánico Ecuatoriano. Quito: Ed. Abya-Yala, 1988. 100p. Jose Mejia, the first Ecuadorian botanist.
- Flora Huayaquilensis de Juan Tafalla. (Investigación, Estudio Histórico Anotaciones y Edición). Madrid: Instituto para la Conservación de la Naturaleza (ICONA)-Real Jardín Botánico, 1989. 2 vols. II Edición Guayaquil: Jardín Botánico de Guayaquil-Banco del Progreso, 1995. Material that was lost for 200 years and was found after three years of searching by Dr. Estrella in the Archives of the Royal Botanic Gardens, Madrid.
- De la Farmacia Galénica a la Moderna Tecnología Farmacéutica. Quito: Artes Gráficas Señal, 1990. 105 p. From Galen to the Modern Pharmacy Pharmaceutical Technology. Quito
- Función Maternal y Sexualidad. Un estudio en mujeres de una población campesina de la Provincia de Pichincha. Quito: Ed. Abya-Yala, 1991. 130 p. Maternal and sexual function. A study of women in a rural population of the province of Pichincha. Quito.
- Malaria y Leishmaniasis Cutánea en el Ecuador. Quito: Ed. Abya-Yala, 1991. 374 p. (Coauthor) Malaria and cutaneous leishmaniasis in Ecuador. Quito:
- La Biodiversidad en el Ecuador: Historia y Realidad. Quito: Tulpa Editores, 1993. 103 p. Biodiversity in Ecuador: History and Reality. Quito
- Sin Hadas; Sin Muñecos. Una Synthesis de la Situación de la Niñez en la Amazonia. Bogotá: UNICEF-UNAMAZ, 1993. 229 p.(Coautor). No fairy Without Dolls. A summary of the Situation of Children in the Amazon. Bogota: UNICEF-UNAMAZ, 1993. 229 p. (coauthor).
- Plantas Medicinales Amazónicas. Realidad y Perspectivas. Lima: Tratado de Cooperación Amazónica, 1995. 302 p. Amazonian Medicinal Plants.
- Biodiversidad y Salud en las Poblaciones Indígenas de la Amazonia. Lima: Tratado de Cooperación Amazónica, 1995. 320 p. Biodiversity and Health in Indigenous Peoples of the Amazon. Lima: Amazon Cooperation Treaty
- La Condamine. Viaje por el Río Amazonas y Estudio sobre la Quina. Barcelona (España): (Lafuente, Antonio y Estrella, Eduardo: Presentación y Edición). Ed. Alta-Fulla, 1986. (II Edición. Quito: Editorial Abya-Yala, 1994). Travel the Amazon River and Study on Quina. Barcelona (Spain): (Lafuente, Antonio Estrella, Eduardo: Introduction and Edition). Ed High-Fuller, 1986. (Second Edition. Quito: Editorial Abya-Yala, 1994)
- Guía Nacional de Servicios de Salud en el Ecuador. Quito: Ministerio de Salud-UNICEF, ILDIS, 1990. National Directory of Health Services in Ecuador. Quito: Ministry of Health, UNICEF, ILDIS
- Ruiz, Hipólito. Compendio Histórico-Médico-Comercial de las Quinas (Investigación, Introducción y Notas). Burgos (España): Caja de Ahorros Municipal, 1992. Ruiz, Hipolito. Historical Compendium of Medical Sales Quinas (Research, Introduction and Notes). Burgos (Spain) Caja de Ahorros Municipal.
- Salud y Población Indígena de la Amazonia. (Estrella, E., ed.). Quito: Crearimagen, 1993. 2 vols. Health and Indigenous People of the Amazon.
- Espejo, Eugenio. Reflexiones acerca de un método para preservar a los pueblos de viruelas. (Estudio Crítico y Edición). Quito: Comisión Permanente de Conmemoraciones Cívicas, 1993. Reflections on a method to preserve people from smallpox.
- Espejo, Eugenio. Voto de un Ministro Togado de la Audiencia de Quito. (Estudio Crítico y Edición). Quito: Comisión Permanente de Conmemoraciones Cívicas, 1993. Vote of a robed minister of the Audiencia of Quito. (Critical Study and Edition). Quito: Permanent Commission of Civic Commemorations, 1993.
- Museo Naval y Ministerio de Defensa, La Expedición Malaspina, 1789-1794, Barcelona, Lunwerg, tomos 1-9, 1987-1999. - In the book printed in 1996 Dr. Eduardo Estrella studied the history, took the notes and transcriptions from the original text and assisted in the writing - Estudio Historico, transcripcion y notas de los textos originales - Malaspina Expedition.
