= Jarilla, San Luis =

Coordinates: 33°24′S 67°02′W

Jarilla (San Luis)
- Municipality and village
- Interactive map of Jarilla (San Luis)
- Country: Argentina
- Province: San Luis Province
- Time zone: UTC−3 (ART)

Jarilla is a village and municipality in San Luis Province in central Argentina.
