= Real Jardín Botánico de Madrid =

Cultural property in Madrid, Spain

Royal Botanical Garden
- Real Jardín Botánico
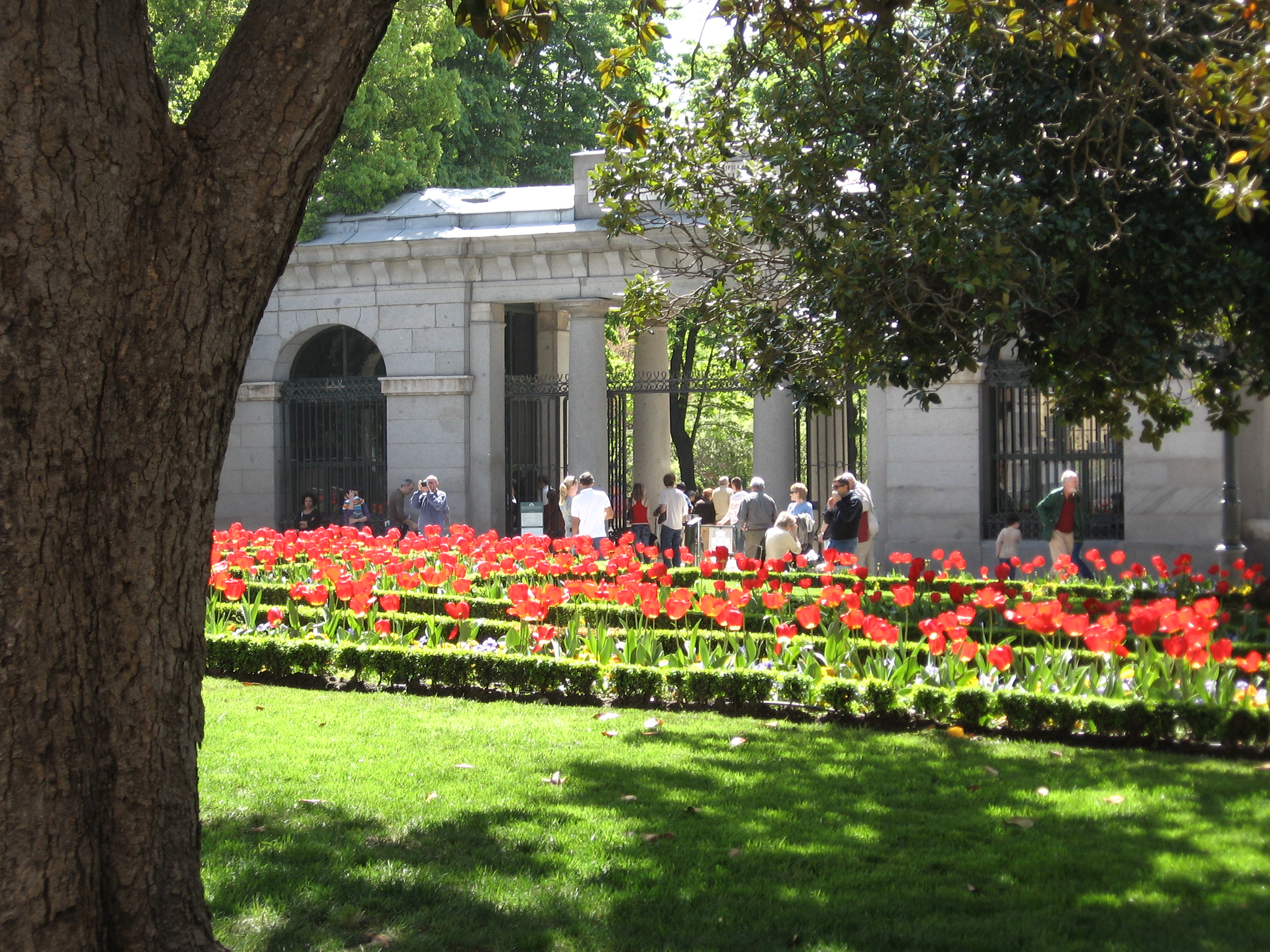
- The Murillo Gate, the entrance to the Royal Botanical Garden
- Interactive map of Royal Botanical Garden
- Type: Botanical Garden
- Coordinates: 40°24′40″N 3°41′30″W
- Area: 8 hectares (20 acres)
- Created: 17 October 1755
- Manager: Spanish National Research Council

UNESCO World Heritage Site
- Criteria: Cultural: (ii), (iv), (vi)
- Designated: 2021 (44th session)
- Part of: Paseo del Prado and Buen Retiro, a landscape of Arts and Sciences
- Reference no.: 1618
- Region: Europe and North America

Spanish Cultural Heritage
- Type: Non-movable
- Criteria: Historic Garden
- Designated: 14 October 1942
- Reference no.: RI-52-0000019

Map of the Botanical Garden

Real Jardín Botánico de Madrid (Spanish for "Royal Botanical Garden of Madrid") is an 8 hectares (20 acres) botanical garden in Madrid (Spain). The public entrance is located at Plaza de Murillo, next to the Prado Museum.

== History ==
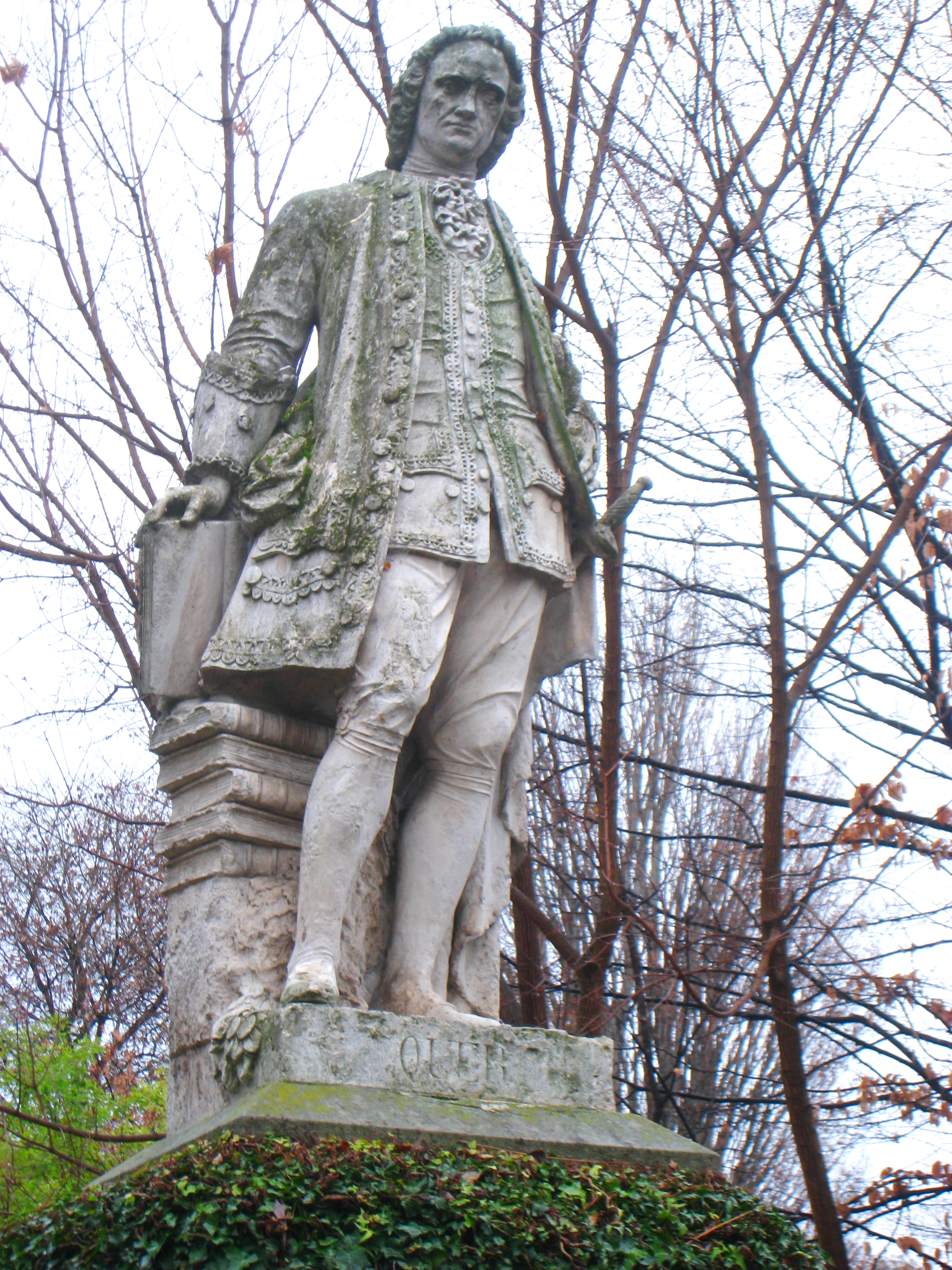
Statue of José Quer y Martínez in the gardens

The garden was founded on October 17, 1755, by King Ferdinand VI, and installed in the Orchard of Migas Calientes, near what today is called Puerta de Hierro, on the banks of the Manzanares River. It contained more than 2,000 plants collected by José Quer y Martínez, botanist and surgeon.

In 1774 King Charles III ordered the garden moved to its current location on the Paseo del Prado. This new site opened in 1781. Inside an area defined by wrought iron fencing, the design by architects Francesco Sabatini and Juan de Villanueva organized the garden into three tiered terraces, arranging plants according to the method of Linnaeus. Its mission was not only to exhibit plants, but also to teach botany, promote expeditions for the discovery of new plant species and classify them. There was a particular interest in the botany of Spain's colonial possessions. The garden was greatly augmented by a collection of 10,000 plants brought to Spain by Alessandro Malaspina in 1794.

The Spanish War of Independence in 1808 caused the garden to be abandoned, but in 1857 director Mariano de la Paz Graells y de la Agüera revived it with a new greenhouse and refurbishment of the upper terrace. Under his leadership a zoo was created in the garden, but subsequently relocated to the Parque del Buen Retiro. Between 1880 and 1890 the garden suffered heavy losses, first losing 2 hectares (4.9 acres) to the Ministry of Agriculture in 1882, then losing 564 trees in 1886 to a cyclone.

Since 1939 the garden has been dependent on the Spanish National Research Council (CSIC).

== Conservation and access ==
In 1942 the garden was given the heritage listing Artistic Garden. In 1974, after decades of hardship and neglect, the garden was closed to the public for restoration work to its original plan. It reopened in 1981. In the 21st century it became part of a World Heritage Site, "Paseo del Prado and Buen Retiro, a landscape of Arts and Sciences".

== Today's garden ==
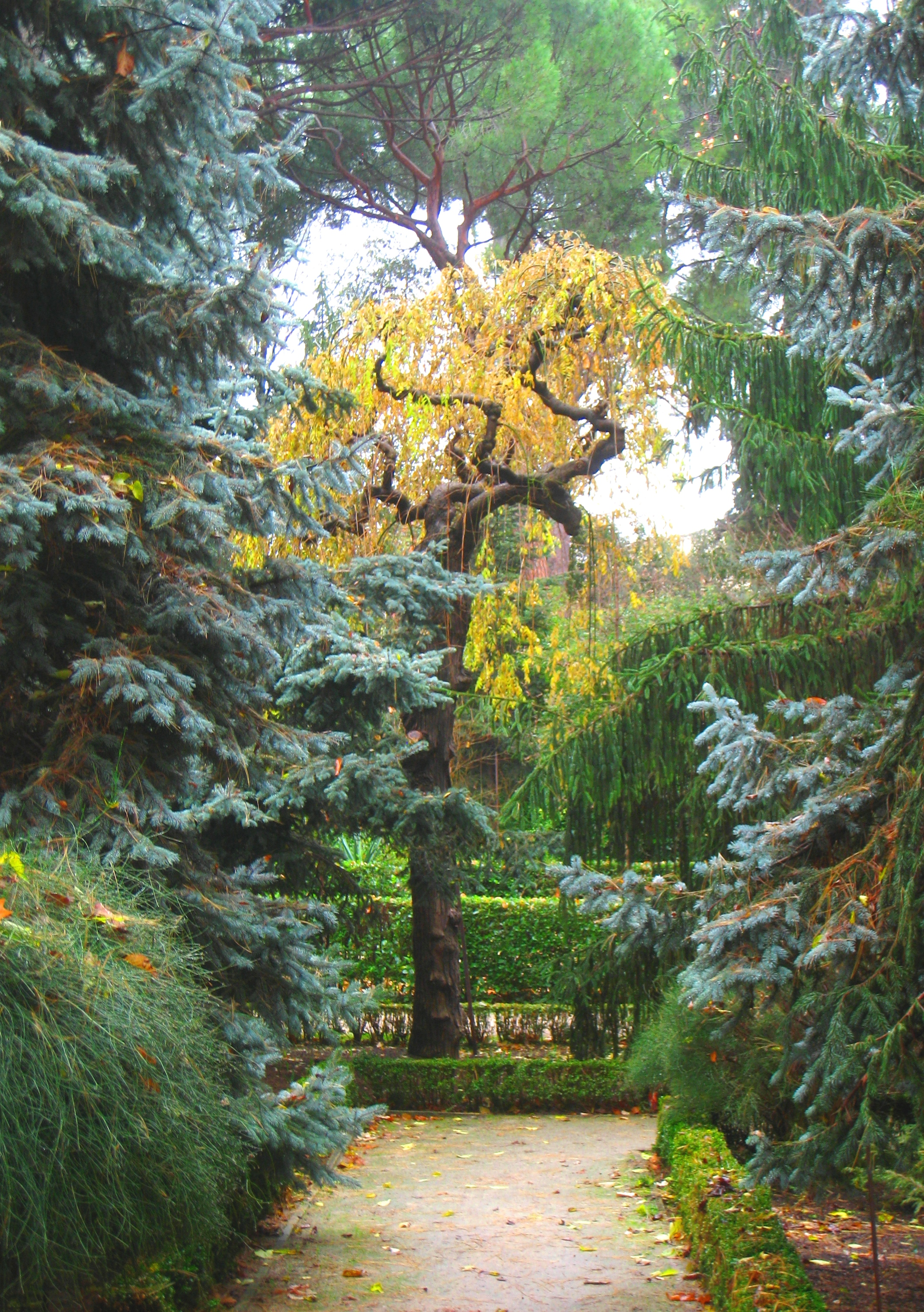
Royal Botanical Garden, Madrid

Today's garden is divided into seven major outdoor sections and five greenhouses which allow the cultivation of species which are not suited to Madrid's Continental Mediterranean climate. Total collections include about 90,000 plants and flowers, and 1,500 trees.

- Terraza de los Cuadros – collections of ornamental plants, medicinal, aromatic, endemic and orchard gathered around a small fountain. All are planted in box-edged plots. At its southwestern end is a Japanese garden.
- Terraza de las Escuelas Botánicas – a taxonomic collection of plants, ordered phylogenetically and set within plots about 12 small fountains.
- Terraza del Plano de la Flor – a diverse collection of trees and shrubs, as designed in the mid-nineteenth century in the romantic English style. It contains the Villanueva Pavilion, built in 1781 as a greenhouse, and a pond with bust of Carl Linnaeus.

The garden's two greenhouses are divided into four rooms. The Graëlls greenhouse dates from the nineteenth century and exhibits tropical plants and bryophytes. The newer structure supports three climates: tropical, temperate, and desert.

=== Herbarium ===
The herbarium is the largest in Spain and now contains over a million specimens from around the world. The oldest material consists of plants collected during scientific expeditions undertaken in the 18th and 19th centuries.

As of 2016, the online herbarium's databases contained detailed information about all the specimens in the algae, bryophyte, lichen and fungi collections.

== Scientific publications ==
- Annals of the Botanical Garden of Madrid: this is the magazine published by the Botanical Garden, which publishes papers on plant taxonomy and systematics and fungi and related fields such as biogeography, bioinformatics, conservation, ecophysiology, phylogeny, phylogeography, floral, functional morphology, nomenclature or plant relationships -animal, including works of synthesis and review. The magazine sends information about the new species published to be included in the databases W3TROPICOS (vascular plants, bryophytes), International Plant Names Index or Index Fungorum.
- Flora Iberica: publication of taxonomic research on vascular plants that grow wild in the Iberian Peninsula and Balearic Islands that was published 20 volumes of a total of 21 in 2018.
- Flora Iberica Mycologica: a serial and aperiodic publication with this generic title published, numbered consecutively, the monographic synthesis as they are being edited, without following a systematic order preset. The work is presented in two columns, with texts in Spanish and English. Bring identification keys, descriptions, distribution, commentary, and bibliographic information. Most species are accompanied by an illustration (ink drawings in black and white).
- Ruizía (Monographs of the Royal Botanical Gardens): workbooks Flora Micológica Ibérica.
- Flora Huayaquilensis is a large group of papers found by that detailed the expeditions of Juan José Tafalla Navascués, a Spaniard who was one of the first who traveled to South America and documenting the different plants with wonderful paintings and written descriptions. All of this work was in the archives and only published by Ecuadorian researcher Eduardo Estrella Aguirre after searching the Real Jardín Botánico in Madrid archives and finding the informaction that formed, Flora Huayaquilensis and finally the life work of Tafalla was published.

== Photo gallery ==
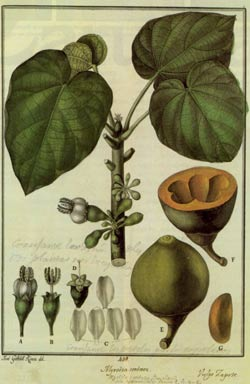
One of the pages in Flora Huayaquilensis

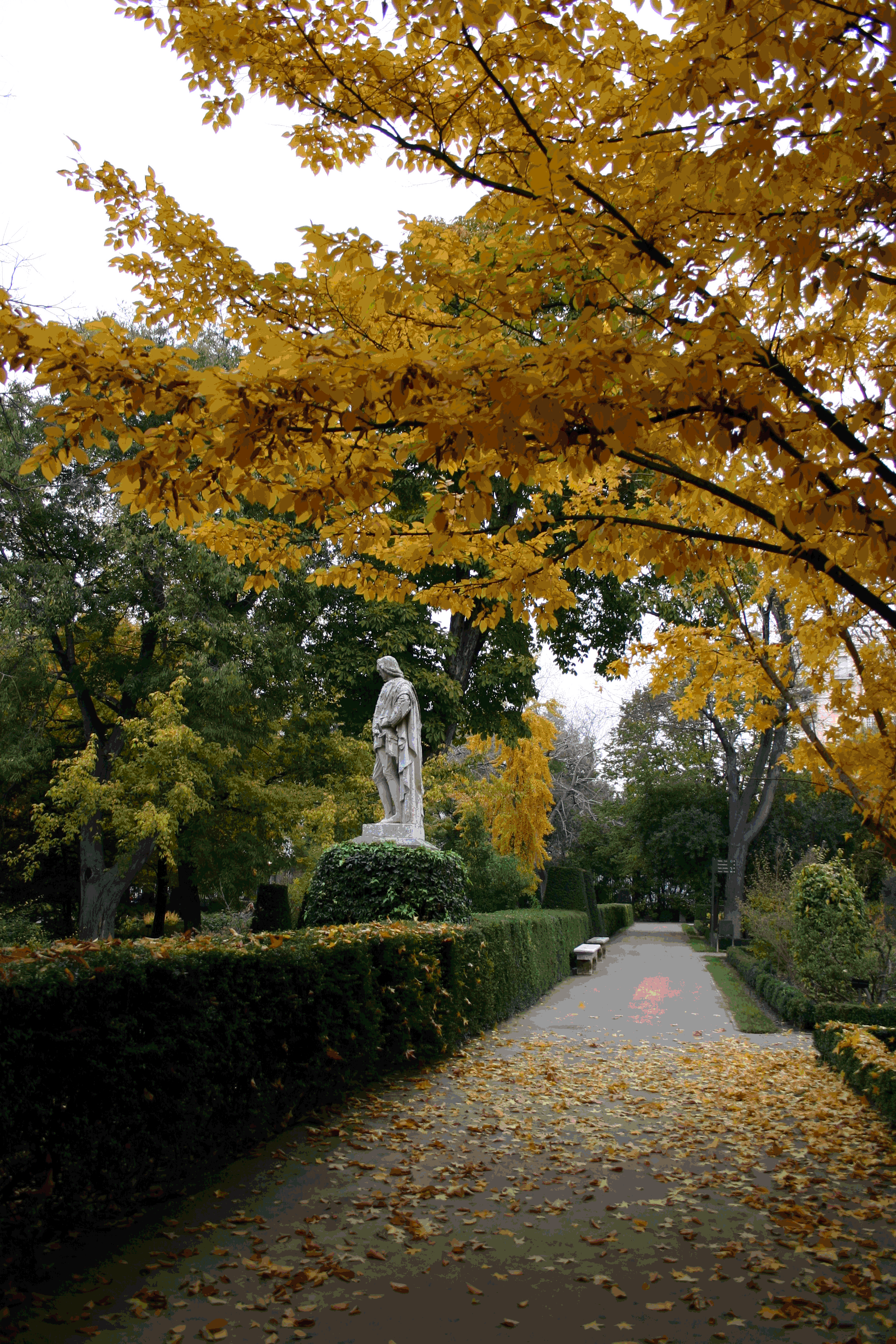

== See also ==
Enlightenment in Spain
