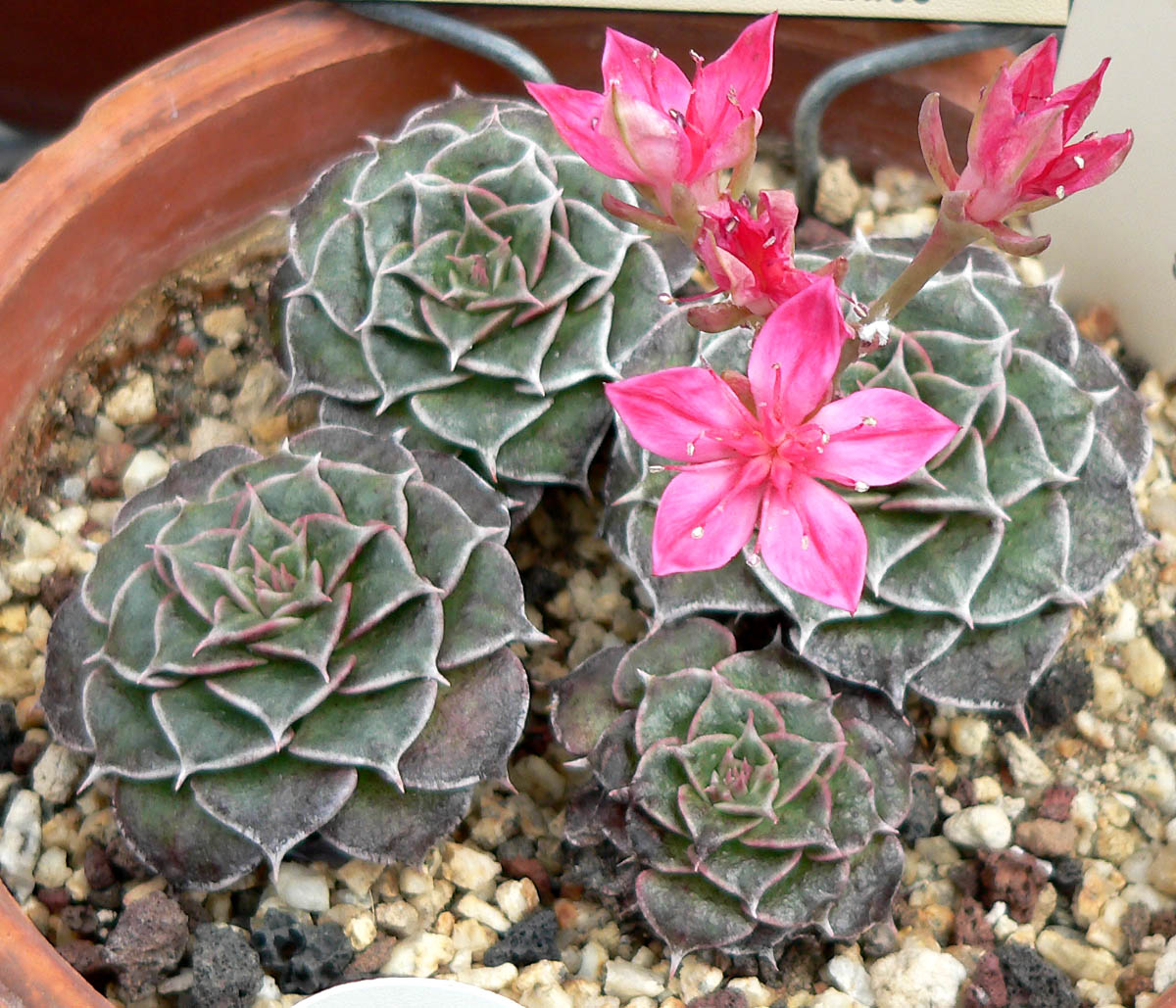

Scientific classification
- Kingdom: Plantae
- Clade: Tracheophytes
- Clade: Angiosperms
- Clade: Eudicots
- Order: Saxifragales
- Family: Crassulaceae
- Genus: Graptopetalum
- Species: G. bellum

Binomial name
- Graptopetalum bellum (Moran & J.Meyrán) D.R.Hunt

Synonyms
- Tacitus bellus Moran & J.Meyrán

= Graptopetalum bellum =

Species of succulent

Graptopetalum bellum (syn. Tacitus bellus) is a species of flowering plant in the stonecrop family Crassulaceae, native to northern Mexico. It was discovered by Alfred Lau in 1972 in the states of Chihuahua and Sonora, at an altitude of 1,460 m (4,800 ft).

It inhabits rocky terrain with moderate sun exposure.

The Latin specific epithet bellum means "beautiful".

== Description ==
Graptopetalum bellum is a succulent perennial with a slowly clustering habit. The rosettes are up to 10 cm in diameter, and almost flat to the ground. The leaves are glabrous, approximately triangular, 25 mm long, and gray or bronze in color.

Flowers appear from May to July. At the top of a 10 cm inflorescence, the flowers are over 2.5 cm, deep pink to red. The individual flowers are 5-petalled, star-shaped and have dark pink stamens and white anthers.

== Cultivation ==
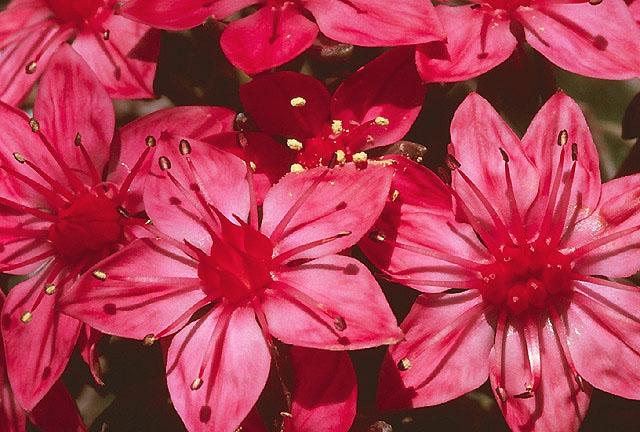
Flowers of Graptopetalum bellum

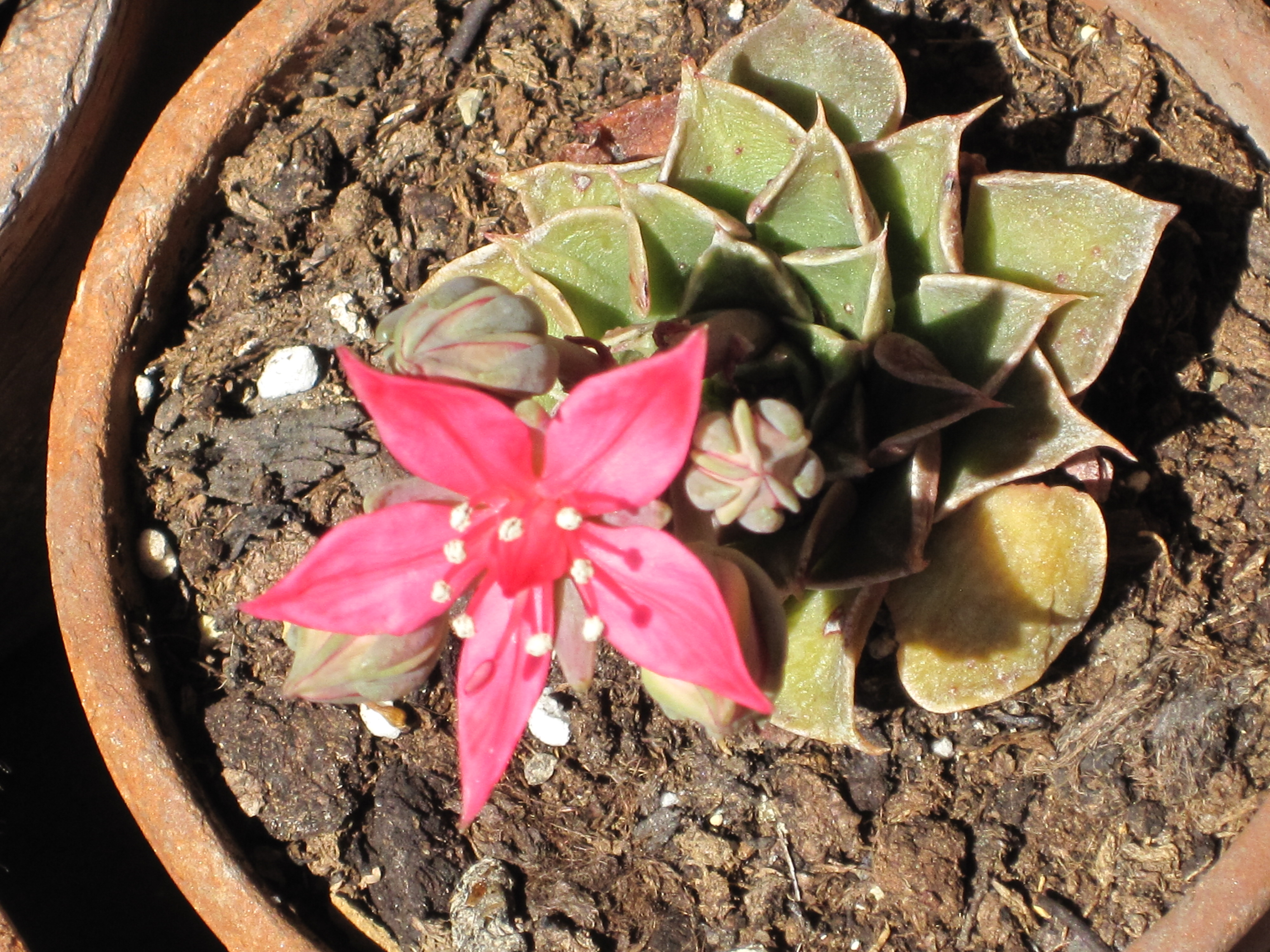
Graptopetalum bellum in pot

Graptopetalum bellum is cultivated as an ornamental plant. This species requires more shade than the others of the family, as it is found near cliffs in the wild.

It needs a soil that is light and porous with good drainage. Fertilize only during the growing season, diluted to half on the recommended rate. Use fertilizer for cactus or succulent plants.

It requires a low temperature for flowering in spring : at least one month at 15 °C (59 °F) or less. It can survive a short period at −15 °C (5 °F), if totally dry. Do not water, or only enough to avoid shrivelling. Be careful to prevent rotting, especially in winter by low temperature or humid air.

The tightly packed rosettes are attractive to mealy bugs.

The plant is propagated by division of offshoots, rooting of individual leaves and seed.

Graptopetalum bellum has gained the Royal Horticultural Society's Award of Garden Merit.
