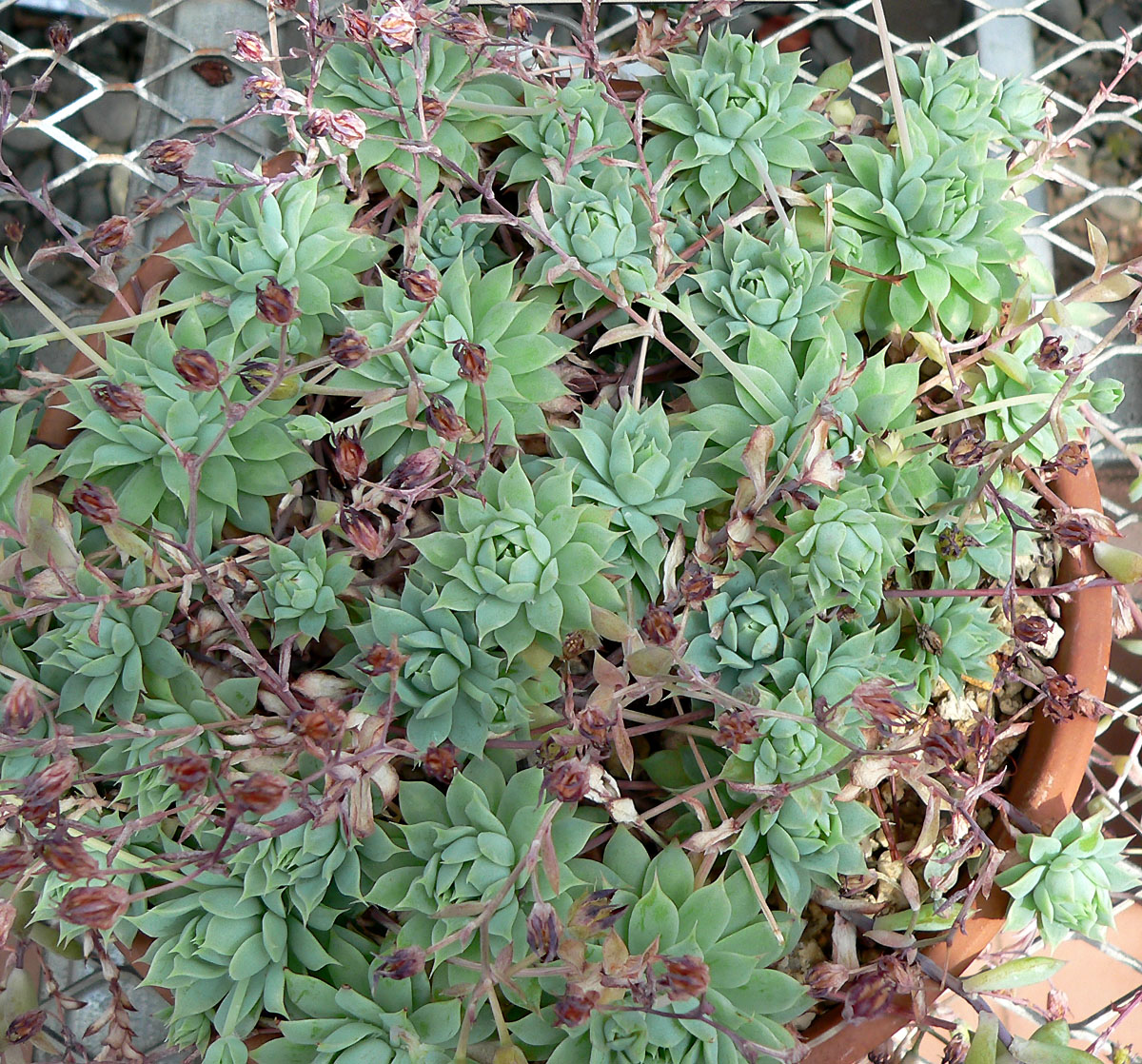
- A group of Graptopetalum macdougallii with old flowers

Scientific classification
- Kingdom: Plantae
- Clade: Tracheophytes
- Clade: Angiosperms
- Clade: Eudicots
- Order: Saxifragales
- Family: Crassulaceae
- Genus: Graptopetalum
- Species: G. macdougallii

Binomial name
- Graptopetalum macdougallii Alexander

= Graptopetalum macdougallii =

Species of succulent

Graptopetalum macdougallii is a plant belonging to the succulent genus Graptopetalum. It is native to Mexico. It grows on shady rocks, or rarely as an epiphyte, at an altitude of 1200 – 2100 meters, geographically isolated from all other Graptopetalum species.

== Description ==
Rosette plants; stems short, basally branched and in addition with axillary runners. Rosette dense, ± mat-forming. Leaves tongue-shaped, spreading during the growth season, connivent during the dry season, 2,5 – 3, 5 x 0,8 – 1,5 cm, usually ± bright bluish to greenish, apically drawn out into an up to 2 mm long elongate tip. Inflorescences 5,5 – 7 cm, thyrses ± 1,5 – 3 cm with scorpioid pendant branches with up to 10 flowers in total, pedicels to 2 cm. Flowers 5-merous, sepals basally united, obovate, acute, 6 – 8 mm, petals ovate-lanceolate, pointed, 7 – 10 mm, lower face green, tube 3 – 4 mm, inside whitish-yellow-green, basally scattered brown blotches and/or stripes, these confluent in the middle and resulting in an almost solid coloration towards the tips, apically yellowish-green, lower face with red stripes near the margins, filaments 5 – 8 mm, greenish-white apically tinged reddish.

Cytology : n = 64 – 66, 192, 244 ± 4, 245 ± 5

== Gallery ==
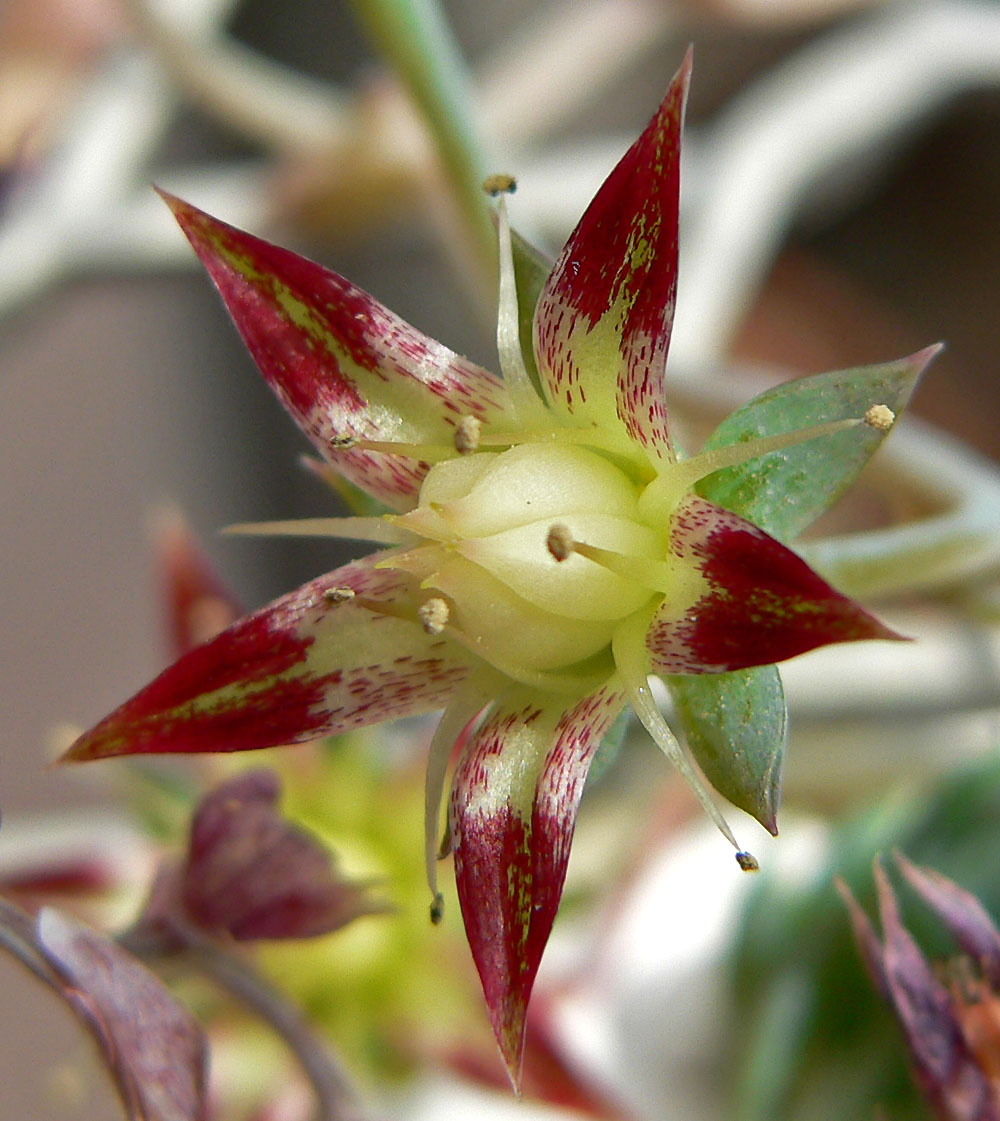
A flower of Graptopetalum macdougallii

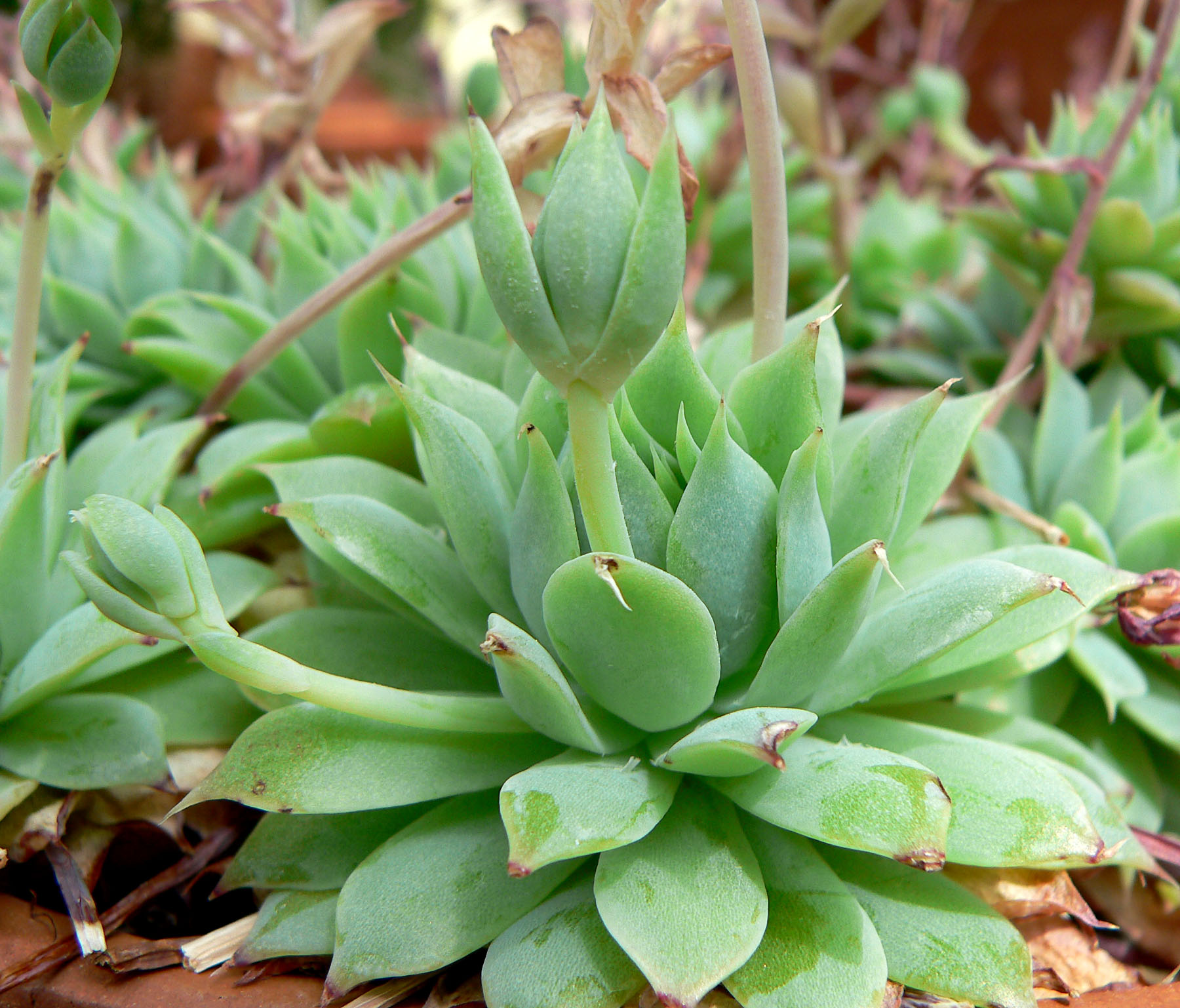
A single Graptopetalum macdougallii

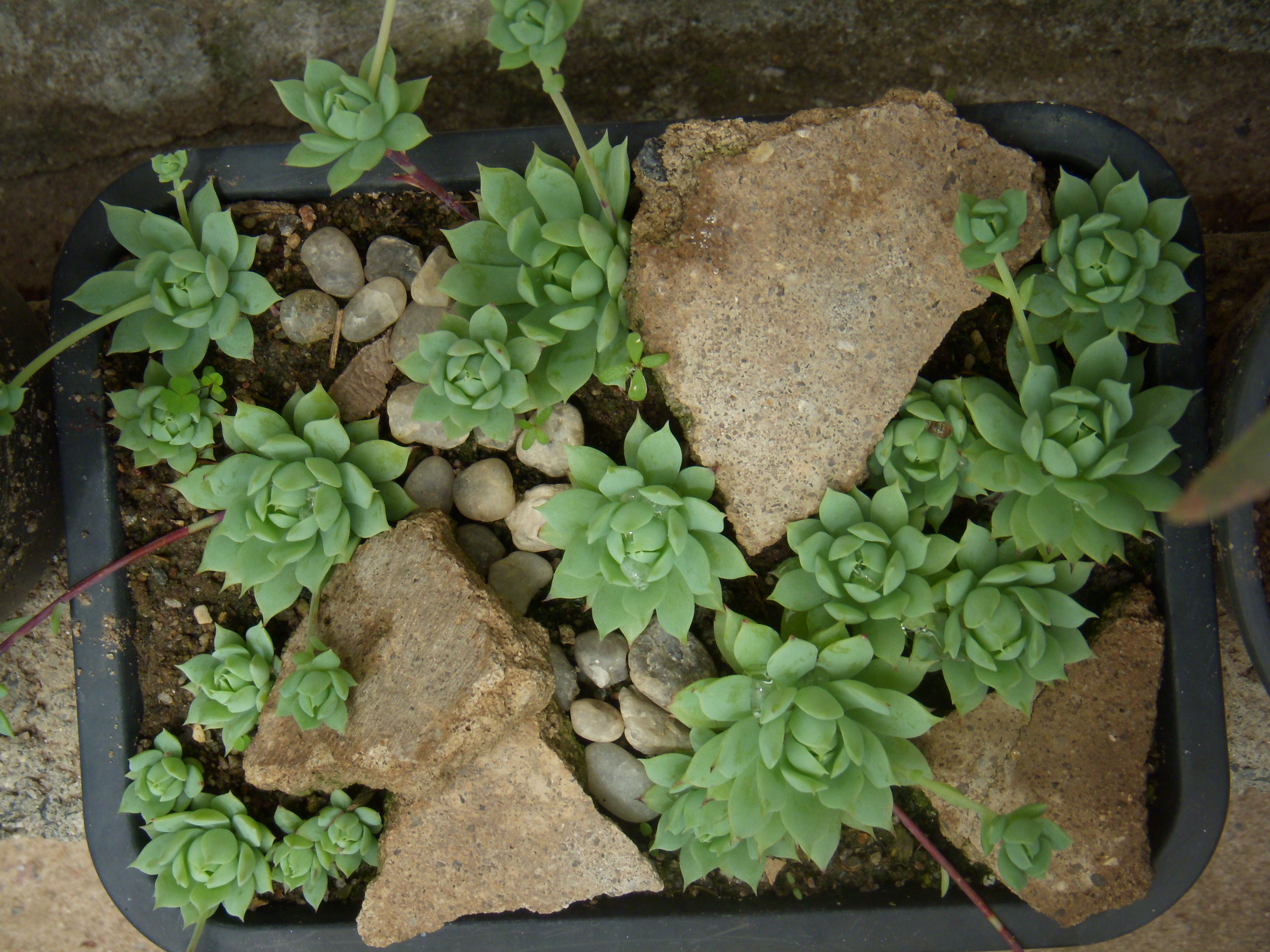

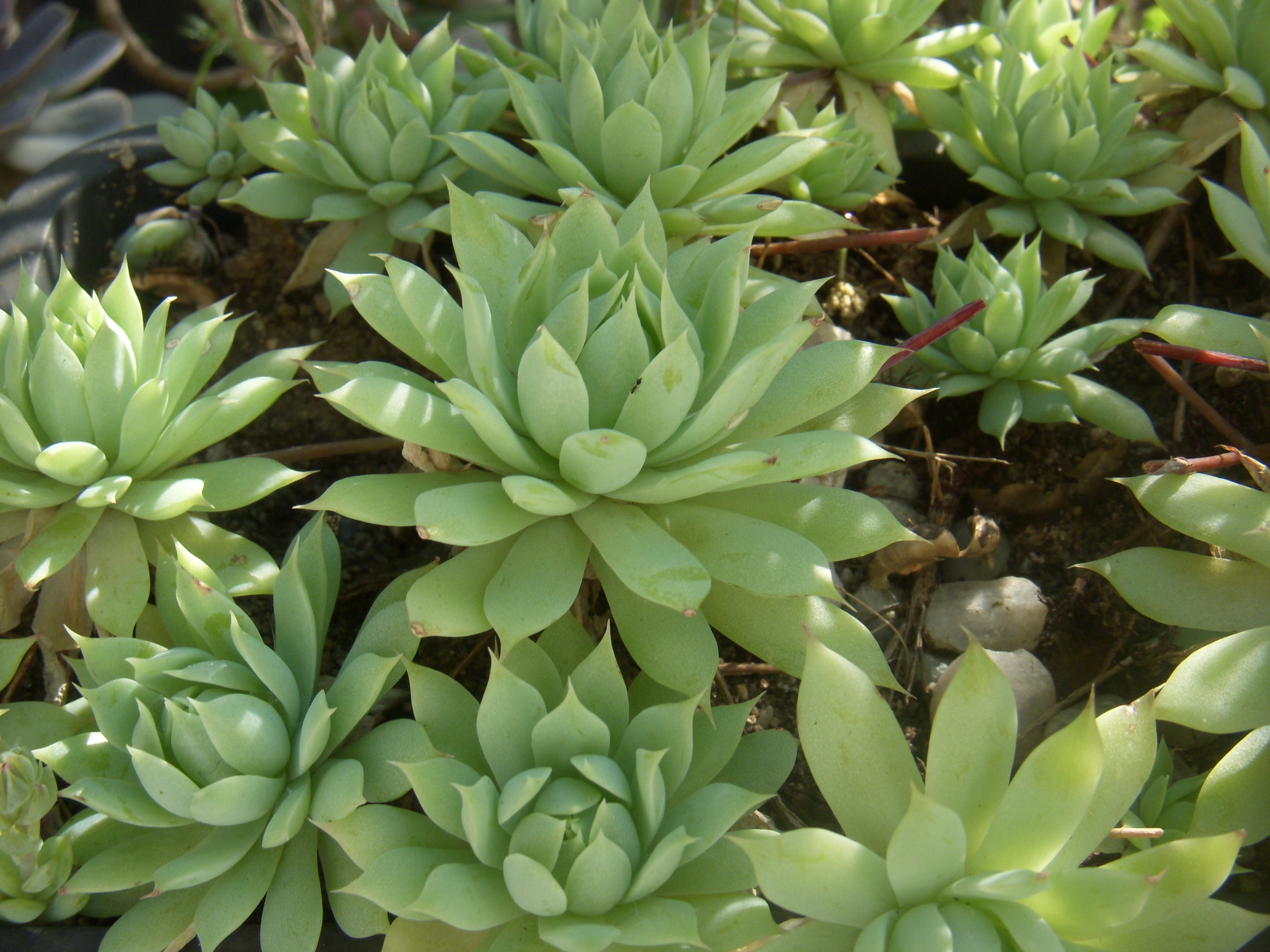

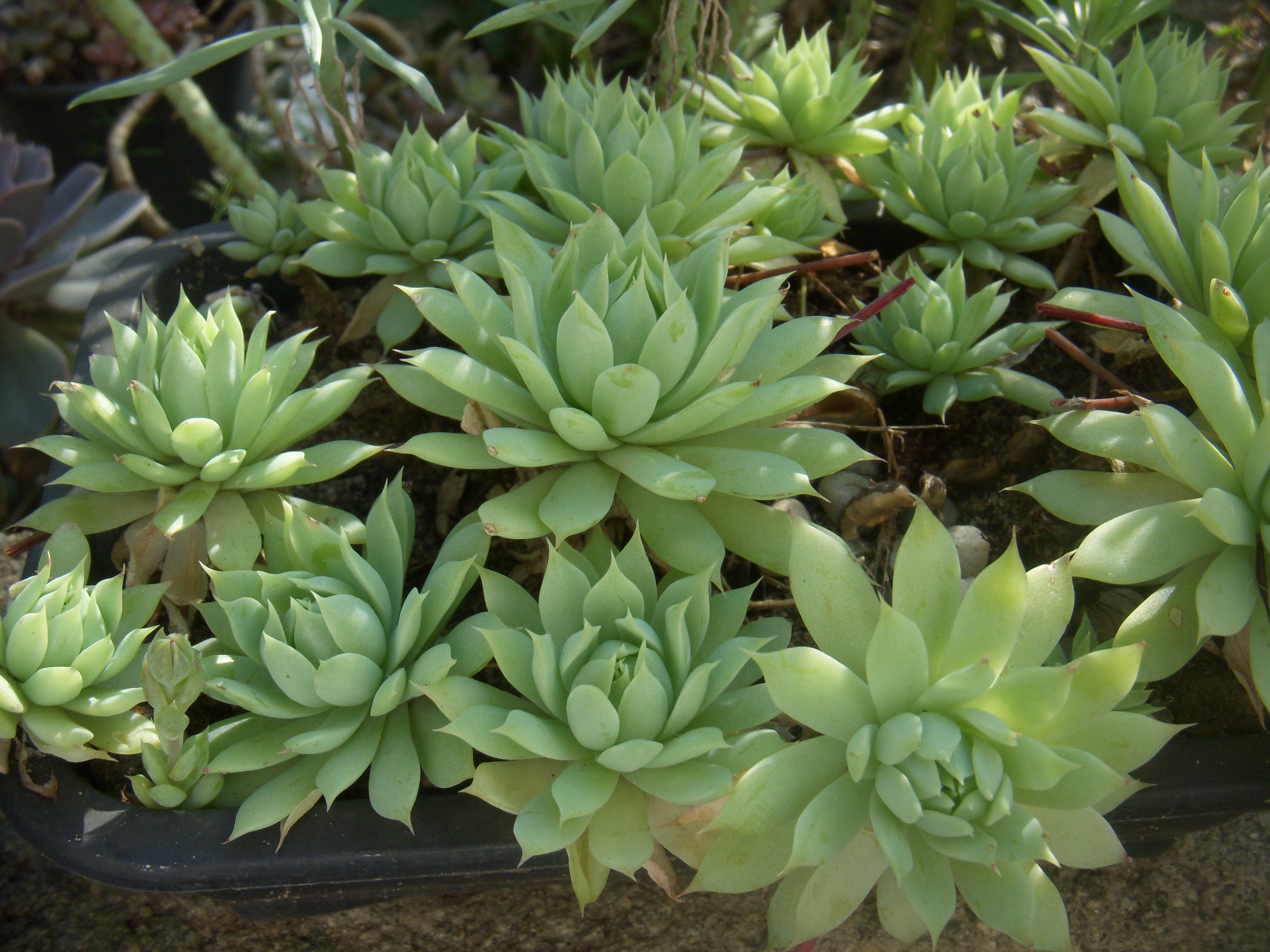
