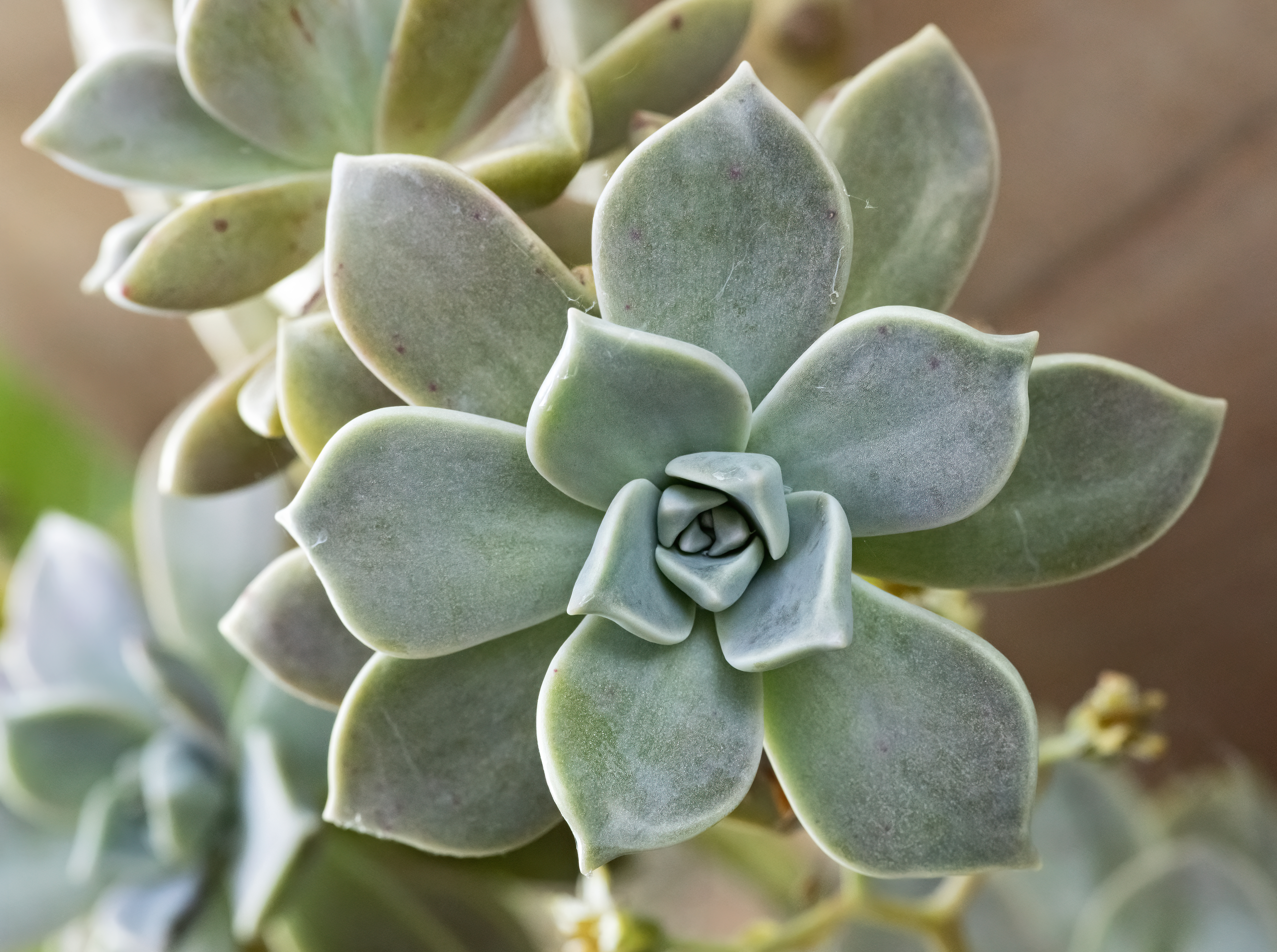

Scientific classification
- Kingdom: Plantae
- Clade: Tracheophytes
- Clade: Angiosperms
- Clade: Eudicots
- Order: Saxifragales
- Family: Crassulaceae
- Genus: Graptopetalum
- Species: G. paraguayense

Binomial name
- Graptopetalum paraguayense (N.E.Br.) E.Walther

Synonyms
- Byrnesia weinbergii (hort. ex T.B.Sheph.) Rose; Cotyledon paraguayensis N.E.Br. Echeveria weinbergii hort. ex T.B.Sheph. Sedum weinbergii (hort. ex T.B.Sheph.) A.Berger

= Graptopetalum paraguayense =

Species of succulent

Graptopetalum paraguayense is a species of succulent plant in the jade plant family, Crassulaceae, that is native to Tamaulipas, Mexico. Common names include mother-of-pearl-plant and ghost plant. This is not to be confused with Monotropa uniflora which is also referred to as the “Ghost plant”. G. paraguayense has white flowers which have a form of a star. The Graptopetalum paraguayense is called the ghost plant because of the residue on the leaves making it look like a ghost.

== Description ==
The plant has a spreading and creeping habit that reaches 20 cm high by 60 cm wide. Its appearance may vary depending on the soil and the exposure. The hanging rod can reach up to 2 m in length and a thickness of 2 cm. Green to light grey leaves can be up to 7 cm long and 3 cm wide. Thick and fleshy, they are arranged in a spiral around the stem and are very easily detached from the rosette, that is why this plant has been nicknamed "porcelain succulent".

Its flowers appearing in spring have five white petals spotted with red.

== Cultivation and uses ==
This hardy plant stands temperatures down to −10 °C. If it is sheltered from rain and too much humidity, it is easy to grow in temperate climates. It is readily propagated by cutting leaves or stems. It supports both full sun and partial shade. Watering should be avoided in the event of excessive heat. It is often used as an ornamental plant in gardens.

Plants of this species are a functional food, being used as edible vegetables. This species is also valued for its antihypertensive and hepatoprotective activities in traditional Taiwanese and Chinese medicine.

== Gallery ==
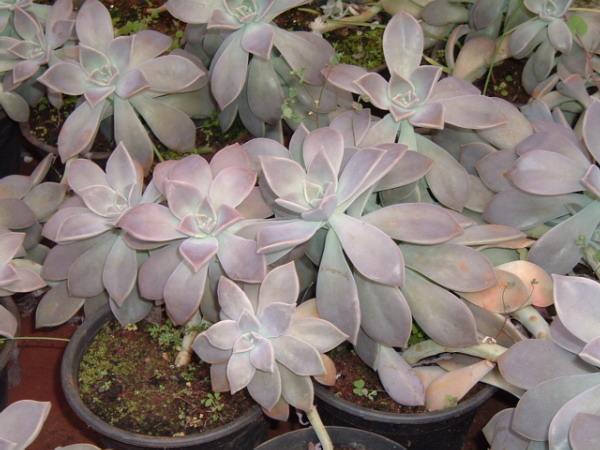
Potted plants

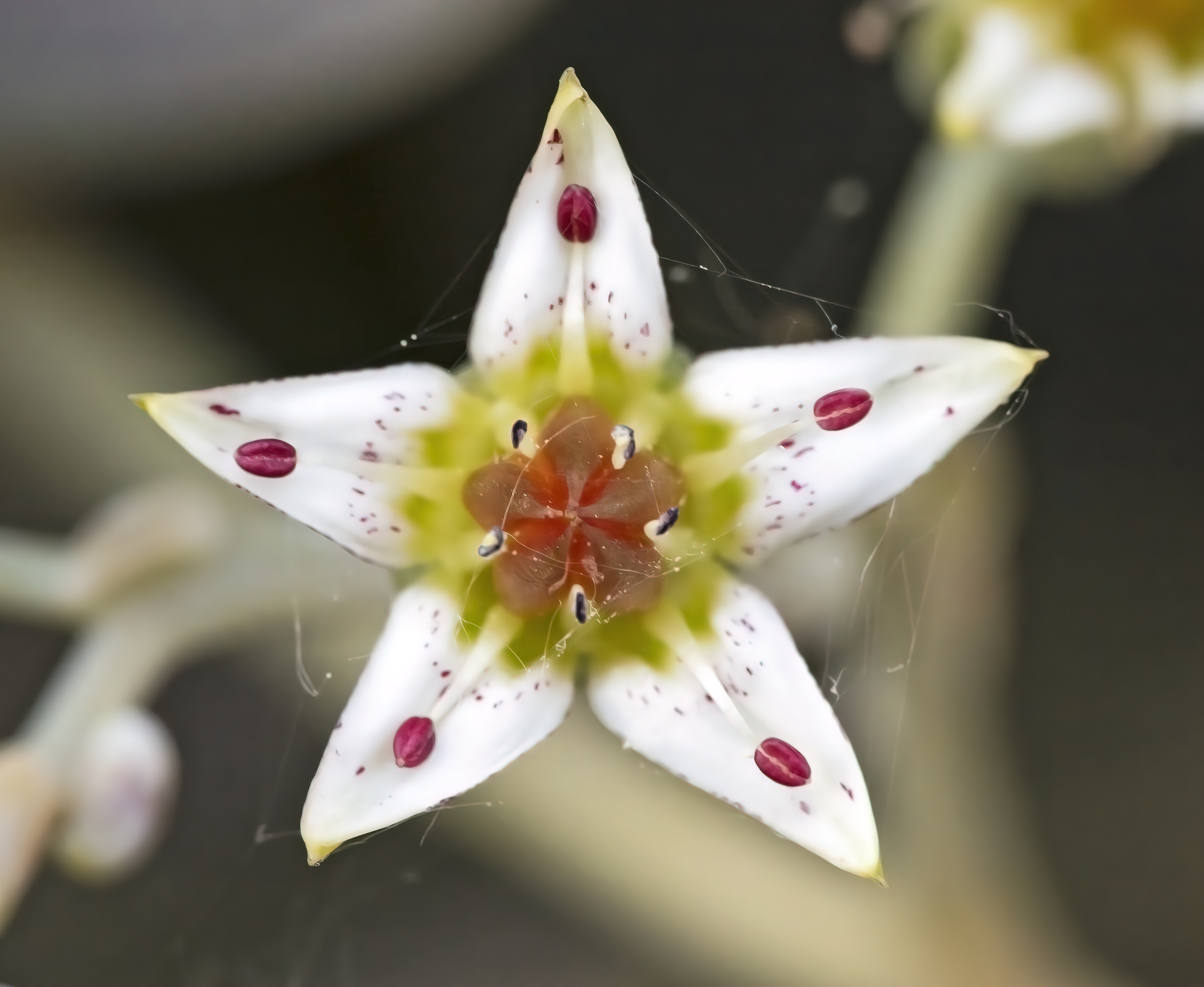
Flowers

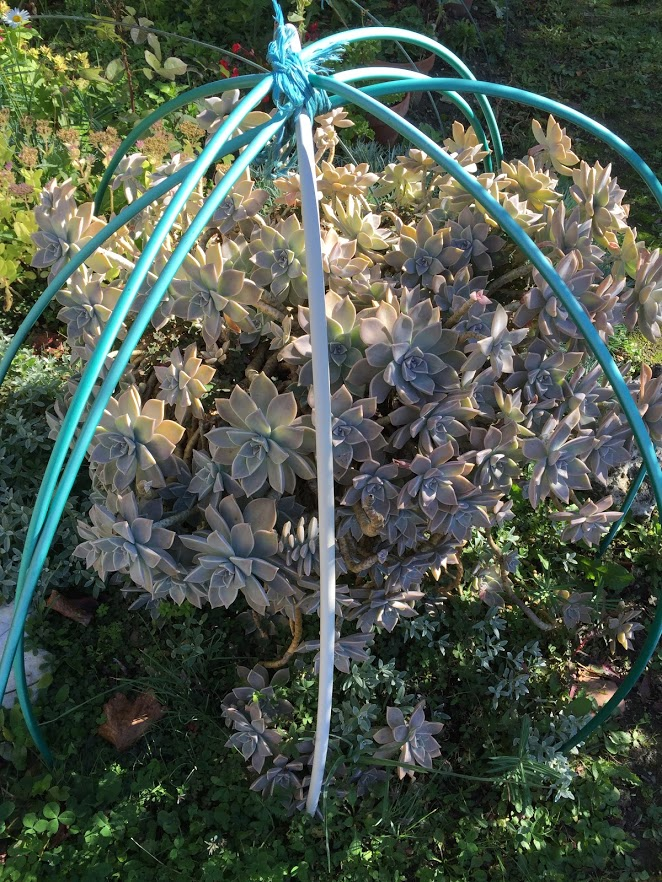
In a clump

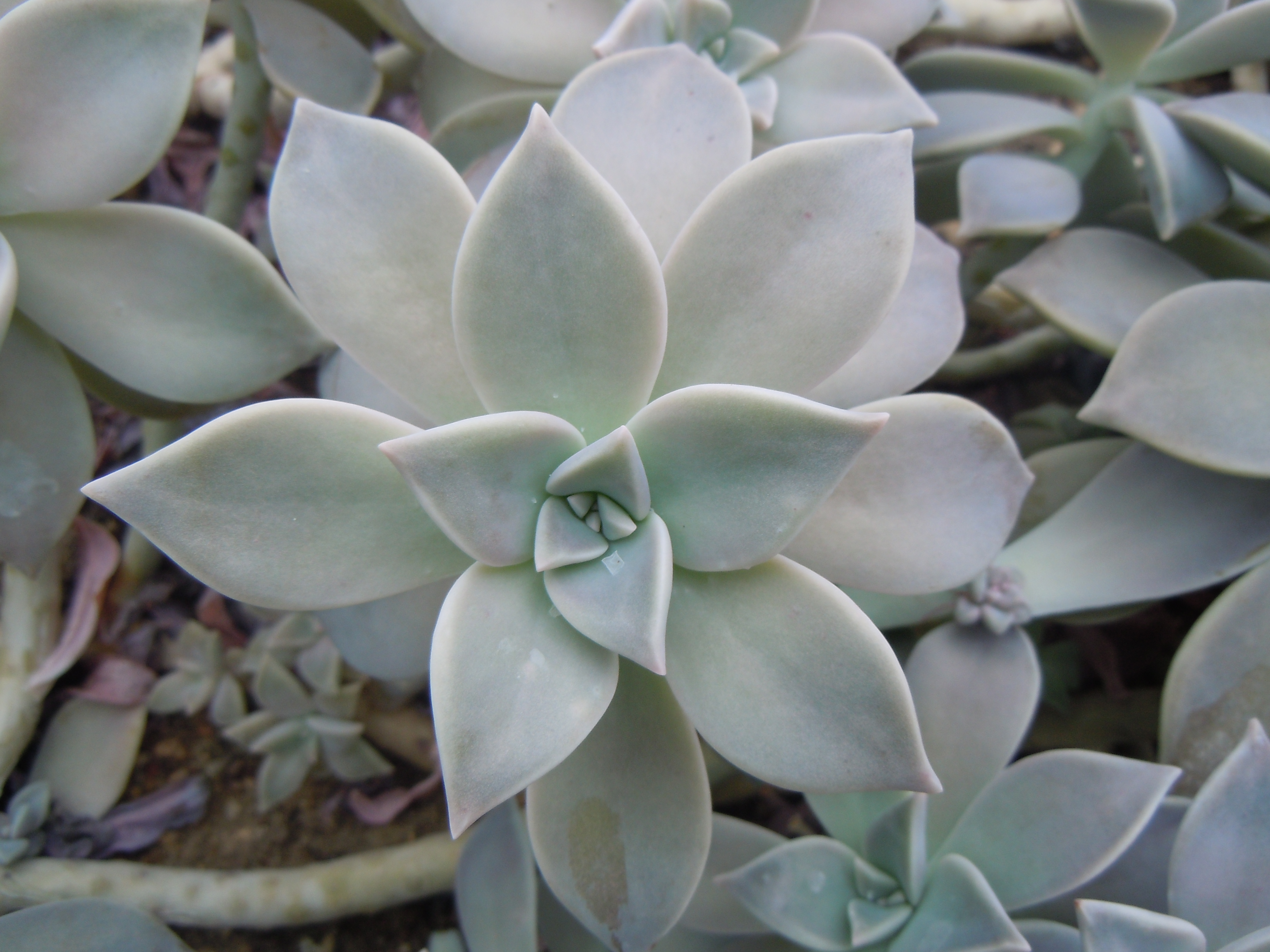
Rosette

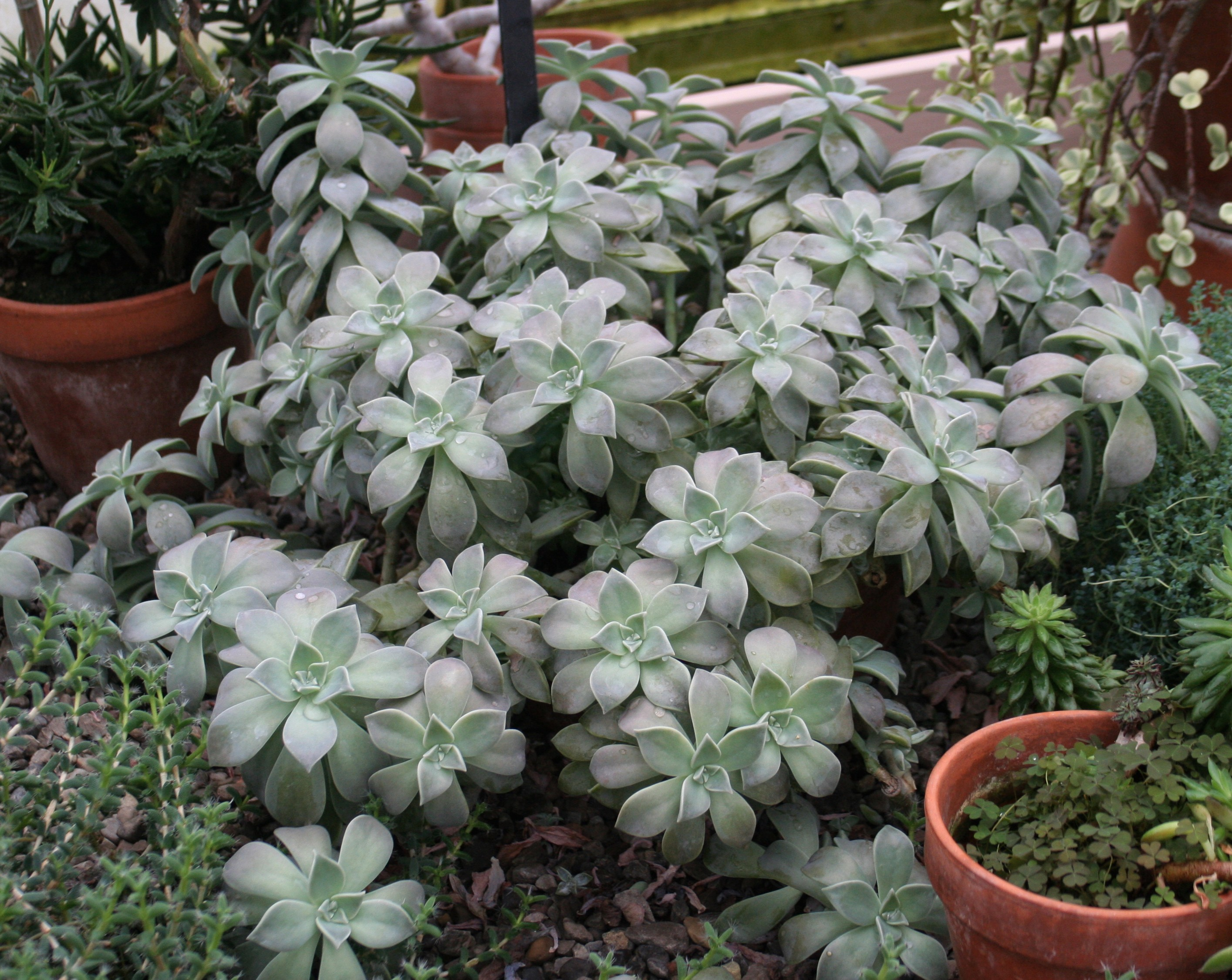
Buffalo and Erie County Botanical Gardens

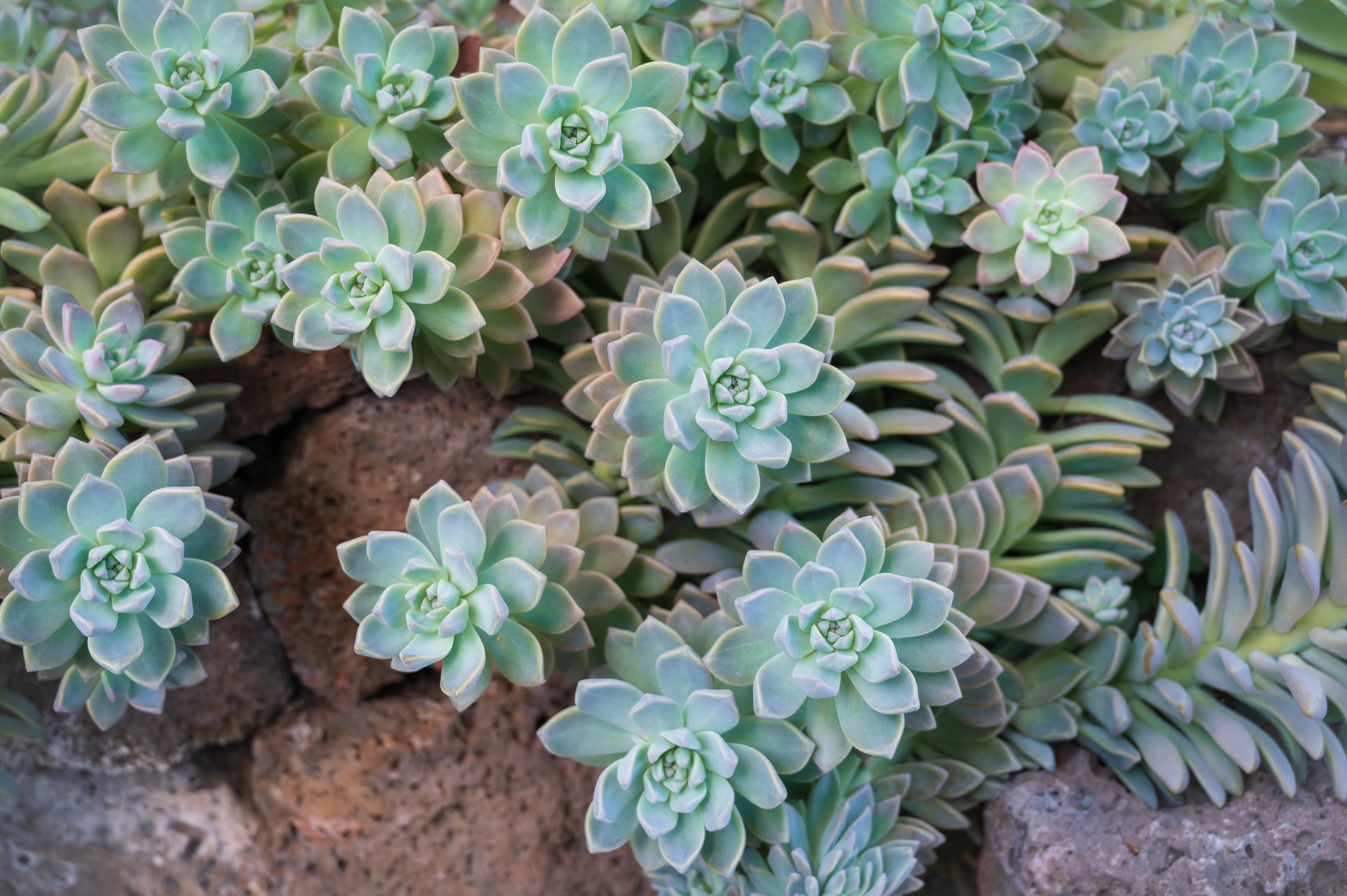
Graptosedum Ghosty, often confused with its parent Graptopetalum Paraguayense.

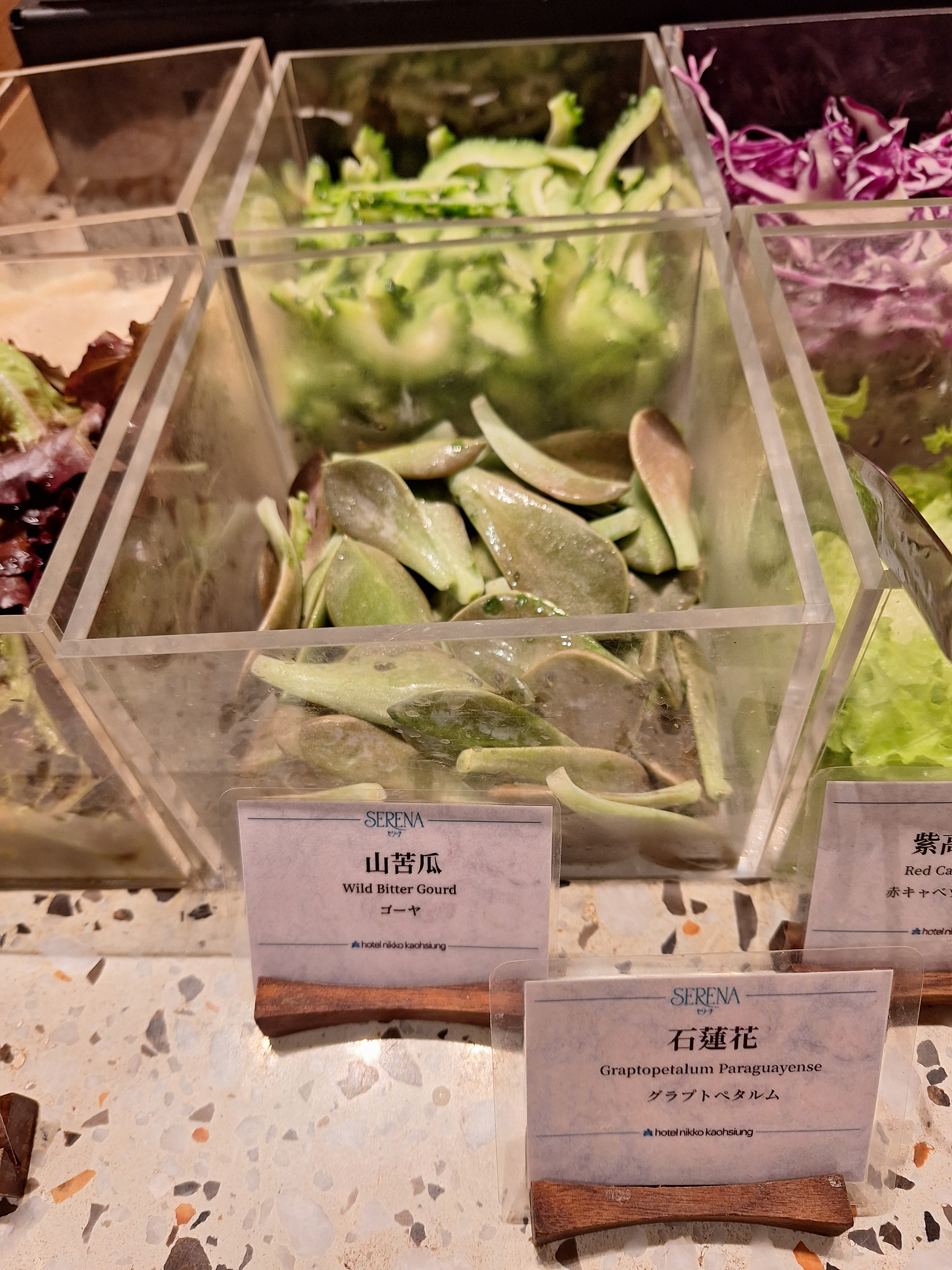
Edible succulent leaves in a salad bar in Taiwan
