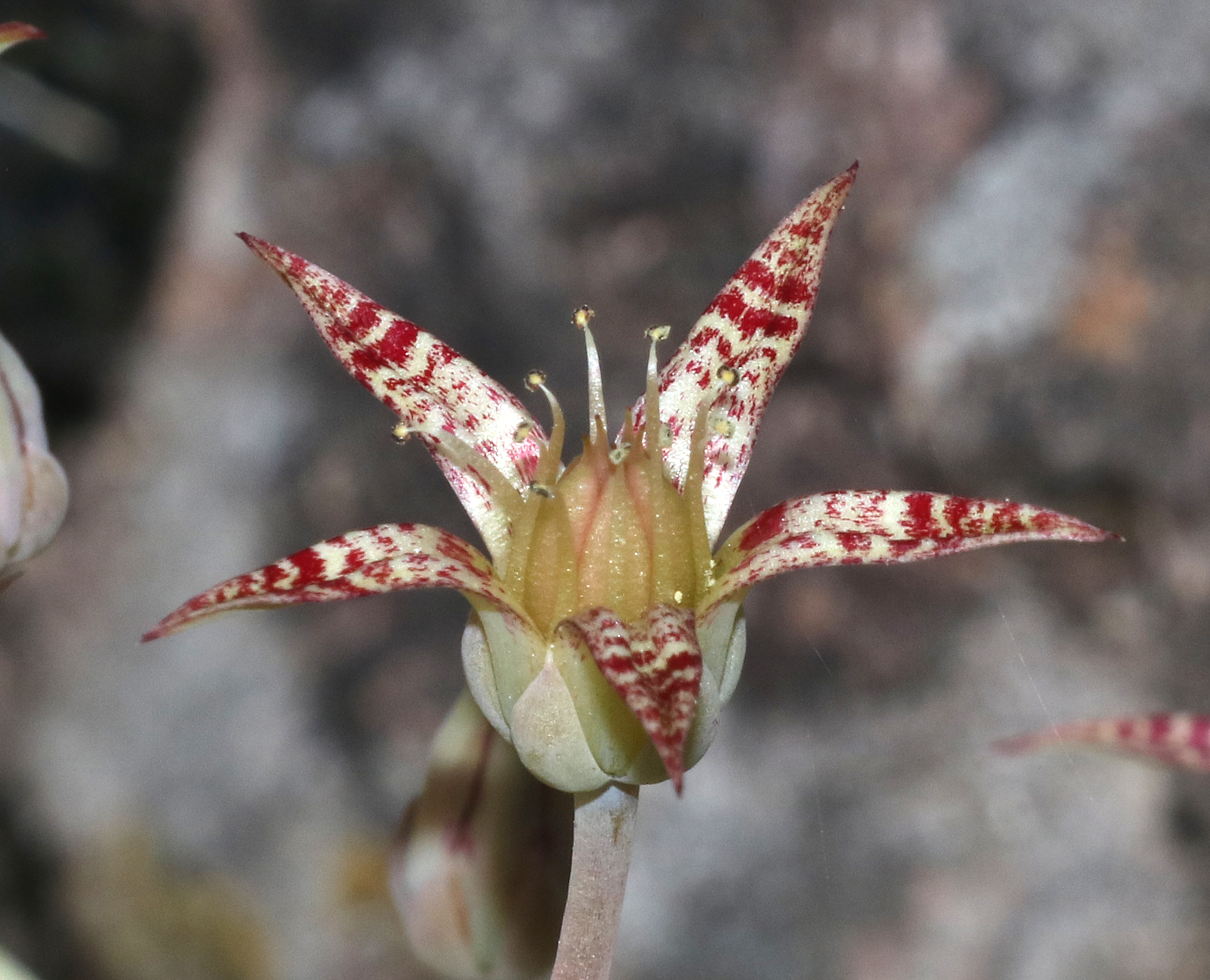
- Flower of G. bartramii

Conservation status
- Imperiled (NatureServe)

Scientific classification
- Kingdom: Plantae
- Clade: Tracheophytes
- Clade: Angiosperms
- Clade: Eudicots
- Order: Saxifragales
- Family: Crassulaceae
- Genus: Graptopetalum
- Species: G. bartramii

Binomial name
- Graptopetalum bartramii Rose

Synonyms
- Echeveria bartramii (Rose) Kearney & Peebles

= Graptopetalum bartramii =

Species of succulent

Graptopetalum bartramii is a species of succulent plant known as Bartram's stonecrop and Patagonia Mountain leatherpetal.

It is endemic to Arizona, in the Patagonia Mountains in Santa Cruz County and within the Coronado National Forest.

It is being evaluated by the United States Fish and Wildlife Service for inclusion on the list of endangered or threatened species under the Endangered Species Act of 1973.
