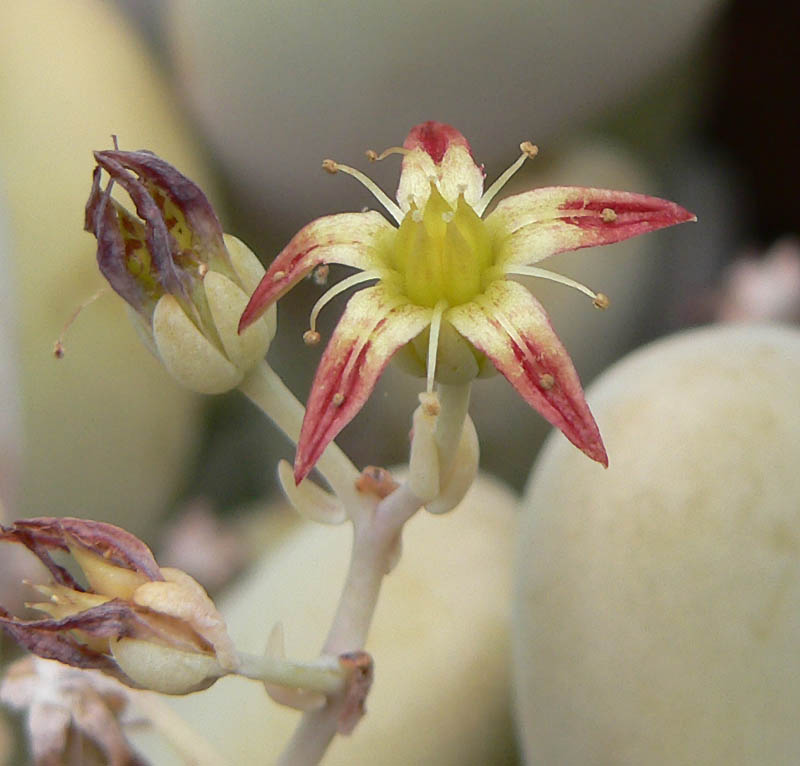
- Graptopetalum amethystinum

Scientific classification
- Kingdom: Plantae
- Clade: Tracheophytes
- Clade: Angiosperms
- Clade: Eudicots
- Order: Saxifragales
- Family: Crassulaceae
- Subfamily: Sempervivoideae
- Tribe: Sedeae
- Genus: Graptopetalum; Rose

Species
- See text

= Graptopetalum =

Genus of succulents

Graptopetalum (leatherpetal) is a genus of flowering plants in the family Crassulaceae. They are perennial succulent plants and native to Mexico and Arizona. They grow usually in a rosette. There are around 19 species in this genus.

== Species ==
- Graptopetalum amethystinum (Rose) E.Walther – Lavender pebbles, jewel-leaf plant
- Graptopetalum bartramii Rose – Patagonia Mountain leatherpetal, Bartram'sstonecrop
- Graptopetalum bellum (Moran & Meyran) D.R.Hunt
- Graptopetalum filiferum (S.Watson) Whitehead
- Graptopetalum fruticosum Moran
- Graptopetalum glassii Acev.-Rosas & Cházaro
- Graptopetalum grande Alexander
- Graptopetalum macdougallii Alexander
- Graptopetalum marginatum Acev.-Rosas & Cházaro
- Graptopetalum mendozae Glass & M.Cházaro Basáñez
- Graptopetalum occidentale Rose ex E.Walther
- Graptopetalum pachyphyllum Rose
- Graptopetalum paraguayense (N.E.Br.) E.Walther – Mother of pearl plant, ghost plant
  - Graptopetalum paraguayense subsp. bernalense Kimnach & R.C.Moran
- Graptopetalum pentandrum Moran
- Graptopetalum pusillum Rose
- Graptopetalum rusbyi (Greene) Rose – San Francisco River leatherpetal
- Graptopetalum saxifragoides Kimnach
  - Graptopetalum saxifragoides var. fariniferum Kimnach
- Graptopetalum superbum (Kimnach) Acev.-Rosas
