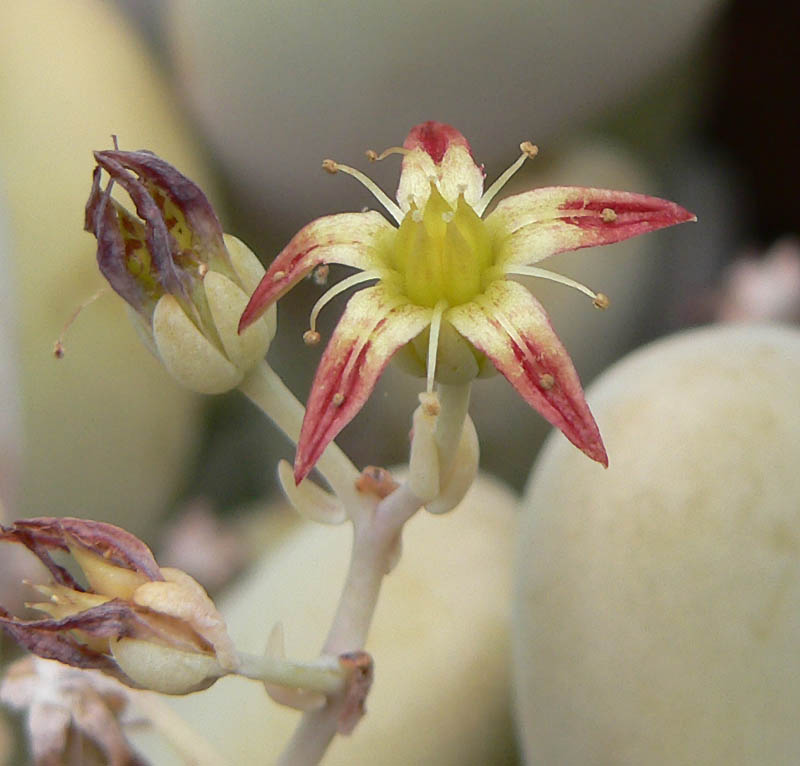

Scientific classification
- Kingdom: Plantae
- Clade: Tracheophytes
- Clade: Angiosperms
- Clade: Eudicots
- Order: Saxifragales
- Family: Crassulaceae
- Genus: Graptopetalum
- Species: G. amethystinum

Binomial name
- Graptopetalum amethystinum (Rose) E. Walther

= Graptopetalum amethystinum =

Species of succulent

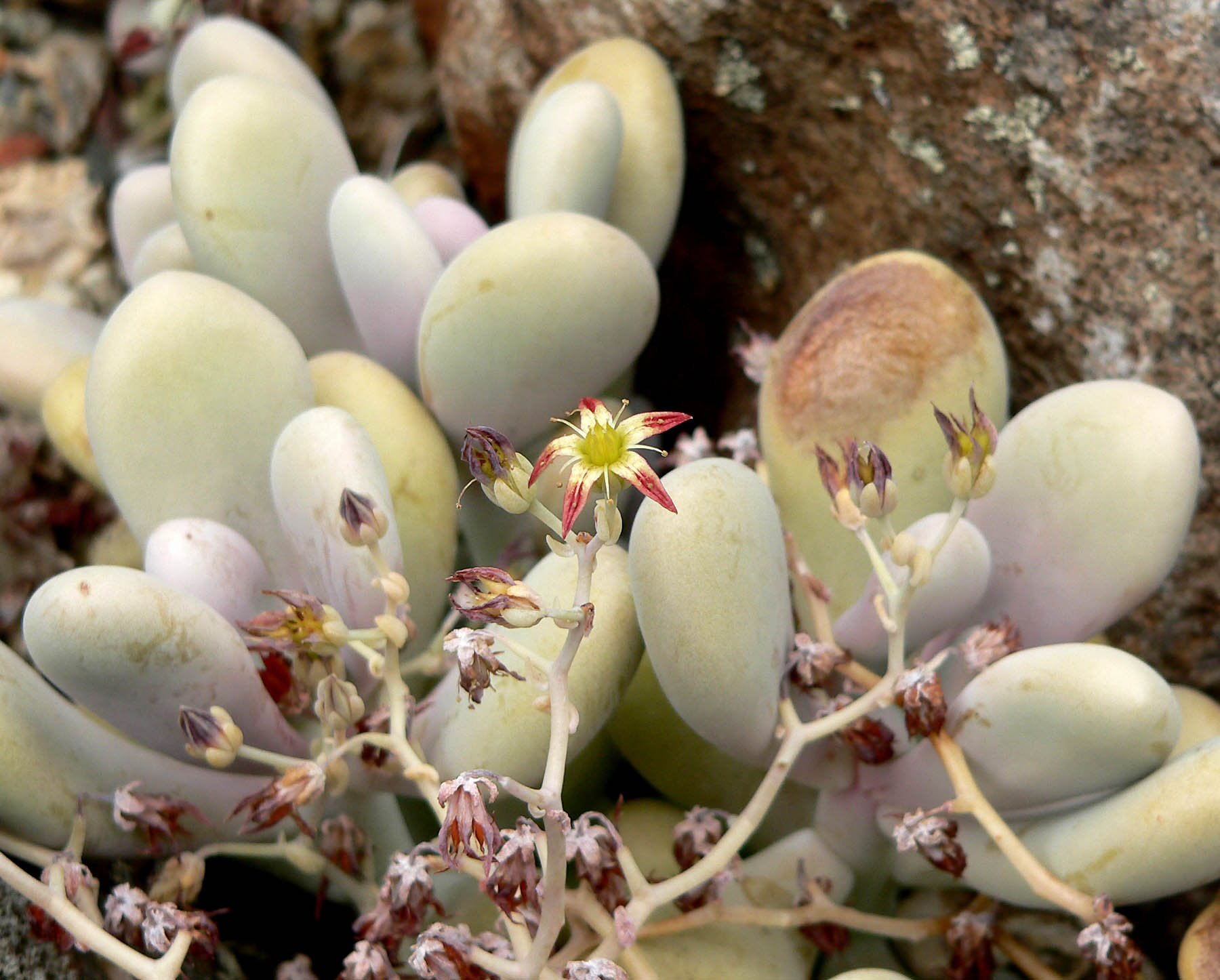

Graptopetalum amethystinum, also called jewel-leaf plant, is a plant belonging to the succulent genus Graptopetalum. It is native to Mexico.
