= List of municipalities in Salamanca =

Administrative divisions of Salamanca, Spain

Map of Spain with the Province of Salamanca highlighted

This is a list of the municipalities in the Province of Salamanca of the autonomous community of Castile and León, Spain. There are 362 municipalities in the province.

Name	Population (2014)
Abusejo	220
Agallas	158
Ahigal de los Aceiteros	143
Ahigal de Villarino	37
La Alameda de Gardón	92
La Alamedilla	150
Alaraz	509
Alba de Tormes	5,341
Alba de Yeltes	234
La Alberca	1,126
La Alberguería de Argañán	140
Alconada	161
Aldea del Obispo	326
Aldeacipreste	130
Aldeadávila de la Ribera	1,288
Aldealengua	678
Aldeanueva de Figueroa	286
Aldeanueva de la Sierra	113
Aldearrodrigo	155
Aldearrubia	494
Aldeaseca de Alba	83
Aldeaseca de la Frontera	290
Aldeatejada	1,673
Aldeavieja de Tormes	101
Aldehuela de la Bóveda	303
Aldehuela de Yeltes	221
Almenara de Tormes	261
Almendra	178
Anaya de Alba	212
Añover de Tormes	94
Arabayona de Mógica	408
Arapiles	632
Arcediano	110
El Arco	89
Armenteros	315
La Atalaya	128
Babilafuente	896
Bañobárez	321
Barbadillo	410
Barbalos	76
Barceo	48
Barruecopardo	510
La Bastida	27
Béjar	13,951
Beleña	212
Bermellar	142
Berrocal de Huebra	71
Berrocal de Salvatierra	84
Boada	300
El Bodón	296
Bogajo	144
La Bouza	73
Bóveda del Río Almar	245
Brincones	61
Buenamadre	134
Buenavista	250
El Cabaco	257
La Cabeza de Béjar	85
Cabeza del Caballo	356
Cabezabellosa de la Calzada	95
Cabrerizos	4,149
Cabrillas	415
Calvarrasa de Abajo	1,140
Calvarrasa de Arriba	615
La Calzada de Béjar	87
Calzada de Don Diego	192
Calzada de Valdunciel	660
Campillo de Azaba	180
El Campo de Peñaranda	284
Candelario	970
Canillas de Abajo	72
Cantagallo	273
Cantalapiedra	1,039
Cantalpino	960
Cantaracillo	203
Carbajosa de la Sagrada	6,763
Carpio de Azaba	101
Carrascal de Barregas	1,069
Carrascal del Obispo	229
Casafranca	70
Las Casas del Conde	57
Casillas de Flores	187
Castellanos de Moriscos	2,229
Castellanos de Villiquera	698
Castillejo de Martín Viejo	241
Castraz	40
Cepeda	361
Cereceda de la Sierra	87
Cerezal de Peñahorcada	83
Cerralbo	175
El Cerro	452
Cespedosa de Tormes	544
Cilleros de la Bastida	27
Cipérez	294
Ciudad Rodrigo	13,209
Coca de Alba	103
Colmenar de Montemayor	196
Cordovilla	124
Cristóbal	170
El Cubo de Don Sancho	466
Chagarcía Medianero	94
Dios le Guarde	147
Doñinos de Ledesma	73
Doñinos de Salamanca	1,911
Ejeme	131
La Encina	121
Encina de San Silvestre	114
Encinas de Abajo	627
Encinas de Arriba	253
Encinasola de los Comendadores	203
Endrinal	238
Escurial de la Sierra	265
Espadaña	34
Espeja	258
Espino de la Orbada	275
Florida de Liébana	290
Forfoleda	194
Frades de la Sierra	220
La Fregeneda	384
Fresnedoso	116
Fresno Alhándiga	263
La Fuente de San Esteban	1,391
Fuenteguinaldo	714
Fuenteliante	117
Fuenterroble de Salvatierra	256
Fuentes de Béjar	251
Fuentes de Oñoro	1,141
Gajates	168
Galindo y Perahuy	714
Galinduste	467
Galisancho	409
Gallegos de Argañán	303
Gallegos de Solmirón	140
Garcibuey	182
Garcihernández	499
Garcirrey	75
Gejuelo del Barro	41
Golpejas	140
Gomecello	478
Guadramiro	156
Guijo de Ávila	90
Guijuelo	5,781
Herguijuela de Ciudad Rodrigo	84
Herguijuela de la Sierra	295
Herguijuela del Campo	94
Hinojosa de Duero	726
Horcajo de Montemayor	158
Horcajo Medianero	224
La Hoya	43
Huerta	309
Iruelos	39
Ituero de Azaba	224
Juzbado	165
Lagunilla	524
Larrodrigo	199
Ledesma	1,795
Ledrada	512
Linares de Riofrío	964
Lumbrales	1,789
Machacón	454
Macotera	1,201
Madroñal	157
El Maíllo	298
Malpartida	101
Mancera de Abajo	227
El Manzano	75
Martiago	266
Martín de Yeltes	441
Martinamor	100
Masueco	336
La Mata de Ledesma	110
Matilla de los Caños del Río	639
La Maya	210
Membribe de la Sierra	140
Mieza	232
El Milano	119
Miranda de Azán	427
Miranda del Castañar	467
Mogarraz	329
Molinillo	60
Monforte de la Sierra	84
Monleón	92
Monleras	250
Monsagro	157
Montejo	209
Montemayor del Río	299
Monterrubio de Armuña	1,319
Monterrubio de la Sierra	178
Morasverdes	289
Morille	258
Moríñigo	106
Moriscos	325
Moronta	86
Mozárbez	502
Narros de Matalayegua	237
Nava de Béjar	105
Nava de Francia	134
Nava de Sotrobal	174
Navacarros	125
Navales	335
Navalmoral de Béjar	56
Navamorales	78
Navarredonda de la Rinconada	194
Navasfrías	486
Negrilla de Palencia	113
Olmedo de Camaces	126
La Orbada	208
Pajares de la Laguna	119
Palacios del Arzobispo	164
Palaciosrubios	405
Palencia de Negrilla	162
Parada de Arriba	265
Parada de Rubiales	288
Paradinas de San Juan	423
Pastores	62
El Payo	368
Pedraza de Alba	253
Pedrosillo de Alba	152
Pedrosillo de los Aires	389
Pedrosillo el Ralo	153
El Pedroso de la Armuña	250
Pelabravo	1,102
Pelarrodríguez	174
Pelayos	101
La Peña	113
Peñacaballera	145
Peñaparda	384
Peñaranda de Bracamonte	6,672
Peñarandilla	223
Peralejos de Abajo	163
Peralejos de Arriba	47
Pereña de la Ribera	392
Peromingo	140
Pinedas	107
El Pino de Tormes	157
Pitiegua	206
Pizarral	57
Poveda de las Cintas	248
Pozos de Hinojo	53
Puebla de Azaba	216
Puebla de San Medel	43
Puebla de Yeltes	149
Puente del Congosto	246
Puertas	83
Puerto de Béjar	393
Puerto Seguro	68
Rágama	245
La Redonda	102
Retortillo	241
La Rinconada de la Sierra	124
Robleda	520
Robliza de Cojos	224
Rollán	388
Saelices el Chico	165
La Sagrada	119
El Sahugo	196
Salamanca	148,042
Saldeana	126
Salmoral	155
Salvatierra de Tormes	62
San Cristóbal de la Cuesta	1,001
San Esteban de la Sierra	343
San Felices de los Gallegos	461
San Martín del Castañar	257
San Miguel de Valero	366
San Miguel del Robledo	69
San Morales	281
San Muñoz	280
San Pedro de Rozados	305
San Pedro del Valle	147
San Pelayo de Guareña	88
Sanchón de la Ribera	75
Sanchón de la Sagrada	41
Sanchotello	229
Sancti-Spíritus	879
Sando	144
Santa María de Sando	127
Santa Marta de Tormes	15,011
Santiago de la Puebla	378
Santibáñez de Béjar	494
Santibáñez de la Sierra	197
Santiz	247
Los Santos	643
Sardón de los Frailes	85
Saucelle	339
Sepulcro-Hilario	179
Sequeros	229
Serradilla del Arroyo	296
Serradilla del Llano	169
La Sierpe	50
Sieteiglesias de Tormes	205
Sobradillo	258
Sorihuela	280
Sotoserrano	626
Tabera de Abajo	110
La Tala	98
Tamames	856
Tarazona de Guareña	358
Tardáguila	230
El Tejado	125
Tejeda y Segoyuela	106
Tenebrón	166
Terradillos	3,202
Topas	564
Tordillos	409
El Tornadizo	98
Torresmenudas	201
Trabanca	223
Tremedal de Tormes	41
Valdecarros	366
Valdefuentes de Sangusín	228
Valdehijaderos	82
Valdelacasa	250
Valdelageve	85
Valdelosa	448
Valdemierque	55
Valderrodrigo	154
Valdunciel	90
Valero	309
Vallejera de Riofrío	70
Valverde de Valdelacasa	65
Valsalabroso	150
Valverdón	280
Vecinos, Salamanca	281
Vega de Tirados	186
Las Veguillas	286
La Vellés	563
Ventosa del Río Almar	122
La Vídola	127
Villaflores	291
Villagonzalo de Tormes	209
Villalba de los Llanos	142
Villamayor	6,941
Villanueva del Conde	162
Villar de Argañán	95
Villar de Ciervo	295
Villar de Gallimazo	185
Villar de la Yegua	196
Villar de Peralonso	260
Villar de Samaniego	90
Villares de la Reina	6,167
Villares de Yeltes	133
Villarino de los Aires	908
Villarmayor	216
Villarmuerto	41
Villasbuenas	214
Villasdardo	18
Villaseco de los Gamitos	156
Villaseco de los Reyes	385
Villasrubias	303
Villaverde de Guareña	145
Villavieja de Yeltes	878
Villoria	1,469
Villoruela	851
Vilvestre	454
Vitigudino	2,750
Yecla de Yeltes	279
Zamarra	110
Zamayón	195
Zarapicos	51
La Zarza de Pumareda	142
Zorita de la Frontera	202

== See also ==
- Geography of Spain
- List of cities in Spain
- Kingdom of León
- Leonese language
