= Salamanca Airport =

Salamanca Airport Aeropuerto de Salamanca

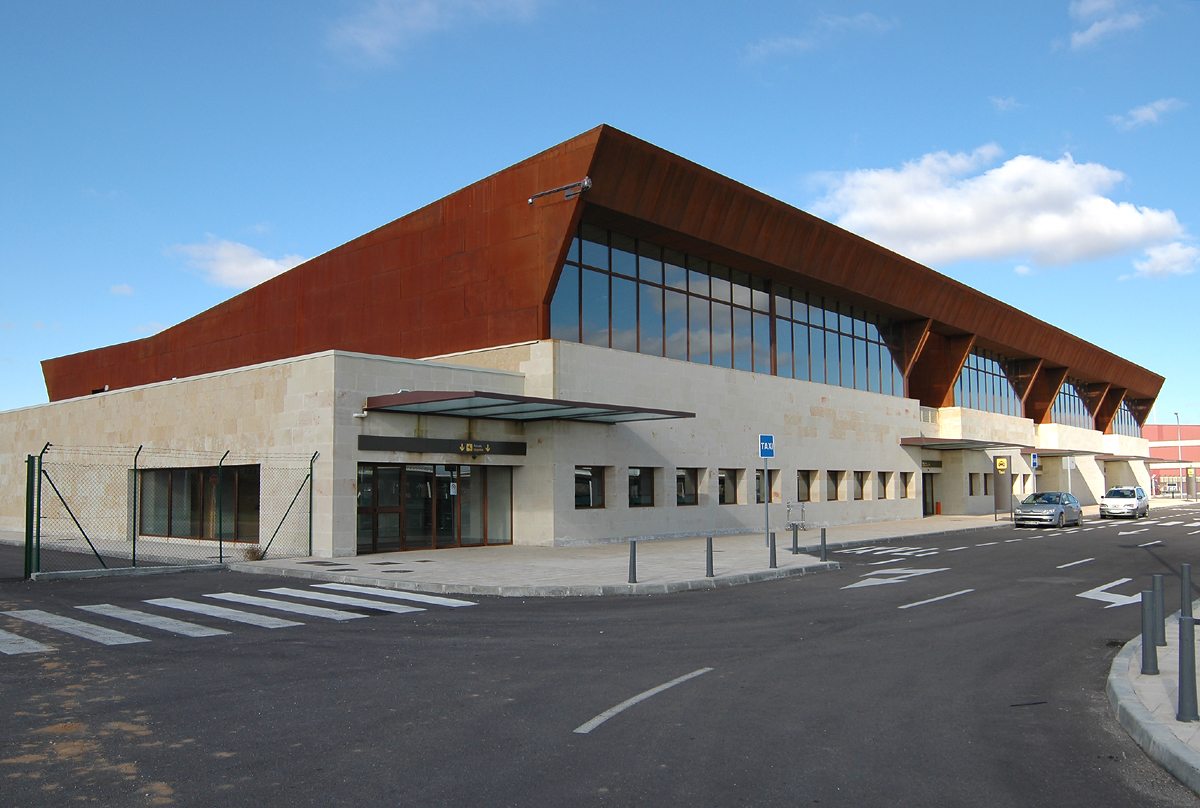
- IATA: SLM; ICAO: LESA

Summary
- Airport type: Public, military
- Owner/Operator: AENA
- Elevation AMSL: 2,595 ft (791 m)
- Coordinates: 40°57′07″N 05°30′07″W

Map
- Location within Spain

Runways
Direction	Length		Surface
Direction	ft	m	Surface
03/21	8,202	2,500	Asphalt
08/26	6,594	2,010	Grass

Statistics (2025)
- Passengers: 25,677
- Passenger change 24-25: ▲27.0%
- Aircraft movements: 9,625
- Sources: Aena

Salamanca Airport (IATA: SLM, ICAO: LESA) is the airport serving the province of Salamanca in the autonomous community of Castile and León. It is located in the municipalities of Machacón, Calvarrasa de Abajo y Villagonzalo de Tormes; and it is 15 km from Salamanca city.

== Airlines and destinations ==
The following airlines operate regular scheduled and charter flights at Salamanca Airport:

Airlines	Destinations
Volotea	Seasonal: Palma de Mallorca

The nearest international airport is Madrid–Barajas Airport, located 228 km (142 mi) south east of Salamanca Airport.
