= Gonzalo de Aguilera Munro =

Spanish aristocrat and military officer

Lieutenant-Colonel Gonzalo de Aguilera Munro
- Born: 26 December 1886; Madrid, Spain
- Died: 15 May 1965 (aged 78); Salamanca, Spain
- Military career
- Allegiance: Nationalist faction
- Branch: Spanish Army
- Rank: Lieutenant-Colonel
- Conflicts: Spanish Civil War

Gonzalo de Aguilera Munro, 11th Conde de Alba de Yeltes (26 December 1886 – 15 May 1965) was a Spanish aristocrat and military officer who served with the nationalist faction of the Spanish Army during the Spanish Civil War. He served as the press officer for General Francisco Franco and General Emilio Mola. He inherited the title of El XI Conde de Alba de Yeltes (English: The 11th Count of Alba de Yeltes) in December 1919.

== Early life ==
Gonzalo de Aguilera Munro was born in Madrid on 26 December 1886, the son of Lieutenant Colonel Agustín Aguilera y Gamboa, 10th Conde de Alba de Yeltes, an officer in the Spanish Cavalry. His mother, Mary Ada Munro, had been born in Boulogne-Sur-Mer in relatively humble circumstances, but would later claim that she was descended from the Scottish aristocracy. At the time of Gonzalo's birth, his parents were not married, and would not be until 1899 when they could marry after Agustín finally received permission from the regent María Christina, at which point Agustín lost his title. The title was restored in 1910 by Alfonso XIII. As a young child, Gonzalo was raised equally in English, French, and Spanish. He was educated in England, first at Wimbledon College, where he was sent at the age of nine, and later at Stonyhurst College, a Jesuit public school in Lancashire where his father had been a pupil. Following his time at Stonyhurst, with no prospects of attending university in England due to his poor academic performance, Gonzalo spent some time in Bavaria where he studied science and philosophy without any notable academic success but where he did learn to speak German.

== Early military career ==
Gonzalo de Aguilera Munro was conscripted into the Spanish Army at the age of 21, entering in February 1908 as a private in the cavalry. He was posted to a stud farm, but immediately took a leave of absence. By August 1908, with the help of his father's influence, he gained admission to the Academia de Caballería in Vallodolid. He graduated as a second lieutenant in June 1911, and after a short time in the Hussars, transferred in February 1912 for active service in Morocco. In November 1912, he won the Cruz Primera Clase del Mérito Militar. On 13 July 1913, he was promoted to first lieutenant, and was posted back to the Spanish mainland a month later. Being fluent in German, French, and English, in June 1916 he was posted as a junior military attaché to Berlin. In November 1917, he was transferred to work in the Oficina Pro Captivis, a humanitarian organisation established by Alfonso XIII to protect the interests of prisoners of war in the First World War. In July 1919, he was promoted to the rank of captain, and he inherited the title of Conde de Alba de Yeltes on 1 December 1919, when his father died. From December 1926 until August 1927, de Aguilera was posted to Tétouan. Following this posting, he was seconded to the Military Household of King Alfonso XIII, where he formed a personal friendship with the King. In 1931, he retired from the Army in protest at the requirement of officers to swear an oath of loyalty to the Second Republic.

== Spanish Civil War ==
Though he was friends with some important figures in the July Coup which began the Spanish Civil War, de Alba de Yeltes himself was not involved in the planning of it. Following the death of Calvo Sotelo on 13 July 1936, de Alba de Yeltes along with his wife and children fled by car from Madrid to Salamanca. After he met with General Emilio Mola on 24 July in Burgos, he was attached informally to Mola's General Staff in the press and propaganda office. He was involved in the fighting as Nationalist troops captured Irún on 4 September 1936.

It is alleged that Gonzalo carried out many atrocities during the Spanish Civil War. At the outbreak of the war, according to his own account, the Conde de Alba de Yeltes lined up the labourers on his estate and shot six of them as a lesson to the others. His estate, Dehesa del Carrascal de Sanchiricones, was located southwest of Salamanca, between the villages of Vecinos and Matilla de los Caños del Rio. Historian Paul Preston wrote that the Conde de Alba de Yeltes' claim to have carried out this killing was untrue, but that four labourers had been executed by Francoist soldiers on the estate of one of his friends living nearby.

As the press officer of the nationalist faction during the Spanish Civil War, de Alba de Yeltes worked with war correspondents covering the war, including Sefton Delmer, Arnold Lunn and Hubert Renfro Knickerbocker. In this capacity, he openly articulated and defended the White Terror against the entire working class, as in these classicidal statements he made to journalist John T. Whitaker:

We have to kill, kill, you know? They are like animals, you know, and we cannot expect them to get rid of the virus of Bolshevism. After all, rats and lice are the carriers of the plague. Now I hope you understand what we mean by the regeneration of Spain... Our program consists... of exterminating one third of the male population of Spain. That would cleanse the country and get rid of the proletariat. And it is also economically convenient. There will be no more unemployment in Spain, do you understand? You know what's wrong with Spain? Modern plumbing! In healthier times - I mean healthier times spiritually you understand - plague and pestilence could be counted on to thin down the Spanish masses... Now with modern sewage disposal and the like they multiply too fast. The masses are no better than animals, you understand, and you can't expect them not to become infected with the virus of bolshevism. After all, rats and lice carry the plague.

He also told the American reporter Hubert R. Knickerbocker:

We are going to execute fifty thousand people in Madrid. And it doesn’t matter where [President] Azaña and [Prime Minister] Largo Caballero or the rest of them try to escape to, because even if it takes us years hunting them down around the entire world, we’ll catch them and kill every last one of them... What you fail to understand is that any stupid democrat, or whatever they want to call themselves, blindly serves the goals of the red revolution. All democrats are slaves of Bolshevism. Hitler is the only one who knows how to recognize a Red when he sees one... We must destroy the brood of red schools that the so-called Republic set up to teach slaves to rebel. The masses only need to read enough to understand orders. We must restore the authority of the Church. The slaves need it to teach them how to behave... It’s deplorable that women vote. No one should vote, least of all women... In our state, people will have the freedom to keep their mouths shut.

de Alba de Yeltes, in his capacity as a press officer, was involved in the Nationalist attempt to hide responsibility for the bombing of Guernica. He participated in the Battle of Santander alongside the Navarrese brigades, and entered the city on 24 August 1937 two hours ahead of the rest of the Nationalist forces. Accompanying the Moroccan troops who entered Barcelona in January 1939, de Alba de Yeltes entered the office of Lluís Companys, President of the Generalitat, and stole his radio set.

== Post-war activities ==
After the war, he broke ties with the Franco regime when he made it clear to the dictator that he had fought for the monarchy and expected the king to return. He retired from the Army in April 1939 and returned to his large estate in Salamanca, where he continued writing and annotating every book in his extensive library.

As he got older, the Conde seemed to suffer increasingly from mental instability. His mental deterioration led his wife Magdalena to request their two sons move back into the family home. On 26 August 1964, he shot dead his two adult sons Gonzalo and Agustín in the family mansion near Salamanca, aged 47 and 39. He was subsequently incarcerated in an asylum in Salamanca, where he died the following year, having never stood trial for this murder. He died in May 1965 of cardio-respiratory failure, having ceased to take his medications. As a result, his title of Count of Alba de Yeltes was passed directly to his granddaughter, Marianela de la Trinidad de Aguilera y Lodeiro.

== Sources ==
- Preston, Paul (2023). Architects of Terror: Paranoia, Conspiracy, and Anti-Semitism in Franco's Spain. London, UK: William Collins. ISBN 978-0-00-852212-4.
