= Veguillas =

Veguillas can refer to:

The name of several places in Spain:

- Veguillas de la Sierra, a town in the province of Teruel, Aragon
- Las Veguillas, a town in the province of Salamanca, Castile-León
- Veguillas, minor local entity in the municipality of Cogolludo, province of Guadalajara, Castile-La Mancha
