= Campo Charro =

Campo de Salamanca
- Comarca
- Nickname: Campo Charro
- Location in Salamanca

- Location in Spain
- Coordinates: 40°47′27″N 5°55′21″W
- Country: Spain
- Autonomous community: Castile and León
- Province: Salamanca
- Capital: Salamanca

Area
  - Total: 1,679.69 km^{2} (648.53 sq mi)

Population (2010)
  - Total: 191,517
  - Density: 114.019/km^{2} (295.309/sq mi)
- Time zone: UTC+1 (CET)
  - Summer (DST): UTC+2 (CEST)

Campo Charro is one of the 11 comarcas in the province of Salamanca, Castile and León. It contains 42 municipalities: Aldeatejada, Aldehuela de la Bóveda, Arapiles, Barbadillo, Barbalos, Berrocal de Huebra, Buenamadre, Calvarrasa de Abajo, Calvarrasa de Arriba, Calzada de Don Diego, Canillas de Abajo, Carbajosa de la Sagrada, Carrascal de Barregas, Carrascal del Obispo, Doñinos de Salamanca, El Pino de Tormes, Florida de Liébana, Galindo y Perahuy, Garcirrey, La Sagrada, Las Veguillas, Machacón, Matilla de los Caños del Río, Miranda de Azán, Monterrubio de la Sierra, Morille, Mozárbez, Narros de Matalayegua, Parada de Arriba, Pelabravo, Pelarrodríguez, Robliza de Cojos, Salamanca, San Muñoz, San Pedro de Rozados, Sanchón de la Sagrada, Santa Marta de Tormes, Tamames, Tejeda y Segoyuela, Vecinos, Villagonzalo de Tormes and Villalba de los Llanos.
