= Berrocal (disambiguation) =

Berrocal is a city in the province of Huelva, Spain.

Berrocal may also refer to:

== Places ==
- Berrocal de Huebra, Salamanca, Spain
- Berrocal de Salvatierra, Salamanca, Spain

== People ==
- Carla Berrocal (born 1983), Spanish comics illustrator
- Carlos Berrocal (born 1957), Puerto Rican Olympic swimmer
- Jac Berrocal (born 1946), French musician
- Jesús Berrocal (born 1988), Spanish footballer
- José Berrocal (1957–2000), president of Puerto Rico Government Development Bank
- Juan Berrocal González (born 1999), Spanish footballer
- Miguel Ortiz Berrocal (1933–2006), Spanish artist known for his puzzle sculptures
- Yola Berrocal (born 1970), Spanish dancer, singer, and actress
