= Golpejas =

- Municipality
- Coat of arms

- Location in Salamanca

- Location in Spain
- Coordinates: 40°59′59″N 5°54′24″W
- Country: Spain
- Autonomous community: Castile and León
- Province: Salamanca
- Comarca: Tierra de Ledesma

Government
  - Mayor: Alejandro Román (People's Party)

Area
  - Total: 12 km^{2} (4.6 sq mi)
- Elevation: 787 m (2,582 ft)

Population (2025-01-01)
  - Total: 139
  - Density: 12/km^{2} (30/sq mi)
- Time zone: UTC+1 (CET)
  - Summer (DST): UTC+2 (CEST)
- Postal code: 37170

Golpejas is a village and municipality in the province of Salamanca, western Spain, part of the autonomous community of Castile-Leon. It is located 22 kilometres (14 mi) from the provincial capital city of Salamanca and has a population of 155 people.

== History ==
The founding of Golpejas dates back to the Middle Ages, obeying the repopulations carried out by the Leonese kings in the High Middle Ages, the town being placed in the jurisdiction of Ledesma since the creation of its alfoz by Fernando II de León in the 12th century, as well as its archdeaconry.6 With the creation of the current provinces in 1833, Golpejas was integrated into the province of Salamanca, within the Leonese Region.7 In the 20th century its tin mines had a certain strength, closed in 1988.

== Culture ==
The Golpejas festivities take place on August 24, in honor of Saint Bartholomew, patron saint of the town

== Geography ==
The municipality covers an area of 12 km^{2} (4.6 sq mi), and lies 787 metres (2,582 ft) above sea level. The postal code is 37170.

== See also ==
- List of municipalities in Salamanca
