= Monterrubio de la Sierra =

- Municipality
- Location in Salamanca

- Location in Spain
- Coordinates: 40°45′28″N 5°41′34″W
- Country: Spain
- Autonomous community: Castile and León
- Province: Salamanca
- Comarca: Campo de Salamanca

Government
  - Mayor: Agustín Martín Sánchez (PSOE)

Area
  - Total: 35 km^{2} (14 sq mi)
- Elevation: 967 m (3,173 ft)

Population (2025-01-01)
  - Total: 150
  - Density: 4.3/km^{2} (11/sq mi)
- Time zone: UTC+1 (CET)
  - Summer (DST): UTC+2 (CEST)
- Postal code: 37788

Monterrubio de la Sierra is a village and municipality in the province of Salamanca, western Spain, part of the autonomous community of Castile-Leon. It is located 27 kilometres (17 mi) from the provincial capital city of Salamanca and has a population of 169 people.

== Geography ==
The municipality covers an area of 35 km^{2} (14 sq mi). It lies 967 metres (3,173 ft) above sea level and the postal code is 37788.

== See also ==
- List of municipalities in Salamanca
