= El Tornadizo =

- Municipality
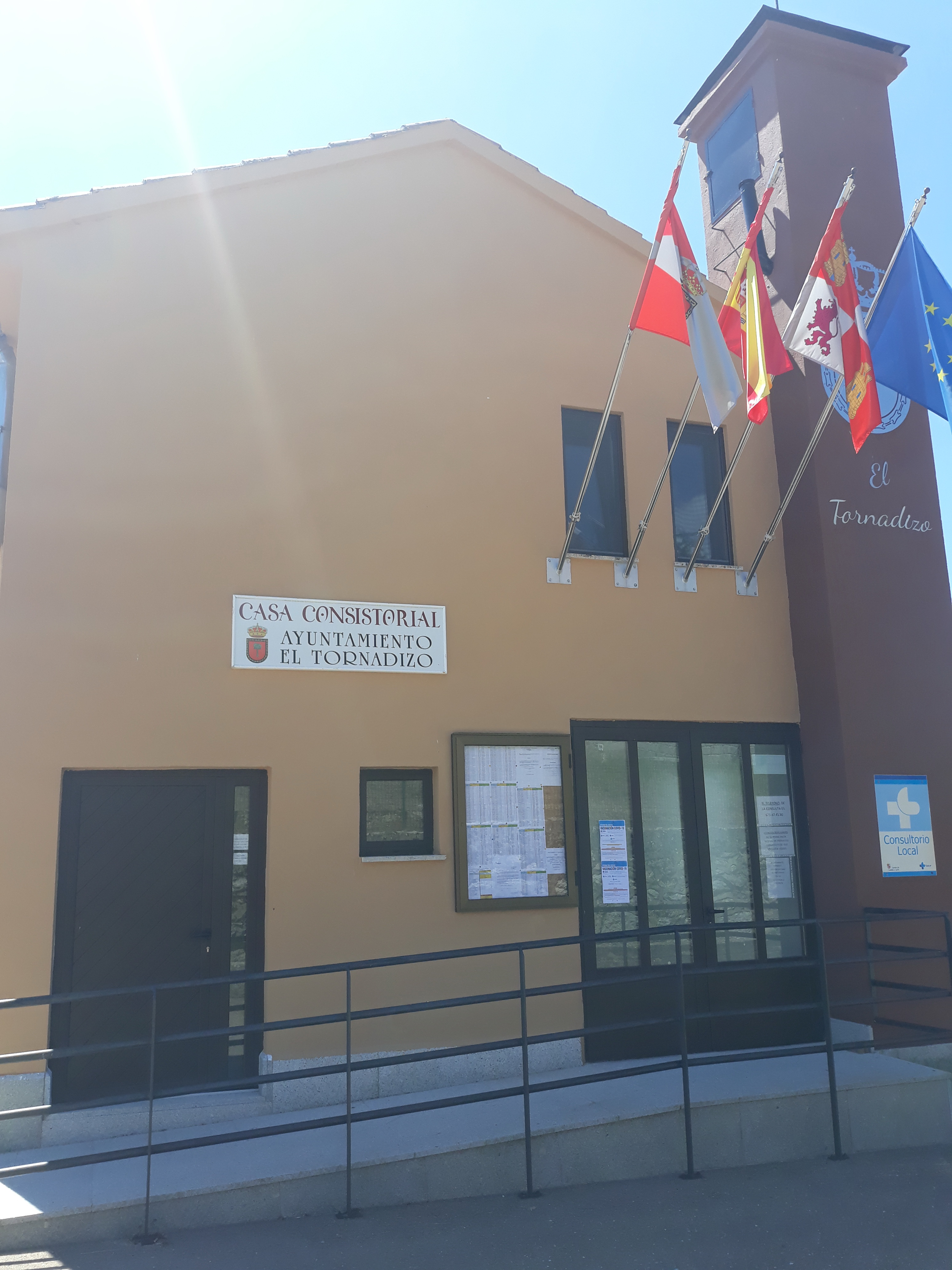

- Flag Coat of arms

- Location in Salamanca

- Location in Spain
- Coordinates: 40°32′N 5°53′W
- Country: Spain
- Autonomous community: Castile and León
- Province: Salamanca
- Comarca: Sierra de Francia

Government
  - Mayor: Feliciana Oliva Santa Martina (People's Party)

Area
  - Total: 11 km^{2} (4.2 sq mi)
- Elevation: 887 m (2,910 ft)

Population (2025-01-01)
  - Total: 88
  - Density: 8.0/km^{2} (21/sq mi)
- Time zone: UTC+1 (CET)
  - Summer (DST): UTC+2 (CEST)
- Postal code: 37765

El Tornadizo is a village and municipality in the province of Salamanca, western Spain, part of the autonomous community of Castile-Leon. It is located 61 kilometres (38 mi) from the provincial capital city of Salamanca and has a population of 88 people.

== Geography ==
The municipality lies 887 metres (2,910 ft) above sea level and covers an area of 11 km^{2} (4.2 sq mi). The postal code is 37765.

== Economy ==
- The basis of the economy is agriculture.

== See also ==
- List of municipalities in Salamanca
