= Santa Marta de Tormes =

- Municipality
- Flag Coat of arms

- Location in Salamanca

- Location in Spain
- Coordinates: 40°56′58″N 5°37′57″W
- Country: Spain
- Autonomous community: Castile and León
- Province: Salamanca
- Comarca: Campo de Salamanca

Government
  - Mayor: David Mingo Pérez (People's Party)

Area
  - Total: 10 km^{2} (3.9 sq mi)
- Elevation (AMSL): 778 m (2,552 ft)

Population (2025-01-01)
  - Total: 14,976
  - Density: 1,500/km^{2} (3,900/sq mi)
- Time zone: UTC+1 (CET)
  - Summer (DST): UTC+2 (CEST (GMT +2))
- Postal code: 37900, 37194
- Area code: +34 (Spain) + 923 (Salamanca)
- Website: www.santamartadetormes.es

Santa Marta de Tormes (Saint Martha upon Tormes) is a municipality in the province of Salamanca, western Spain, part of the autonomous community of Castile and León, on the outskirts of the capital Salamanca, located only 3 kilometers away. It is part of the Campo de Salamanca region (Campo Charro), and belongs to the judicial district of Salamanca.

Its municipal area is made up of a single population center, which occupies a total of 10.01 km^2. In 2018, it had a population of 14,732.

== Culture ==
- San Blas Festival 3 February
- Santa Marta Festival 29 July

== See also ==
- List of municipalities in Salamanca
