= Horcajo de Montemayor =

- Municipality
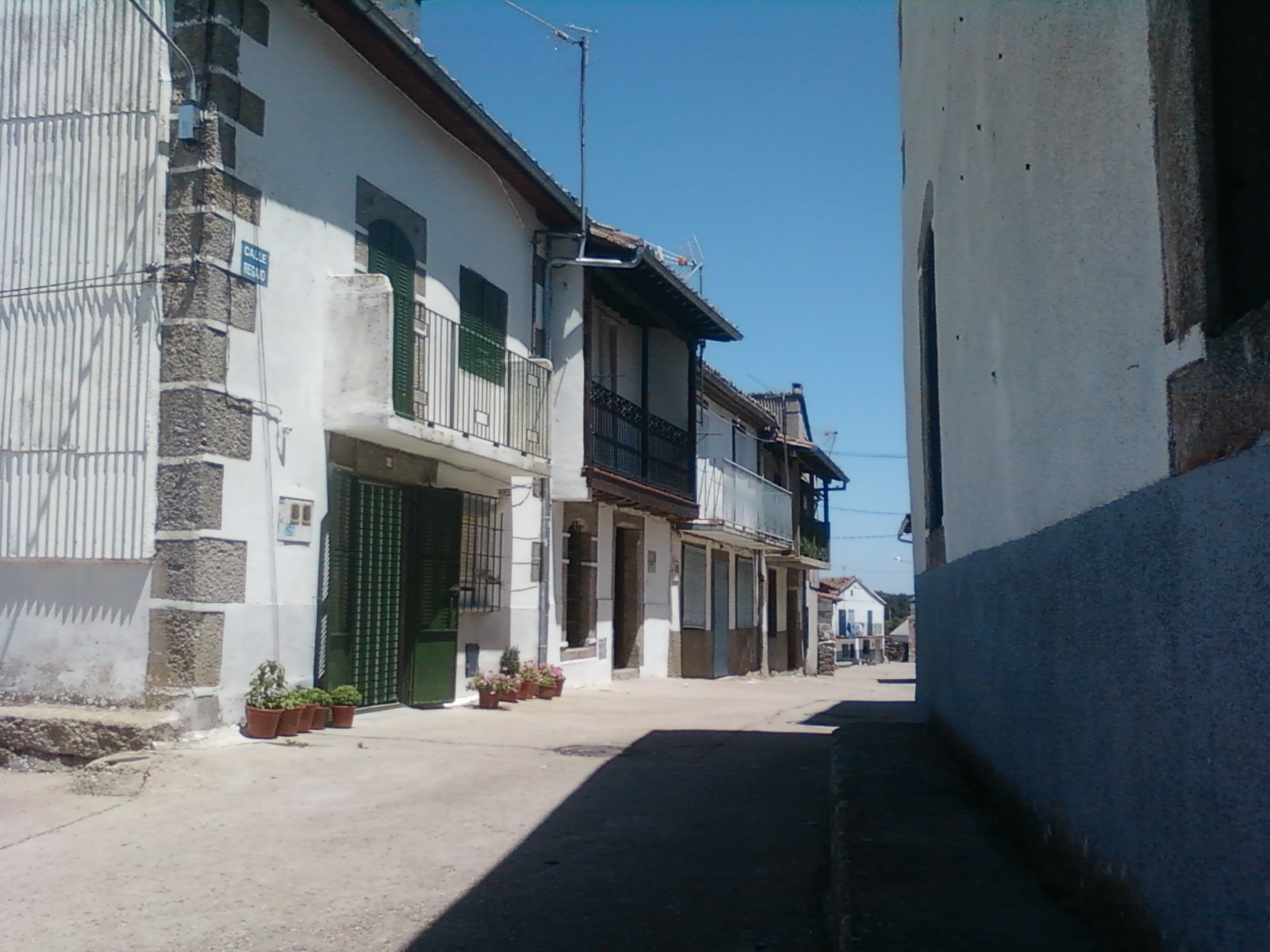

- Location in Salamanca

- Location in Spain
- Coordinates: 40°25′17″N 5°53′37″W
- Country: Spain
- Autonomous community: Castile and León
- Province: Salamanca
- Comarca: Sierra de Béjar

Government
  - Mayor: Domingo Sánchez (People's Party)

Area
  - Total: 30 km^{2} (12 sq mi)
- Elevation: 738 m (2,421 ft)

Population (2025-01-01)
  - Total: 107
  - Density: 3.6/km^{2} (9.2/sq mi)
- Time zone: UTC+1 (CET)
  - Summer (DST): UTC+2 (CEST)
- Postal code: 37712

Horcajo de Montemayor is a village and municipality in the province of Salamanca, western Spain, part of the autonomous community of Castile-Leon. It is located 90 kilometres (56 mi) from the provincial capital city of Salamanca and has a population of 154 people.

== Geography ==
The municipality covers an area of 30 km^{2} (12 sq mi). It lies 738 metres (2,421 ft) above sea level.

== See also ==
- List of municipalities in Salamanca
