= Forfoleda =

- Municipality
- Coat of arms

- Location in Salamanca

- Location in Spain
- Coordinates: 41°05′43″N 5°45′38″W
- Country: Spain
- Autonomous community: Castile and León
- Province: Salamanca
- Comarca: La Armuña

Government
  - Mayor: J. Feliciano Medina (People's Party)

Area
  - Total: 38 km^{2} (15 sq mi)
- Elevation: 799 m (2,621 ft)

Population (2025-01-01)
  - Total: 207
  - Density: 5.4/km^{2} (14/sq mi)
- Time zone: UTC+1 (CET)
  - Summer (DST): UTC+2 (CEST)
- Postal code: 37797

Forfoleda is a village and municipality in the province of Salamanca, western Spain, part of the autonomous community of Castile-Leon. It is located 18 kilometres (11 mi) from the provincial capital city of Salamanca and has a population of 189 people.

== Geography ==
The municipality covers an area of 38.07 km^{2} (14.70 sq mi).

It lies 799 metres (2,621 ft) above sea level.

The postal code is 37797.

== See also ==
- List of municipalities in Salamanca
