= Doñinos de Salamanca =

- Municipality
- Coat of arms

- Location in Salamanca

- Location in Spain
- Coordinates: 40°57′39″N 5°44′48″W
- Country: Spain
- Autonomous community: Castile and León
- Province: Salamanca
- Comarca: Campo de Salamanca

Government
  - Mayor: Manuel Hernández Pérez (Citizens)

Area
  - Total: 14 km^{2} (5.4 sq mi)
- Elevation: 828 m (2,717 ft)

Population (2025-01-01)
  - Total: 2,273
  - Density: 160/km^{2} (420/sq mi)
- Time zone: UTC+1 (CET)
  - Summer (DST): UTC+2 (CEST)
- Postal code: 37120

Doñinos de Salamanca is a village and municipality in the province of Salamanca, western Spain, part of the autonomous community of Castile-Leon. It is located 7 kilometres (4.3 mi) from the provincial capital city of Salamanca and has a population of 1,996 people.

== Geography ==
The municipality covers an area of 14 km^{2} (5.4 sq mi). It lies 828 metres (2,717 ft) above sea level and the postal code is 37120.

== See also ==
List of municipalities in Salamanca
