= Bóveda del Río Almar =

- Municipality
- Flag Coat of arms

- Location in Salamanca

- Location in Spain
- Coordinates: 40°51′24″N 5°12′38″W
- Country: Spain
- Autonomous community: Castile and León
- Province: Salamanca
- Comarca: Tierra de Peñaranda

Government
  - Mayor: Juan Carlos Muñoz Pérez (People's Party)

Area
  - Total: 23 km^{2} (8.9 sq mi)
- Elevation: 819 m (2,687 ft)

Population (2025-01-01)
  - Total: 186
  - Density: 8.1/km^{2} (21/sq mi)
- Time zone: UTC+1 (CET)
  - Summer (DST): UTC+2 (CEST)
- Postal code: 37316

Bóveda del Río Almar is a village and municipality in the province of Salamanca, western Spain, part of the autonomous community of Castile-Leon. It is 45 kilometres (28 mi) from the provincial capital city of Salamanca and as of 2016 has a population of 245 people.

It lies 819 metres (2,687 ft) above sea level.

== See also ==
- List of municipalities in Salamanca
