= Encinas de Abajo =

- Municipality
- Location in Salamanca

- Location in Spain
- Coordinates: 40°56′N 5°28′W
- Country: Spain
- Autonomous community: Castile and León
- Province: Salamanca
- Comarca: Las Villas

Government
  - Mayor: José Luis Haro Sánchez (People's Party)

Area
  - Total: 21 km^{2} (8.1 sq mi)
- Elevation: 796 m (2,612 ft)

Population (2025-01-01)
  - Total: 615
  - Density: 29/km^{2} (76/sq mi)
- Time zone: UTC+1 (CET)
  - Summer (DST): UTC+2 (CEST)
- Postal code: 37182

Encinas de Abajo is a village and municipality in the province of Salamanca, Spain, which is part of the autonomous community of Castile-Leon. It is located 17 kilometres (11 mi) from the provincial capital city of Salamanca, and had a population in 2016 of 666.

== Geography ==
The municipality covers an area of 201 km^{2} (78 sq mi) and lies 796 metres (2,612 ft) above sea level. The postal code is 37182.

== Economy ==
- The basis of the economy is agriculture.

== See also ==
- List of municipalities in Salamanca
