= Garcirrey =

- Municipality
- Coat of arms

- Location in Salamanca

- Location in Spain
- Coordinates: 40°54′03″N 6°07′48″W
- Country: Spain
- Autonomous community: Castile and León
- Province: Salamanca
- Comarca: Campo de Salamanca

Government
  - Mayor: José Hernández (People's Party)

Area
  - Total: 84 km^{2} (32 sq mi)
- Elevation: 816 m (2,677 ft)

Population (2025-01-01)
  - Total: 52
  - Density: 0.62/km^{2} (1.6/sq mi)
- Time zone: UTC+1 (CET)
  - Summer (DST): UTC+2 (CEST)
- Postal code: 37469

Garcirrey is a village and large municipality in the province of Salamanca, western Spain, part of the autonomous community of Castile-Leon. It is located 46 kilometres (29 mi) from the provincial capital city of Salamanca and has a population of 69 people.

== Geography ==
The municipality covers an area of 84 km^{2} (32 sq mi). It lies 816 metres (2,677 ft) above sea level and the postal code is 37469.

== See also ==
- List of municipalities in Salamanca
