= Fresnedoso =

- Municipality
- Coat of arms

- Location in Salamanca

- Location in Spain
- Coordinates: 40°26′N 5°42′W
- Country: Spain
- Autonomous community: Castile and León
- Province: Salamanca
- Comarca: Sierra de Béjar

Government
  - Mayor: María Guadalupe Gómez González (People's Party)

Area
  - Total: 8 km^{2} (3.1 sq mi)
- Elevation: 1,022 m (3,353 ft)

Population (2025-01-01)
  - Total: 94
  - Density: 12/km^{2} (30/sq mi)
- Time zone: UTC+1 (CET)
  - Summer (DST): UTC+2 (CEST)
- Postal code: 37775

Fresnedoso is a village and municipality in the province of Salamanca, western Spain, part of the autonomous community of Castile-Leon. It is located 75 kilometres (47 mi) from the provincial capital city of Salamanca and has a population of 107 people.

== Geography ==
The municipality covers an area of 8 km^{2} (3.1 sq mi). It lies 1,022 metres (3,353 ft) above sea level and the postal code is 37775

== See also ==
- List of municipalities in Salamanca
