= Galindo y Perahuy =

- Municipality
- Location in Salamanca

- Location in Spain
- Coordinates: 40°56′36″N 5°52′18″W
- Country: Spain
- Autonomous community: Castile and León
- Province: Salamanca
- Comarca: Campo de Salamanca

Government
  - Mayor: Francisco Jesús Rodríguez

Area
  - Total: 44 km^{2} (17 sq mi)
- Elevation: 797 m (2,615 ft)

Population (2025-01-01)
  - Total: 713
  - Density: 16/km^{2} (42/sq mi)
- Time zone: UTC+1 (CET)
  - Summer (DST): UTC+2 (CEST)
- Postal code: 37449

Galindo y Perahuy is a village and municipality in the province of Salamanca, in western Spain, part of the autonomous community of Castile-Leon. It is located 22 kilometres (14 mi) from the provincial capital city of Salamanca and has a population of 693 people.

== Geography ==
The municipality covers an area of 44 km^{2} (17 sq mi). It lies 797 metres (2,615 ft) above sea level and the postal code is 37449.

== Transport ==
The village is connected via the A-62 highway to Portugal.

Lately the population has been increasing due to nearby residential developments like "La RAD". Nevertheless people living there are linked mainly to Salamanca and not to Galindo y Perahuy.

== See also ==
- List of municipalities in Salamanca
