= Palacios del Arzobispo =

- Municipality
- Coat of arms

- Location in Salamanca

- Location in Spain
- Coordinates: 41°09′56″N 5°53′24″W
- Country: Spain
- Autonomous community: Castile and León
- Province: Salamanca
- Comarca: Tierra de Ledesma

Government
  - Mayor: Isabel Herrero (People's Party)

Area
  - Total: 28 km^{2} (11 sq mi)
- Elevation: 824 m (2,703 ft)

Population (2025-01-01)
  - Total: 141
  - Density: 5.0/km^{2} (13/sq mi)
- Time zone: UTC+1 (CET)
  - Summer (DST): UTC+2 (CEST)
- Postal code: 37111

Palacios del Arzobispo (Spanish for "Palaces of the Archbishop") is a village and municipality in the province of Salamanca in western Spain, part of the autonomous community of Castile and León. It is located 33 km (21 mi) from the provincial capital of Salamanca and has a population of 163 people.

== Geography ==
The municipality covers an area of 28 km^{2} (11 sq mi).

It lies 824 m (2,703 ft) above sea level.

The postal code is 37111.

== Culture ==
Every year a fiesta is held on June 24 to commemorate John the Baptist.

== See also ==
- List of municipalities in Salamanca
