= La Cabeza de Béjar =

- Municipality
- Location in Salamanca

- Location in Spain
- Coordinates: 40°30′1″N 5°39′0″W
- Country: Spain
- Autonomous community: Castile and León
- Province: Salamanca
- Comarca: Sierra de Béjar

Government
  - Mayor: Félix Sánchez (People's Party)

Area
  - Total: 13.9 km^{2} (5.4 sq mi)
- Elevation: 1,036 m (3,399 ft)

Population (2025-01-01)
  - Total: 55
  - Density: 4.0/km^{2} (10/sq mi)
- Time zone: UTC+1 (CET)
  - Summer (DST): UTC+2 (CEST)
- Postal code: 37777

La Cabeza de Béjar is a mountainous village and municipality in the province of Salamanca, western Spain, part of the autonomous community of Castile and León. It is located 55 kilometres (34 mi) from the provincial capital city of Salamanca and has a population of 93 people.

== Geography ==
The municipality covers an area of 14 km^{2} (5.4 sq mi). It lies 1,036 metres (3,399 ft) above sea level and the postal code is 37777.

== See also ==
- List of municipalities in Salamanca
