= Florida de Liébana =

- Municipality
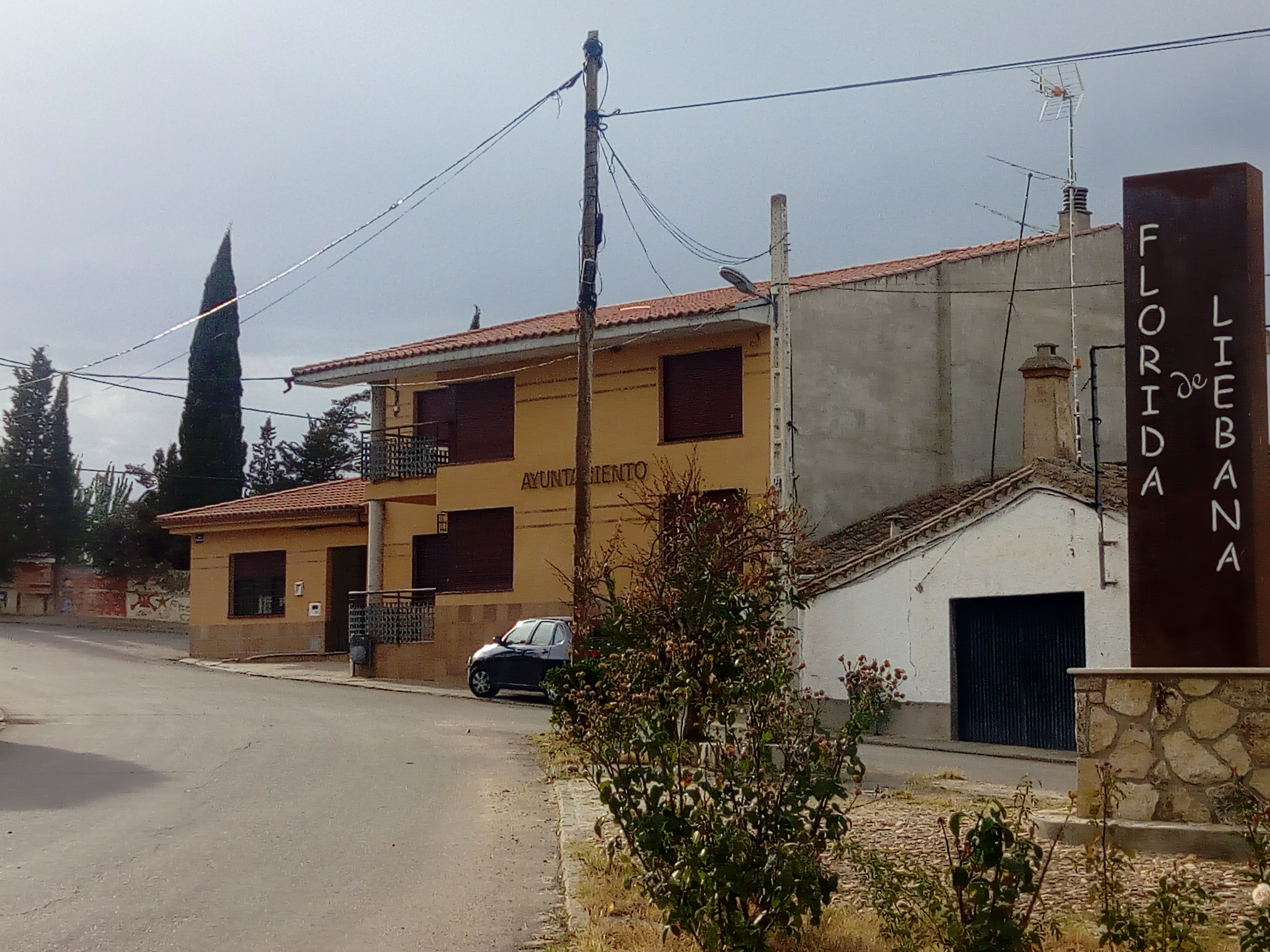

- Location in Salamanca

- Location in Spain
- Coordinates: 41°01′36″N 5°45′03″W
- Country: Spain
- Autonomous community: Castile and León
- Province: Salamanca
- Comarca: Campo de Salamanca

Government
  - Mayor: Maria Luisa Martín (PSOE)

Area
  - Total: 21 km^{2} (8.1 sq mi)
- Elevation: 789 m (2,589 ft)

Population (2025-01-01)
  - Total: 248
  - Density: 12/km^{2} (31/sq mi)
- Time zone: UTC+1 (CET)
  - Summer (DST): UTC+2 (CEST)
- Postal code: 37129

Florida de Liébana is a village and municipality in the province of Salamanca, western Spain, part of the autonomous community of Castile-Leon. It is located 14 kilometres (8.7 mi) from the provincial capital city of Salamanca and has a population of 259 people.

== Geography ==
The municipality covers an area of 21 km^{2} (8.1 sq mi).

It lies 780 metres (2,560 ft) above sea level and the postal code is 37129.

== See also ==
- List of municipalities in Salamanca
