= Encinas de Arriba =

- municipality
- Coat of arms

- Location in Salamanca

- Location in Spain
- Country: Spain
- Autonomous community: Castile and León
- Province: Salamanca

Area
  - Total: 9 km^{2} (3.5 sq mi)

Population (2025-01-01)
  - Total: 223
  - Density: 25/km^{2} (64/sq mi)

Encinas de Arriba is a village and municipality in the province of Salamanca, western Spain, part of the autonomous community of Castile-Leon. It is located 26 kilometres (16 mi) from the provincial capital city of Salamanca and has a population of 242 people.

== Geography ==
The municipality covers an area of nine square kilometres (3.5 sq mi).

== See also ==
- List of municipalities in Salamanca
