= El Pino de Tormes =

- Municipality
- Coat of arms

- Location in Salamanca

- Location in Spain
- Coordinates: 41°02′24″N 5°47′34″W
- Country: Spain
- Autonomous community: Castile and León
- Province: Salamanca
- Comarca: Campo de Salamanca

Government
  - Mayor: Martín Hernández (People's Party)

Area
  - Total: 21 km^{2} (8.1 sq mi)
- Elevation: 770 m (2,530 ft)

Population (2025-01-01)
  - Total: 147
  - Density: 7.0/km^{2} (18/sq mi)
- Time zone: UTC+1 (CET)
  - Summer (DST): UTC+2 (CEST)
- Postal code: 37170

El Pino de Tormes is a village and municipality in the province of Salamanca, western Spain, part of the autonomous community of Castile-Leon. It is located 19 kilometres (12 mi) from the provincial capital city of Salamanca and has a population of 157 people.

== Geography ==
The municipality covers an area of 21 km^{2} (8.1 sq mi).

It lies 770 metres (2,530 ft) above sea level and the postal code is 37170.

== See also ==
- List of municipalities in Salamanca
