= Narros de Matalayegua =

- Municipality
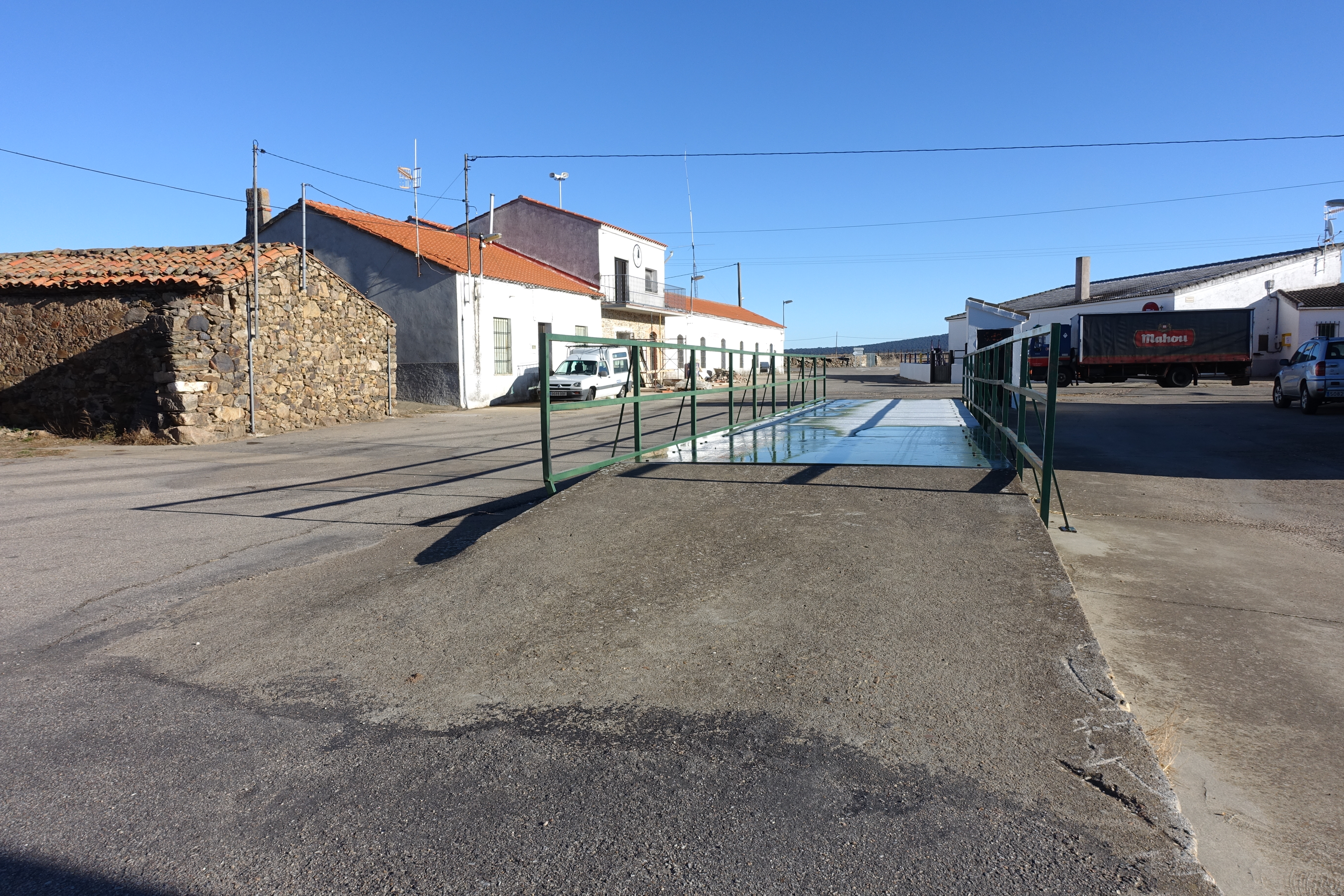

- Location in Salamanca

- Location in Spain
- Coordinates: 40°41′55″N 5°55′40″W
- Country: Spain
- Autonomous community: Castile and León
- Province: Salamanca
- Comarca: Campo de Salamanca

Government
  - Mayor: Dolores Gabriela Alonso Mulas (People's Party)

Area
  - Total: 74 km^{2} (29 sq mi)
- Elevation: 990 m (3,250 ft)

Population (2025-01-01)
  - Total: 187
  - Density: 2.5/km^{2} (6.5/sq mi)
- Time zone: UTC+1 (CET)
  - Summer (DST): UTC+2 (CEST)
- Postal code: 37455

Narros de Matalayegua is a village and large municipality in the province of Salamanca, western Spain, part of the autonomous community of Castile-Leon. It is located 42 kilometres (26 mi) from the provincial capital city of Salamanca and has a population of 238 people.

== Geography ==
The municipality covers an area of 74 km^{2} (29 sq mi). It lies 990 metres (3,250 ft) above sea level and postal code is 37455.

== See also ==
- List of municipalities in Salamanca
