= Pitiegua =

- Municipality
- Coat of arms

- Location in Salamanca

- Location in Spain
- Coordinates: 41°03′45″N 5°27′58″W
- Country: Spain
- Autonomous community: Castile and León
- Province: Salamanca
- Comarca: La Armuña

Government
  - Mayor: Julio Marcos (People's Party)

Area
  - Total: 20 km^{2} (7.7 sq mi)
- Elevation: 843 m (2,766 ft)

Population (2025-01-01)
  - Total: 173
  - Density: 8.6/km^{2} (22/sq mi)
- Time zone: UTC+1 (CET)
  - Summer (DST): UTC+2 (CEST)
- Postal code: 37490

Pitiegua is a municipality located in the province of Salamanca, Castile and León, Spain. As of 2016, the municipality has a population of 196 inhabitants (INE).
