= Aldehuela de la Bóveda =

- Municipality
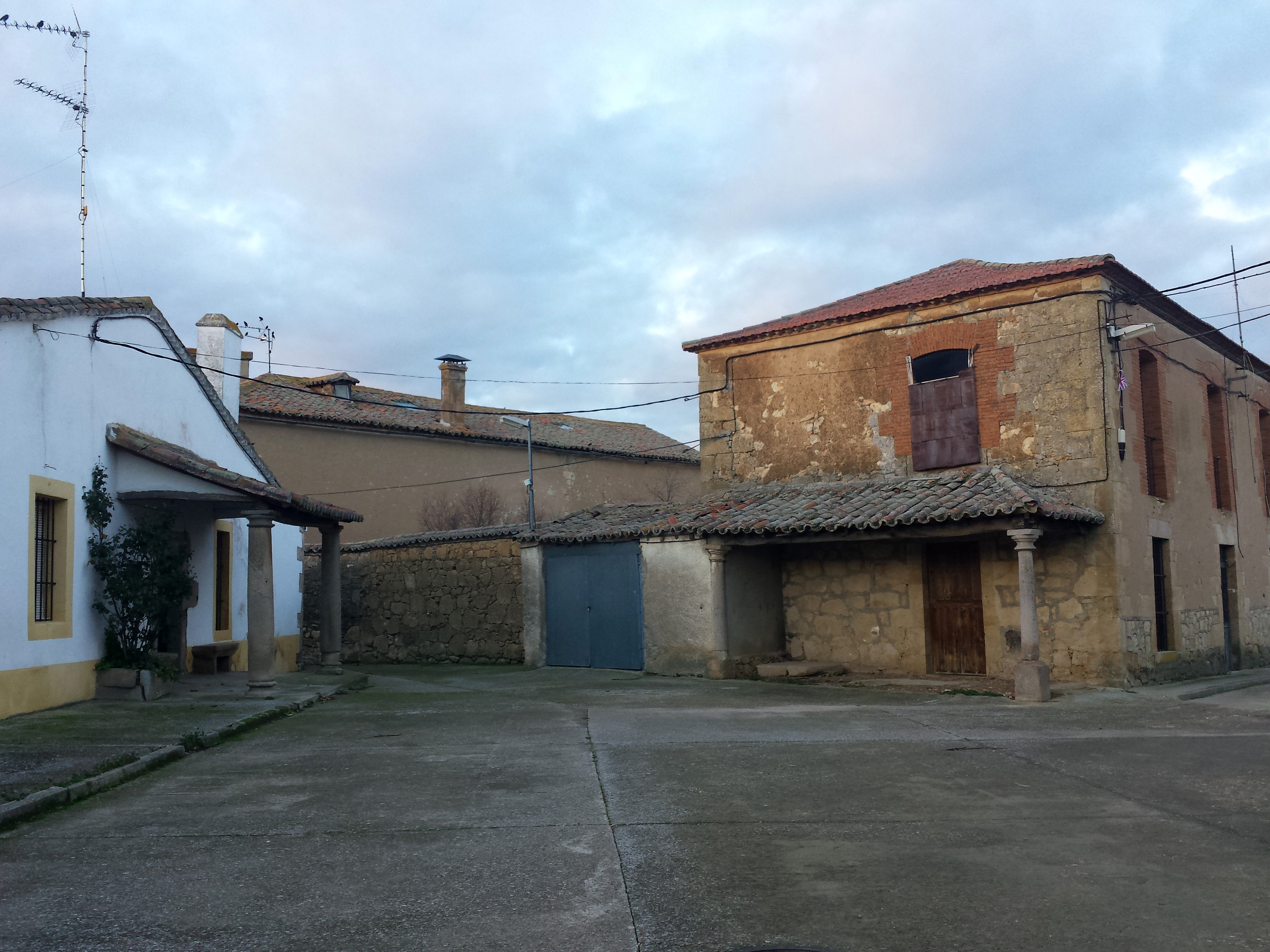

- Coat of arms

- Location in Salamanca
- Coordinates: 40°50′40″N 6°02′55″W
- Country: Spain
- Autonomous community: Castile and León
- Province: Salamanca
- Comarca: Campo de Salamanca

Government
  - Mayor: José Manuel Moñita García (PSOE)

Area
  - Total: 71 km^{2} (27 sq mi)
- Elevation: 792 m (2,598 ft)

Population (2025-01-01)
  - Total: 260
  - Density: 3.7/km^{2} (9.5/sq mi)
- Time zone: UTC+1 (CET)
  - Summer (DST): UTC+2 (CEST)
- Postal code: 37460

Aldehuela de la Bóveda is a village and municipality in the province of Salamanca, western Spain, part of the autonomous community of Castile and León. It is located 35 kilometres (22 mi) west of the city of Salamanca and has a population of 284 people as of 2016.
