= Carrascal de Barregas =

- Municipality
- Coat of arms

- Location in Salamanca

- Location in Spain
- Coordinates: 40°58′41″N 5°45′45″W
- Country: Spain
- Autonomous community: Castile and León
- Province: Salamanca
- Comarca: Campo de Salamanca

Government
  - Mayor: Cándido Cabezas Martínez (Union, Progress and Democracy)

Area
  - Total: 76.6 km^{2} (29.6 sq mi)
- Elevation: 797 m (2,615 ft)

Population (2025-01-01)
  - Total: 1,456
  - Density: 19.0/km^{2} (49.2/sq mi)
- Time zone: UTC+1 (CET)
  - Summer (DST): UTC+2 (CEST)
- Postal code: 37129
- Website: www.carrascaldebarregas.com

Carrascal de Barregas is a village and municipality in the province of Salamanca, western Spain, part of the autonomous community of Castile-Leon. It is located 10 kilometres (6.2 mi) from the city of Salamanca and as of 2016 has a population of 1,117 people. The municipality covers an area of 77 km^{2} (30 sq mi).

The village lies 797 metres (2,615 ft) above sea level.
