= Tardáguila =

- Municipality
- Coat of arms

- Location in Salamanca

- Location in Spain
- Coordinates: 41°06′53″N 5°34′32″W
- Country: Spain
- Autonomous community: Castile and León
- Province: Salamanca
- Comarca: La Armuña

Government
  - Mayor: José Roque (People's Party)

Area
  - Total: 25 km^{2} (9.7 sq mi)
- Elevation: 834 m (2,736 ft)

Population (2025-01-01)
  - Total: 193
  - Density: 7.7/km^{2} (20/sq mi)
- Time zone: UTC+1 (CET)
  - Summer (DST): UTC+2 (CEST)
- Postal code: 37429

Tardáguila is a municipality located in the province of Salamanca, Castile and León, Spain. As of 2016 the municipality has a population of 221 inhabitants.
