= Las Veguillas =

- Municipality
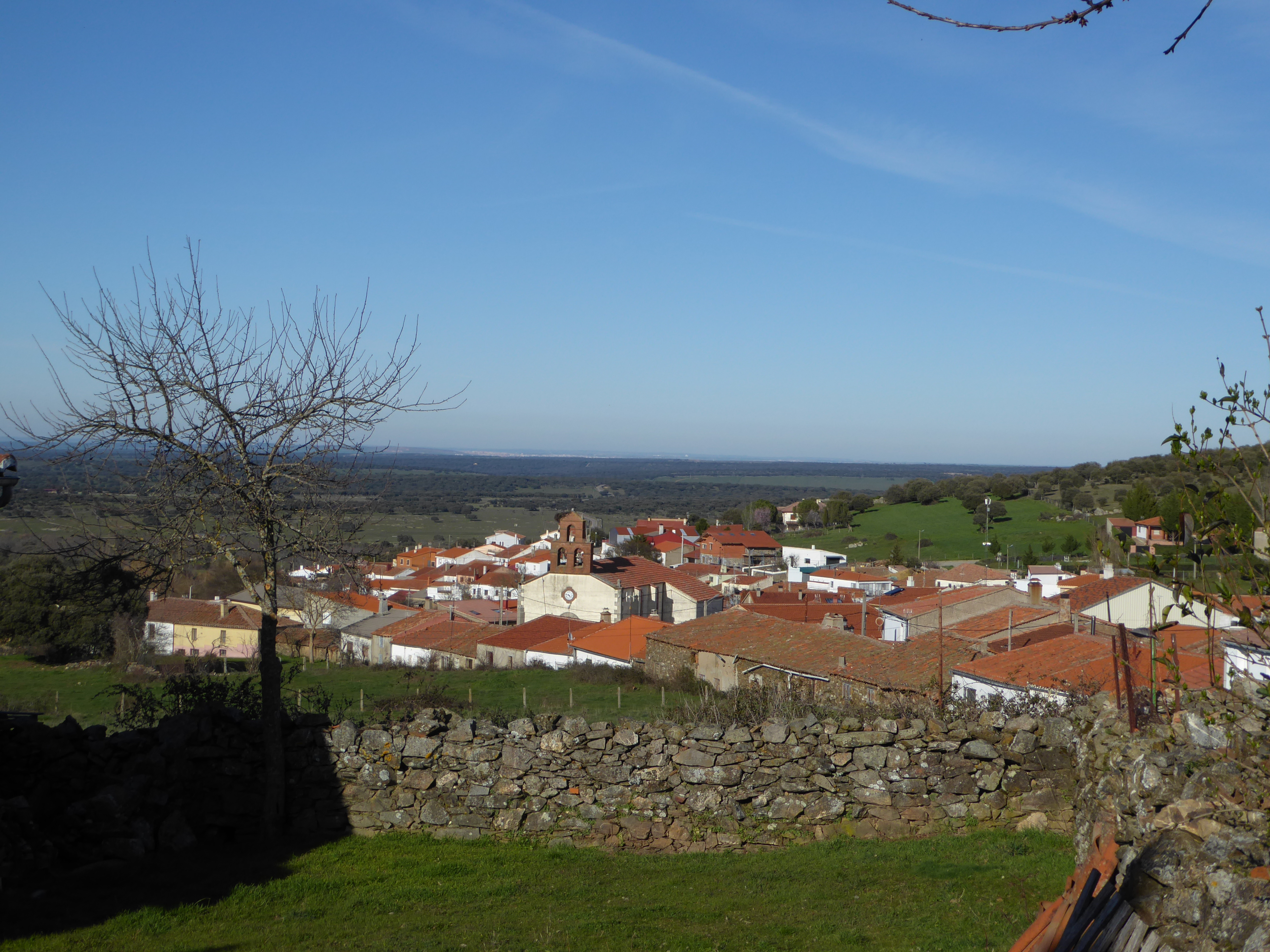

- Coat of arms

- Location in Salamanca

- Location in Spain
- Coordinates: 40°42′59″N 5°49′52″W
- Country: Spain
- Autonomous community: Castile and León
- Province: Salamanca
- Comarca: Campo de Salamanca

Government
  - Mayor: José Sánchez (People's Party)

Area
  - Total: 44 km^{2} (17 sq mi)
- Elevation: 1,050 m (3,440 ft)

Population (2025-01-01)
  - Total: 275
  - Density: 6.2/km^{2} (16/sq mi)
- Time zone: UTC+1 (CET)
  - Summer (DST): UTC+2 (CEST)
- Postal code: 37454

Las Veguillas is a village and municipality in the province of Salamanca, western Spain, part of the autonomous community of Castile-Leon. It is located 31 kilometres (19 mi) from the provincial capital city of Salamanca and has a population of 297 people.

== Geography ==
The municipality covers an area of 44 km^{2} (17 sq mi). It lies 1,050 metres (3,440 ft) above sea level and the postal code is 37454.

== See also ==
- List of municipalities in Salamanca
