= Alaraz =

- Municipality
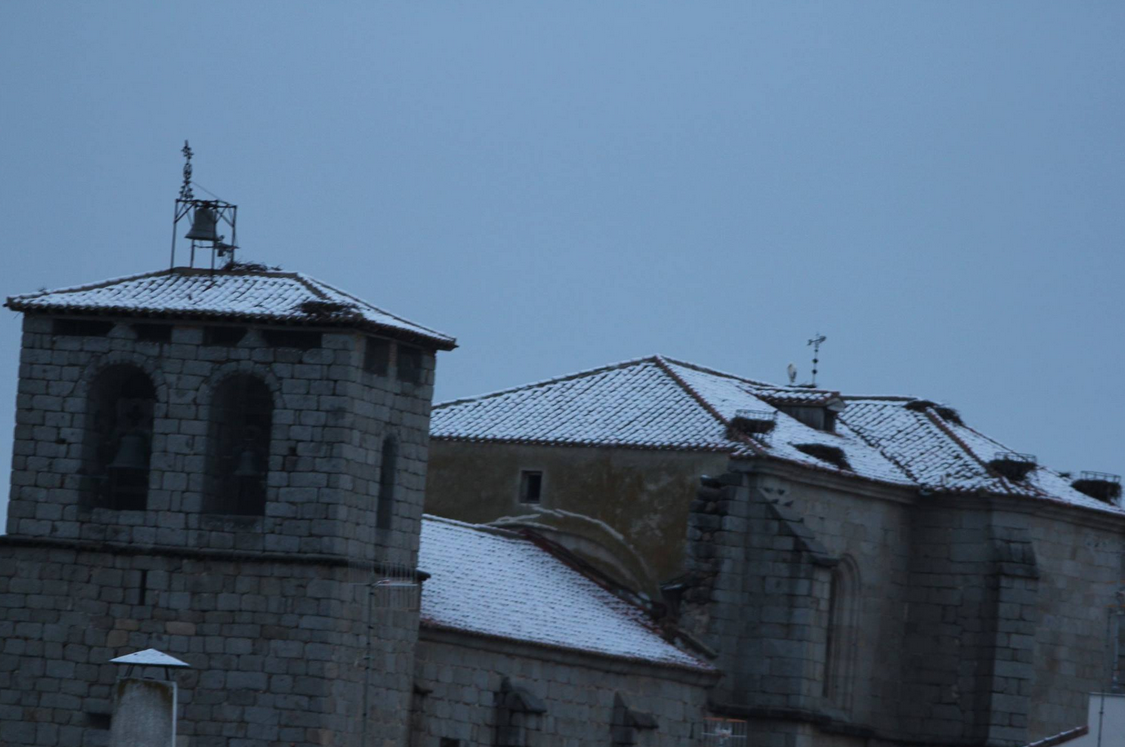
- Church

- Flag Coat of arms

- Alaraz municipality
- Coordinates: 40°45′N 5°17′W
- Country: Spain
- Autonomous community: Castile and León
- Province: Salamanca
- Comarca: Tierra de Peñaranda

Government
  - Mayor: Clemente Bautista Corral (People's Party)

Area
  - Total: 49.17 km^{2} (18.98 sq mi)
- Elevation: 844 m (2,769 ft)

Population (2025-01-01)
  - Total: 444
  - Density: 9.03/km^{2} (23.4/sq mi)
- Time zone: UTC+1 (CET)
  - Summer (DST): UTC+2 (CEST)

Alaraz is a village and municipality in the south-east of the province of Salamanca, western Spain, part of the autonomous community of Castile and León. It is located 40 kilometres (25 mi) from the capital city of Salamanca.
