= San Muñoz =

- municipality
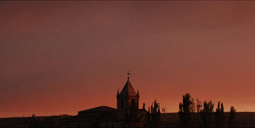

- Flag Coat of arms

- Location in Salamanca

- Location in Spain
- Coordinates: 40°46′56″N 6°07′38″W
- Country: Spain
- Autonomous community: Castile and León
- Province: Salamanca
- Comarca: Campo de Salamanca

Government
  - Mayor: Ildefonso Bernal Rodríguez (People's Party)

Area
  - Total: 54 km^{2} (21 sq mi)
- Elevation: 785 m (2,575 ft)

Population (2025-01-01)
  - Total: 192
  - Density: 3.6/km^{2} (9.2/sq mi)
- Time zone: UTC+1 (CET)
  - Summer (DST): UTC+2 (CEST)
- Postal code: 37208

San Muñoz is a municipality located in the province of Salamanca, Castile and León, Spain. As of 2016 the municipality has a population of 253 inhabitants.
