= Peñacaballera =

- Municipality
- Flag Coat of arms

- Location in Salamanca

- Location in Spain
- Coordinates: 40°20′39″N 5°51′38″W
- Country: Spain
- Autonomous community: Castile and León
- Province: Salamanca
- Comarca: Sierra de Béjar

Government
  - Mayor: Javier Valencia (People's Party)

Area
  - Total: 6 km^{2} (2.3 sq mi)
- Elevation: 880 m (2,890 ft)

Population (2025-01-01)
  - Total: 149
  - Density: 25/km^{2} (64/sq mi)
- Time zone: UTC+1 (CET)
  - Summer (DST): UTC+2 (CEST)
- Postal code: 37728

Peñacaballera is a municipality located in the province of Salamanca, Castile and León, Spain. As of 2016 the municipality has a population of 149 inhabitants.
