= Parada de Arriba =

- Municipality
- Flag Coat of arms

- Location in Salamanca

- Location in Spain
- Coordinates: 40°59′13″N 5°47′34″W
- Country: Spain
- Autonomous community: Castile and León
- Province: Salamanca
- Comarca: Campo de Salamanca

Government
  - Mayor: Marcos Pérez (PSOE)

Area
  - Total: 18 km^{2} (6.9 sq mi)
- Elevation: 824 m (2,703 ft)

Population (2025-01-01)
  - Total: 264
  - Density: 15/km^{2} (38/sq mi)
- Time zone: UTC+1 (CET)
  - Summer (DST): UTC+2 (CEST)
- Postal code: 37129

Parada de Arriba is a municipality located in the province of Salamanca, Castile and León, Spain. As of 2016 the municipality has a population of 268 inhabitants.
