= Villalba de los Llanos =

- Municipality
- Coat of arms

- Location in Salamanca

- Location in Spain
- Coordinates: 40°48′03″N 5°58′23″W
- Country: Spain
- Autonomous community: Castile and León
- Province: Salamanca
- Comarca: Campo de Salamanca

Government
  - Mayor: Jesús Camilo Castaño Benito (People's Party)

Area
  - Total: 37 km^{2} (14 sq mi)
- Elevation: 835 m (2,740 ft)

Population (2025-01-01)
  - Total: 107
  - Density: 2.9/km^{2} (7.5/sq mi)
- Time zone: UTC+1 (CET)
  - Summer (DST): UTC+2 (CEST)
- Postal code: 37451

Villalba de los Llanos is a municipality located in the province of Salamanca, Castile and León, Spain. As of 2016 the municipality has a population of 138 inhabitants.
