= Torresmenudas =

Coordinates: 41°06′N 5°47′W

- Municipality
- Coat of arms

- Location in Salamanca
- Country: Spain
- Autonomous community: Castile and León
- Province: Salamanca
- Comarca: La Armuña

Government
  - Alcalde (Mayor): Hilario Hernández Cirilo (People's Party)

Area
  - Total: 12 km^{2} (4.6 sq mi)
- Elevation: 787 m (2,582 ft)

Population (2025-01-01)
  - Total: 192
  - Density: 16/km^{2} (41/sq mi)
- Time zone: UTC+1 (CET)
  - Summer (DST): UTC+2 (CEST)

Torresmenudas is a municipality located in the province of Salamanca, Castile and León, Spain. According to the 2016 census (INE), the municipality has a population of 198 inhabitants.
