= Arcediano =

- Municipality
- Location in Salamanca

- Location in Spain
- Coordinates: 41°05′36″N 5°33′37″W
- Country: Spain
- Autonomous community: Castile and León
- Province: Salamanca
- Comarca: La Armuña

Government
  - Mayor: María del Pilar Rodrigo Velasco (People's Party)

Area
  - Total: 11 km^{2} (4.2 sq mi)
- Elevation: 825 m (2,707 ft)

Population (2025-01-01)
  - Total: 89
  - Density: 8.1/km^{2} (21/sq mi)
- Time zone: UTC+1 (CET)
  - Summer (DST): UTC+2 (CEST)
- Postal code: 37429

Arcediano is a village and municipality in the province of Salamanca, western Spain, part of the autonomous community of Castile and León. It is located 16 kilometres (9.9 mi) from the city of Salamanca and has a population of 113 people. The municipality has an area of 11 km^{2} (4.2 sq mi).

The village lies 825 metres (2,707 ft) above sea level.
