= Valdemierque =

- Municipality
- Location in Salamanca
- Coordinates: 40°49′17″N 5°35′0″W
- Country: Spain
- Autonomous community: Castile and León
- Province: Salamanca
- Comarca: Tierra de Alba

Government
  - Mayor: Luis García Hernández (PSOE)

Area
  - Total: 17 km^{2} (6.6 sq mi)
- Elevation: 936 m (3,071 ft)

Population (2025-01-01)
  - Total: 58
  - Density: 3.4/km^{2} (8.8/sq mi)
- Time zone: UTC+1 (CET)
  - Summer (DST): UTC+2 (CEST)
- Postal code: 37893

Valdemierque is a municipality located in the province of Salamanca, Castile and León, Spain. As of 2016 the municipality has a population of 61 inhabitants.
