= Tejeda y Segoyuela =

- Municipality
- Location in Salamanca

- Location in Spain
- Coordinates: 40°37′56″N 6°01′21″W
- Country: Spain
- Autonomous community: Castile and León
- Province: Salamanca
- Comarca: Campo de Salamanca

Government
  - Mayor: Santiago Martín Varas (People's Party)

Area
  - Total: 44 km^{2} (17 sq mi)
- Elevation: 927 m (3,041 ft)

Population (2025-01-01)
  - Total: 97
  - Density: 2.2/km^{2} (5.7/sq mi)
- Time zone: UTC+1 (CET)
  - Summer (DST): UTC+2 (CEST)
- Postal code: 37608

Tejeda y Segoyuela is a municipality located in the province of Salamanca, Castile and León, Spain. As of 2016, the municipality has a population of 99 inhabitants.
