= Santiz =

- Municipality
- Flag Coat of arms

- Location in Salamanca

- Location in Spain
- Coordinates: 41°12′20″N 5°53′37″W
- Country: Spain
- Autonomous community: Castile and León
- Province: Salamanca
- Comarca: Tierra de Ledesma

Government
  - Mayor: Manuel Hernández Sánchez (People's Party)

Area
  - Total: 27 km^{2} (10 sq mi)
- Elevation: 893 m (2,930 ft)

Population (2025-01-01)
  - Total: 225
  - Density: 8.3/km^{2} (22/sq mi)
- Time zone: UTC+1 (CET)
  - Summer (DST): UTC+2 (CEST)
- Postal code: 37110

Santiz is a municipality located in the province of Salamanca, Castile and León, Spain. As of 2016 the municipality has a population of 250 inhabitants.
