= Aldeatejada =

- Municipality
- Coat of arms

- Location in Salamanca

- Location in Spain
- Coordinates: 40°55′24″N 5°41′33″W
- Country: Spain
- Autonomous community: Castile and León
- Province: Salamanca
- Comarca: Campo de Salamanca

Government
  - Mayor: Herminio Felicio Velasco Marcos (People's Party)

Area
  - Total: 32 km^{2} (12 sq mi)
- Elevation: 792 m (2,598 ft)

Population (2025-01-01)
  - Total: 2,662
  - Density: 83/km^{2} (220/sq mi)
- Time zone: UTC+1 (CET)
  - Summer (DST): UTC+2 (CEST)
- Postal code: 37187
- Website: www.aldeatejada.es/

Aldeatejada is a village and municipality in the province of Salamanca, western Spain, part of the autonomous community of Castile and León.

== Geography ==
It is located only 6 kilometres (3.7 mi) from the city of Salamanca and as of 2016 there are 1,828 inhabitants.

The village lies 792 metres (2,598 ft) above sea level on rural farmland. The nearest village geographically is Vistaahermosa although lack of direct road connections means that the village is almost twice the distance away by road from Salamanca.

== Demography ==
At present the village lies within a certain demographic prosperity within reach of the provincial capital, but increased urban sprawl in recent years may mean that the village may become merged with the Salamanca conurbation in coming decades. In the time period of 15 years the population has nearly doubled between 1991 and 2006 with a population of 516 people in 1991 growing to an estimated 935 people in 2006.

Historical population

Year	Pop.	±%
1991 (Note: census official)	516	—
2001	696	+34.9%
2003	716	+2.9%

Year	Pop.	±%
2004	800	+11.7%
2006	935	+16.9%
