= Barbalos =

- Municipality
- Location in Salamanca

- Location in Spain
- Coordinates: 40°40′37″N 5°56′35″W
- Country: Spain
- Autonomous community: Castile and León
- Province: Salamanca
- Comarca: Campo de Salamanca

Government
  - Mayor: Bernardino Fernando Martín García (People's Party)

Area
  - Total: 38 km^{2} (15 sq mi)
- Elevation: 925 m (3,035 ft)

Population (2025-01-01)
  - Total: 70
  - Density: 1.8/km^{2} (4.8/sq mi)
- Time zone: UTC+1 (CET)
  - Summer (DST): UTC+2 (CEST)
- Postal code: 37455

Barbalos is a village and municipality in the province of Salamanca, western Spain, part of the autonomous community of Castile-Leon. It is located 45 kilometres (28 mi) from the city of Salamanca and has a population of 78 people. The municipality covers an area of 38 km^{2} (15 sq mi).

The village lies 915 metres (3,002 ft) above sea level.

The postal code is 37455.
