= Buenamadre =

- Municipality
- Coat of arms

- Location in Salamanca

- Location in Spain
- Coordinates: 40°52′N 6°15′W
- Country: Spain
- Autonomous community: Castile and León
- Province: Salamanca
- Comarca: Campo de Salamanca

Government
  - Mayor: Adolfo Sánchez Oviedo (People's Party)

Area
  - Total: 59.24 km^{2} (22.87 sq mi)
- Elevation: 750 m (2,460 ft)

Population (2025-01-01)
  - Total: 108
  - Density: 1.82/km^{2} (4.72/sq mi)
- Time zone: UTC+1 (CET)
  - Summer (DST): UTC+2 (CEST)
- Postal code: 37209

Buenamadre (English literally Good mother) is a village and municipality in the province of Salamanca, western Spain, part of the autonomous community of Castile-Leon. It is 60 kilometres (37 mi) from the provincial capital city of Salamanca and has a population of 170 people.

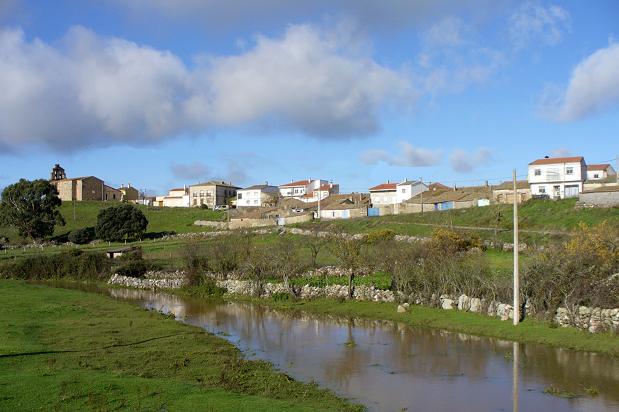
River Tumbafrailes passing Buenamadre.
