= Valdelosa =

- Municipality
- Flag Coat of arms

- Location in Salamanca

- Location in Spain
- Coordinates: 41°10′15″N 5°46′58″W
- Country: Spain
- Autonomous community: Castile and León
- Province: Salamanca
- Comarca: Tierra de Ledesma

Government
  - Mayor: Manuel Prada Sánchez (People's Party)

Area
  - Total: 63 km^{2} (24 sq mi)
- Elevation: 842 m (2,762 ft)

Population (2025-01-01)
  - Total: 386
  - Density: 6.1/km^{2} (16/sq mi)
- Time zone: UTC+1 (CET)
  - Summer (DST): UTC+2 (CEST)
- Postal code: 37799

Valdelosa is a municipality located in the province of Salamanca, Castile and León, Spain. As of 2016 the municipality has a population of 443 inhabitants.
