= Morille =

- municipality
- Flag Coat of arms

- Location in Salamanca

- Location in Spain
- Coordinates: 40°48′22″N 5°41′51″W
- Country: Spain
- Autonomous community: Castile and León
- Province: Salamanca
- Comarca: Campo de Salamanca

Government
  - Mayor: Manuel Ambrosio Sánchez (Spanish Socialist Workers' Party)

Area
  - Total: 23 km^{2} (8.9 sq mi)
- Elevation: 937 m (3,074 ft)

Population (2025-01-01)
  - Total: 221
  - Density: 9.6/km^{2} (25/sq mi)
- Time zone: UTC+1 (CET)
  - Summer (DST): UTC+2 (CEST)
- Postal code: 37183
- Website: www.morille.es

Morille is a municipality located in the province of Salamanca, Castile and León, Spain. As of 2016 the municipality has a population of 254 inhabitants.
