= Navalmoral de Béjar =

- Municipality
- Location in Salamanca

- Location in Spain
- Coordinates: 40°25′19″N 5°46′38″W
- Country: Spain
- Autonomous community: Castile and León
- Province: Salamanca
- Comarca: Sierra de Béjar

Government
  - Mayor: María Azucena Bonafonte André (INB)

Area
  - Total: 11 km^{2} (4.2 sq mi)
- Elevation: 934 m (3,064 ft)

Population (2025-01-01)
  - Total: 57
  - Density: 5.2/km^{2} (13/sq mi)
- Time zone: UTC+1 (CET)
  - Summer (DST): UTC+2 (CEST)
- Postal code: 37793

Navalmoral de Béjar is a municipality located in the province of Salamanca, Castile and León, As of 2016, the municipality has a population of 66 inhabitants.
