= Carrascal del Obispo =

- Municipality
- Coat of arms

- Location in Salamanca

- Location in Spain
- Coordinates: 40°45′49″N 5°59′57″W
- Country: Spain
- Autonomous community: Castile and León
- Province: Salamanca
- Comarca: Campo de Salamanca

Government
  - Mayor: Manuel Martín Rodríguez (Spanish Socialist Workers' Party)

Area
  - Total: 41 km^{2} (16 sq mi)
- Elevation: 903 m (2,963 ft)

Population (2025-01-01)
  - Total: 185
  - Density: 4.5/km^{2} (12/sq mi)
- Time zone: UTC+1 (CET)
  - Summer (DST): UTC+2 (CEST)
- Postal code: 37451

Carrascal del Obispo is a village and municipality in the province of Salamanca, Spain, part of the autonomous community of Castile-Leon. It is located 45 kilometres (28 mi) from the city of Salamanca and as of 2016 has a population of 222 people. The municipality covers an area of 41 km^{2} (16 sq mi).

The village lies 903 metres (2,963 ft) above sea level and the postal code is 37451.
