= Armenteros =

Armenteros, Spain
- Municipality
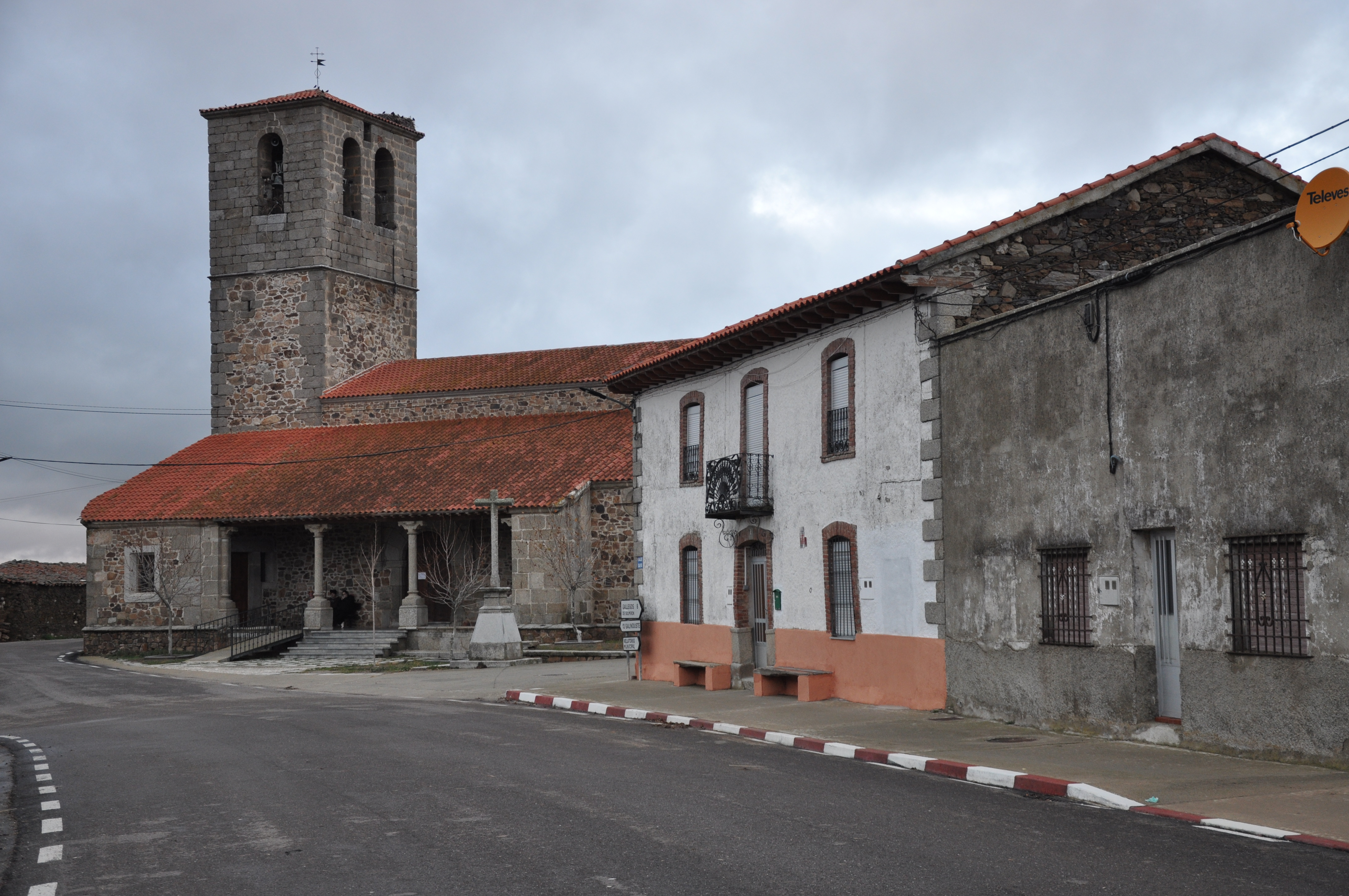
- Parish Church of Our Lady of the Rosary in Armenteros

- Coat of arms

- Armenteros municipality
- Coordinates: 40°36′N 5°27′W
- Country: Spain
- Autonomous community: Castile and León
- Province: Salamanca
- Comarca: Tierra de Alba

Government
  - Mayor: Juan Blázquez Dominguez (People's Party)

Area
  - Total: 39 km^{2} (15 sq mi)
- Elevation: 1,065 m (3,494 ft)

Population (2025-01-01)
  - Total: 156
  - Density: 4.0/km^{2} (10/sq mi)
- Time zone: UTC+1 (CET)
  - Summer (DST): UTC+2 (CEST)
- Postal code: 37755

Armenteros is a village and municipality in the province of Salamanca, western Spain, part of the autonomous community of Castile-Leon. It is located 52 kilometres (32 mi) from the city of Salamanca and has a population of 238 people. The municipality covers an area of 39 km^{2} (15 sq mi) and comprises the villages of Armenteros (capital), Revalvos, Íñigo Blasco, Navahombela and Pedro Fuertes

The village lies 1,065 metres (3,494 ft) above sea level.

The postal code is 37755.
