= Cristóbal de la Sierra =

- municipality
- Flag Coat of arms

- Location in Salamanca

- Location in Spain
- Coordinates: 40°27′55″N 5°54′38″W
- Country: Spain
- Autonomous community: Castile and León
- Province: Salamanca
- Comarca: Sierra de Béjar

Government
  - Mayor: Antonio Luengo (Spanish Socialist Workers' Party)

Area
  - Total: 22 km^{2} (8.5 sq mi)
- Elevation: 868 m (2,848 ft)

Population (2025-01-01)
  - Total: 158
  - Density: 7.2/km^{2} (19/sq mi)
- Time zone: UTC+1 (CET)
  - Summer (DST): UTC+2 (CEST)
- Postal code: 37684
- Website: www.aytocristobal.com

Cristóbal de la Sierra is a village and large municipality in the province of Salamanca, western Spain, part of the autonomous community of Castile-Leon.
