= Nava de Béjar =

- Municipality
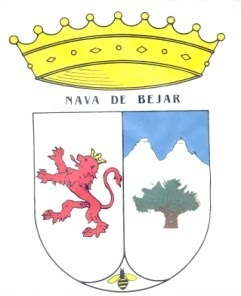
- Coat of arms

- Location in Salamanca

- Location in Spain
- Coordinates: 40°28′30″N 5°40′40″W
- Country: Spain
- Autonomous community: Castile and León
- Province: Salamanca
- Comarca: Sierra de Béjar

Government
  - Mayor: Jesús Sánchez (People's Party)

Area
  - Total: 12 km^{2} (4.6 sq mi)
- Elevation: 1,054 m (3,458 ft)

Population (2025-01-01)
  - Total: 74
  - Density: 6.2/km^{2} (16/sq mi)
- Time zone: UTC+1 (CET)
  - Summer (DST): UTC+2 (CEST)
- Postal code: 37776
- Website: aytonavadebejar.weebly.com

Nava de Béjar is a municipality located in the province of Salamanca, Castile and León, Spain. As of 2016 the municipality has a population of 99 inhabitants.
