= Sanchotello =

- Municipality
- Flag Coat of arms

- Location in Salamanca

- Location in Spain
- Coordinates: 40°26′17″N 5°45′10″W
- Country: Spain
- Autonomous community: Castile and León
- Province: Salamanca
- Comarca: Sierra de Béjar

Government
  - Mayor: Fernando Balsa (People's Party)

Area
  - Total: 14 km^{2} (5.4 sq mi)
- Elevation: 936 m (3,071 ft)

Population (2025-01-01)
  - Total: 206
  - Density: 15/km^{2} (38/sq mi)
- Time zone: UTC+1 (CET)
  - Summer (DST): UTC+2 (CEST)
- Postal code: 37794

Sanchotello is a municipality located in the province of Salamanca, Castile and León, Spain. As of 2016 the municipality has a population of 227 inhabitants.
