= Beleña =

- Municipality
- Location in Salamanca

- Location in Spain
- Coordinates: 40°45′04″N 5°37′39″W
- Country: Spain
- Autonomous community: Castile and León
- Province: Salamanca
- Comarca: Tierra de Alba

Government
  - Mayor: Alberto Rodríguez Boyero (People's Party)

Area
  - Total: 27 km^{2} (10 sq mi)
- Elevation: 880 m (2,890 ft)

Population (2025-01-01)
  - Total: 258
  - Density: 9.6/km^{2} (25/sq mi)
- Time zone: UTC+1 (CET)
  - Summer (DST): UTC+2 (CEST)
- Postal code: 37789

Beleña is a municipality located in the province of Salamanca, Castile and León, Spain.
