= Zamayón =

- Municipality
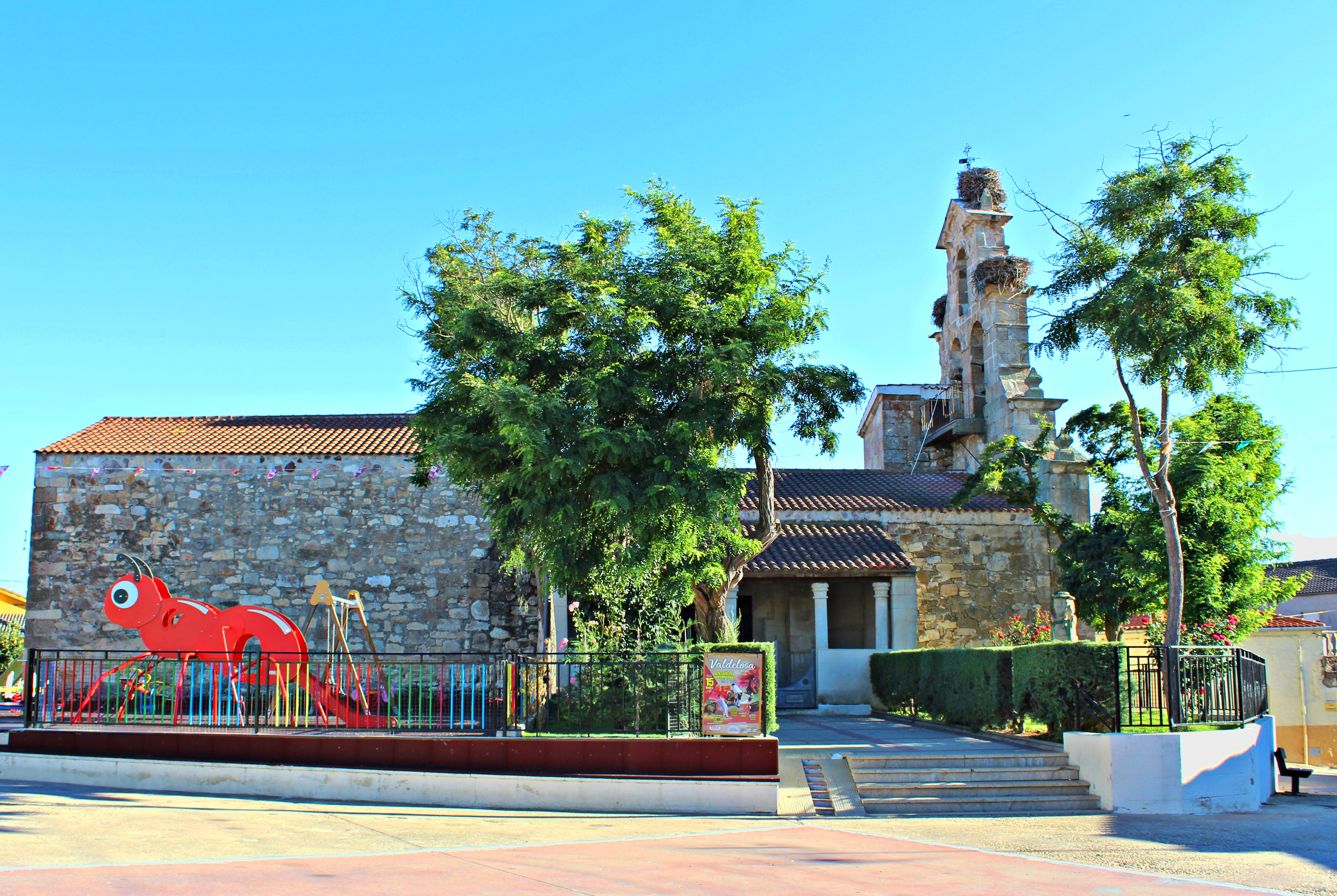
- Church in Zamayón

- Coat of arms

- Location in Salamanca

- Location in Spain
- Coordinates: 41°8′54″N 5°49′49″W
- Country: Spain
- Community: Castile and León
- Province: Salamanca
- Comarca: Tierra de Ledesma

Government
  - Mayor: Ángel Luis del Arco Vicente (PSOE)

Area
  - Total: 30.90 km^{2} (11.93 sq mi)
- Elevation: 811 m (2,661 ft)

Population (2025-01-01)
  - Total: 192
  - Density: 6.21/km^{2} (16.1/sq mi)
- Time zone: UTC+1 (CET)
  - Summer (DST): UTC+2 (CEST)
- Postal code: 37110

Zamayón is a municipality located in the province of Salamanca, Castile and León, Spain.
