= Villasdardo =

- Municipality
- Location in Salamanca

- Location in Spain
- Coordinates: 41°00′16″N 6°09′47″W
- Country: Spain
- Autonomous community: Castile and León
- Province: Salamanca
- Comarca: Tierra de Ledesma

Government
  - Mayor: Alicia Pérez Sánchez (People's Party)

Area
  - Total: 22 km^{2} (8.5 sq mi)
- Elevation: 807 m (2,648 ft)

Population (2025-01-01)
  - Total: 22
  - Density: 1.0/km^{2} (2.6/sq mi)
- Time zone: UTC+1 (CET)
  - Summer (DST): UTC+2 (CEST)
- Postal code: 37468

Villasdardo is a municipality located in the province of Salamanca, Castile and León, Spain. As of 2016 the municipality had a population of 17 inhabitants.
