= Gajates =

- Municipality
- Coat of arms

- Location in Salamanca

- Location in Spain
- Coordinates: 40°46′58″N 5°22′01″W
- Country: Spain
- Autonomous community: Castile and León
- Province: Salamanca
- Comarca: Tierra de Alba

Government
  - Mayor: Mari Mar Carabias Sánchez (PSOE)

Area
  - Total: 28 km^{2} (11 sq mi)
- Elevation: 853 m (2,799 ft)

Population (2025-01-01)
  - Total: 135
  - Density: 4.8/km^{2} (12/sq mi)
- Time zone: UTC+1 (CET)
  - Summer (DST): UTC+2 (CEST)
- Postal code: 37874

Gajates is a municipality located in the province of Salamanca, Castile and León, Spain.
