= Peromingo =

- Municipality
- Location in Salamanca

- Location in Spain
- Coordinates: 40°27′52″N 5°46′21″W
- Country: Spain
- Autonomous community: Castile and León
- Province: Salamanca
- Comarca: Sierra de Béjar

Government
  - Mayor: Pedro Saturnino Blanco Martín (People's Party)

Area
  - Total: 9 km^{2} (3.5 sq mi)
- Elevation: 794 m (2,605 ft)

Population (2025-01-01)
  - Total: 121
  - Density: 13/km^{2} (35/sq mi)
- Time zone: UTC+1 (CET)
  - Summer (DST): UTC+2 (CEST)
- Postal code: 37791

Peromingo is a municipality located in the province of Salamanca, Castile and León, Spain. As of 2016 the municipality has a population of 131 inhabitants.
