= Pelarrodríguez =

- Municipality
- Location in Salamanca

- Location in Spain
- Coordinates: 40°53′15″N 6°12′46″W
- Country: Spain
- Autonomous community: Castile and León
- Province: Salamanca
- Comarca: Campo de Salamanca

Government
  - Mayor: Tomas Martín Salvador (People's Party)

Area
  - Total: 15 km^{2} (5.8 sq mi)
- Elevation: 759 m (2,490 ft)

Population (2025-01-01)
  - Total: 161
  - Density: 11/km^{2} (28/sq mi)
- Time zone: UTC+1 (CET)
  - Summer (DST): UTC+2 (CEST)
- Postal code: 37209

Pelarrodríguez is a municipality located in the province of Salamanca, Castile and León, Spain. As of 2016 the municipality has a population of 165 inhabitants.
