= Mozárbez =

- municipality
- Coat of arms

- Location in Salamanca

- Location in Spain
- Coordinates: 40°51′28″N 5°39′05″W
- Country: Spain
- Autonomous community: Castile and León
- Province: Salamanca
- Comarca: Campo de Salamanca

Government
  - Mayor: Fermín Pérez Benito (Spanish Socialist Workers' Party)

Area
  - Total: 45 km^{2} (17 sq mi)
- Elevation: 875 m (2,871 ft)

Population (2025-01-01)
  - Total: 510
  - Density: 11/km^{2} (29/sq mi)
- Time zone: UTC+1 (CET)
  - Summer (DST): UTC+2 (CEST)
- Postal code: 37183
- Website: mozarbez.com

Mozárbez (Spanish pronunciation: [mo.ˈθaɾ.βeθ]) is a municipality located in the province of Salamanca, Castile and León, Spain. As of 2016 the municipality has a population of 502 inhabitants.
