= Miranda de Azán =

- municipality
- Flag Coat of arms

- Location in Salamanca

- Location in Spain
- Coordinates: 40°53′14″N 5°40′53″W
- Country: Spain
- Autonomous community: Castile and León
- Province: Salamanca
- Comarca: Campo de Salamanca

Government
  - Mayor: David García (United Left)

Area
  - Total: 24 km^{2} (9.3 sq mi)
- Elevation: 823 m (2,700 ft)

Population (2025-01-01)
  - Total: 451
  - Density: 19/km^{2} (49/sq mi)
- Time zone: UTC+1 (CET)
  - Summer (DST): UTC+2 (CEST)
- Postal code: 37187
- Website: www.mirandadeazan.com

Miranda de Azán is a municipality located in the province of Salamanca, Castile and León, Spain. As of 2016 the municipality has a population of 419 inhabitants.
