= Cilleros de la Bastida =

- Municipality
- Location in Salamanca

- Location in Spain
- Coordinates: 40°34′N 6°04′W
- Country: Spain
- Autonomous community: Castile and León
- Province: Salamanca
- Comarca: Sierra de Francia

Area
  - Total: 17 km^{2} (6.6 sq mi)
- Elevation: 1,067 m (3,501 ft)

Population (2025-01-01)
  - Total: 21
  - Density: 1.2/km^{2} (3.2/sq mi)
- Time zone: UTC+1 (CET)
  - Summer (DST): UTC+2 (CEST)
- Postal code: 37692

Cilleros de la Bastida is a village and municipality in the province of Salamanca, western Spain, part of the autonomous community of Castile-Leon. It is located 64 kilometres (40 mi) from the provincial capital city of Salamanca and has a population of only 19 people.

== Geography ==
The municipality covers an area of 17 km^{2} (6.6 sq mi). It lies 1,067 metres (3,501 ft) above sea level and the postal code is 37692.
