= Pelabravo =

- Municipality
- Coat of arms

- Location in Salamanca

- Location in Spain
- Coordinates: 40°56′12″N 5°34′51″W
- Country: Spain
- Autonomous community: Castile and León
- Province: Salamanca
- Comarca: Campo de Salamanca

Government
  - Mayor: Patricia Diego (People's Party)

Area
  - Total: 23 km^{2} (8.9 sq mi)
- Elevation: 818 m (2,684 ft)

Population (2025-01-01)
  - Total: 1,427
  - Density: 62/km^{2} (160/sq mi)
- Time zone: UTC+1 (CET)
  - Summer (DST): UTC+2 (CEST)
- Postal code: 37181

Pelabravo is a municipality located in the province of Salamanca, Castile and León, Spain. As of 2016 the municipality has a population of 818 inhabitants.
