= Aldeaseca de Alba =

- Municipality
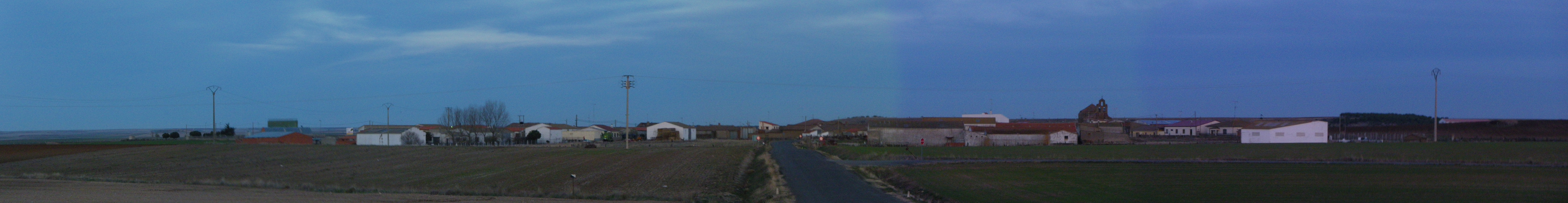

- Location in Salamanca

- Location in Spain
- Coordinates: 40°49′07″N 5°26′55″W
- Country: Spain
- Autonomous community: Castile and León
- Province: Salamanca
- Comarca: Tierra de Alba

Government
  - Mayor: Roberto Núñez Méndez (People's Party)

Area
  - Total: 17.58 km^{2} (6.79 sq mi)
- Elevation: 866 m (2,841 ft)

Population (2025-01-01)
  - Total: 65
  - Density: 3.7/km^{2} (9.6/sq mi)
- Time zone: UTC+1 (CET)
  - Summer (DST): UTC+2 (CEST)
- Postal code: 37870

Aldeaseca de Alba is a village and municipality in the province of Salamanca, western Spain, part of the autonomous community of Castile and León. It is located 27 kilometres (17 mi) from the city of Salamanca and has a population of 65 people. The municipality has an area of 17.58 km^{2} (6.79 sq mi).

The village lies 866 metres (2,841 ft) above sea level.
