= La Sagrada =

- Municipality
- Coat of arms

- Location within Salamanca

- Location in Spain
- Coordinates: 40°44′42″N 6°04′21″W
- Country: Spain
- Autonomous community: Castile and León
- Province: Salamanca
- Comarca: Campo de Salamanca

Government
  - Mayor: Florencia Martín (People's Party)

Area
  - Total: 40 km^{2} (15 sq mi)

Population (2025-01-01)
  - Total: 78
  - Density: 2.0/km^{2} (5.1/sq mi)
- Time zone: UTC+1 (CET)
  - Summer (DST): UTC+2 (CEST)
- Postal code: 37645

La Sagrada is a municipality located in the province of Salamanca, Castile and León, Spain. As of 2016 the municipality has a population of 112 inhabitants.
