= Peñarandilla =

- Municipality
- Flag Coat of arms

- Location in Salamanca

- Location in Spain
- Coordinates: 40°52′56″N 5°23′31″W
- Country: Spain
- Autonomous community: Castile and León
- Province: Salamanca
- Comarca: Tierra de Alba

Government
  - Mayor: Antonio Luis Sánchez Martín (People's Party)

Area
  - Total: 13 km^{2} (5.0 sq mi)
- Elevation: 827 m (2,713 ft)

Population (2025-01-01)
  - Total: 171
  - Density: 13/km^{2} (34/sq mi)
- Time zone: UTC+1 (CET)
  - Summer (DST): UTC+2 (CEST)
- Postal code: 37820

Peñarandilla is a municipality located in the province of Salamanca, Castile and León, Spain. As of 2016 the municipality has a population of 210.
