= Montemayor del Río =

- Municipality
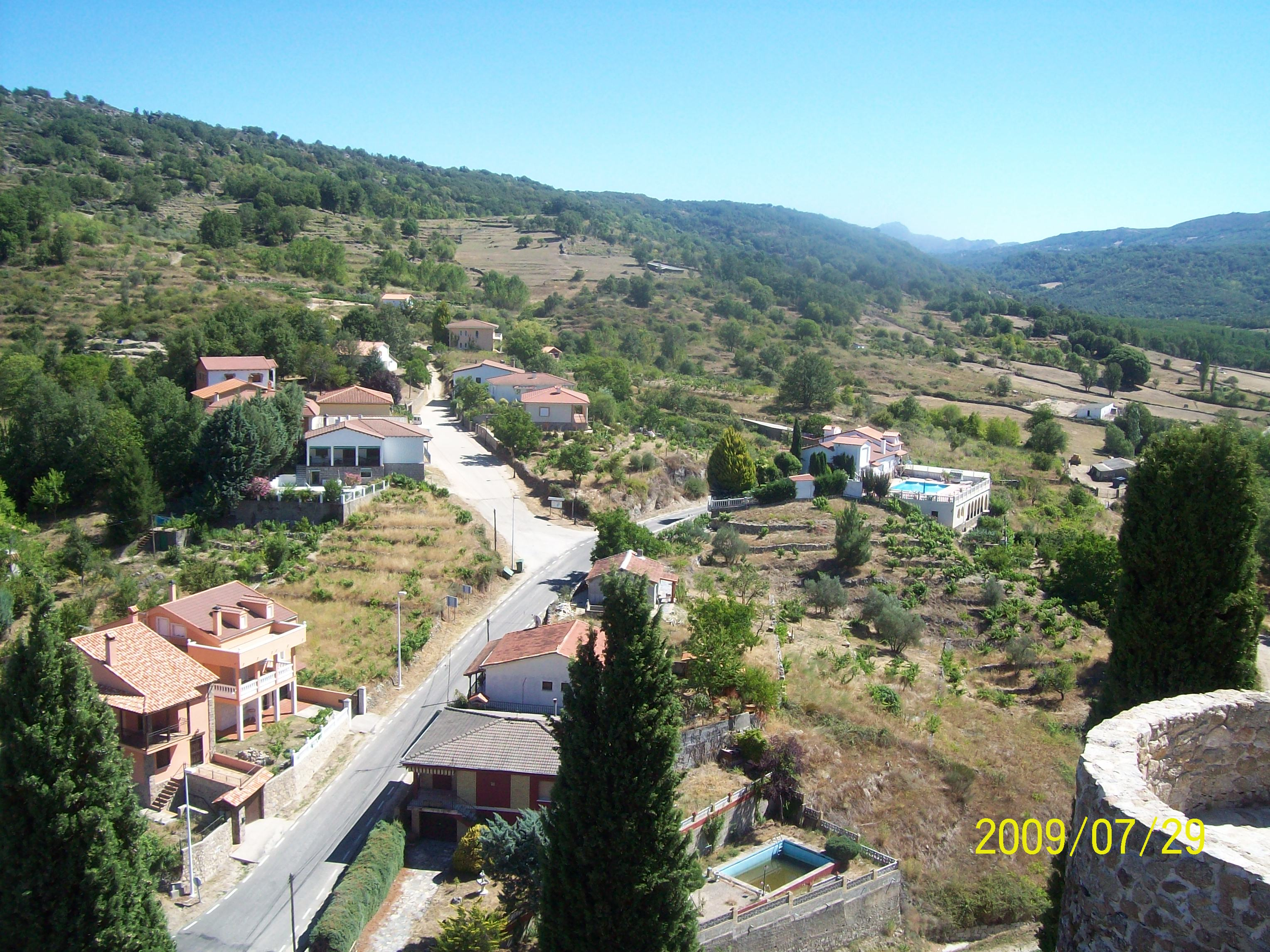

- Coat of arms

- Location in Salamanca

- Location in Spain
- Coordinates: 40°20′55″N 5°53′43″W
- Country: Spain
- Autonomous community: Castile and León
- Province: Salamanca
- Comarca: Sierra de Béjar

Government
  - Mayor: J. Antonio Jiménez (People's Party)

Area
  - Total: 15 km^{2} (5.8 sq mi)
- Elevation: 677 m (2,221 ft)

Population (2025-01-01)
  - Total: 245
  - Density: 16/km^{2} (42/sq mi)
- Time zone: UTC+1 (CET)
  - Summer (DST): UTC+2 (CEST)
- Postal code: 37727

Montemayor del Río is a municipality located in the province of Salamanca, Castile and León, Spain. As of 2016 the municipality has a population of 296 inhabitants.
