= Canillas de Abajo =

- Municipality
- Location in Salamanca

- Location in Spain
- Coordinates: 40°55′44″N 5°55′44″W
- Country: Spain
- Autonomous community: Castile and León
- Province: Salamanca
- Comarca: Campo de Salamanca

Government
  - Mayor: Alfonsa Sánchez (People's Party)

Area
  - Total: 39 km^{2} (15 sq mi)
- Elevation: 814 m (2,671 ft)

Population (2025-01-01)
  - Total: 64
  - Density: 1.6/km^{2} (4.3/sq mi)
- Time zone: UTC+1 (CET)
  - Summer (DST): UTC+2 (CEST)
- Postal code: 37448

Canillas de Abajo is a village and municipality in the province of Salamanca, western Spain, part of the autonomous community of Castile-Leon. It is 25 kilometres (16 mi) from the provincial capital city of Salamanca and has a population of 77 people. The municipality covers an area of 39 km^{2} (15 sq mi).

It lies 814 metres (2,671 ft) above sea level and the postal code is 37448.
