= Aldeaseca de la Frontera =

- Municipality
- Flag Coat of arms

- Location in Salamanca

- Location in Spain
- Coordinates: 40°56′30″N 5°12′28″W
- Country: Spain
- Autonomous community: Castile and León
- Province: Salamanca
- Comarca: Tierra de Peñaranda

Government
  - Mayor: Luis María Romero Ronco (People's Party)

Area
  - Total: 24.3 km^{2} (9.4 sq mi)
- Elevation: 900 m (3,000 ft)

Population (2025-01-01)
  - Total: 241
  - Density: 9.92/km^{2} (25.7/sq mi)
- Time zone: UTC+1 (CET)
  - Summer (DST): UTC+2 (CEST)
- Postal code: 37317

Aldeaseca de la Frontera is a village and municipality in the province of Salamanca, western Spain, part of the autonomous community of Castile and León. It is located 45 kilometres (28 mi) from the city of Salamanca and has a population of 292 people.

The village lies 900 metres (3,000 ft) above sea level.
