= Robliza de Cojos =

- Municipality
- Coat of arms

- Location in Salamanca

- Location in Spain
- Coordinates: 40°52′03″N 5°58′37″W
- Country: Spain
- Autonomous community: Castile and León
- Province: Salamanca
- Comarca: Campo de Salamanca

Government
  - Mayor: Alejandro Benito (People's Party)

Area
  - Total: 22 km^{2} (8.5 sq mi)
- Elevation: 819 m (2,687 ft)

Population (2025-01-01)
  - Total: 185
  - Density: 8.4/km^{2} (22/sq mi)
- Time zone: UTC+1 (CET)
  - Summer (DST): UTC+2 (CEST)
- Postal code: 37491

Robliza de Cojos is a municipality located in the province of Salamanca, Castile and León, Spain. As of 2016 the municipality has a population of 209 inhabitants.
