= Navacarros =

- Municipality
- Location in Salamanca

- Location in Spain
- Coordinates: 40°23′39″N 5°42′52″W
- Country: Spain
- Autonomous community: Castile and León
- Province: Salamanca
- Comarca: Sierra de Béjar

Government
  - Mayor: Francisco Bayo (PSOE)

Area
  - Total: 9 km^{2} (3.5 sq mi)
- Elevation: 1,120 m (3,670 ft)

Population (2025-01-01)
  - Total: 141
  - Density: 16/km^{2} (41/sq mi)
- Time zone: UTC+1 (CET)
  - Summer (DST): UTC+2 (CEST)
- Postal code: 37716

Navacarros is a municipality located in the province of Salamanca, Castile and León, Spain. As of 2016 the municipality has a population of 106 inhabitants.
