= Matilla de los Caños del Río =

- Municipality
- Coat of arms

- Location in Salamanca

- Location in Spain
- Coordinates: 40°49′34″N 5°56′35″W
- Country: Spain
- Autonomous community: Castile and León
- Province: Salamanca
- Comarca: Campo de Salamanca

Government
  - Mayor: Ciriaco Tardáguil (People's Party)

Area
  - Total: 69 km^{2} (27 sq mi)
- Elevation: 818 m (2,684 ft)

Population (2025-01-01)
  - Total: 607
  - Density: 8.8/km^{2} (23/sq mi)
- Time zone: UTC+1 (CET)
  - Summer (DST): UTC+2 (CEST)
- Postal code: 37450

Matilla de los Caños del Río is a village and municipality in the province of Salamanca, western Spain, part of the autonomous community of Castile-Leon. It is located 34 kilometres (21 mi) from the provincial capital city of Salamanca and has a population of only 654 people.

== Geography ==
The municipality covers an area of 69 km^{2} (27 sq mi). It lies 818 metres (2,684 ft) above sea level and the postal code is 37450.

== See also ==
- List of municipalities in Salamanca
