= Rollán =

- Municipality
- Location in Salamanca

- Location in Spain
- Coordinates: 40°57′42″N 5°56′17″W
- Country: Spain
- Autonomous community: Castile and León
- Province: Salamanca
- Comarca: Tierra de Ledesma

Government
  - Mayor: Leonardo Bernal García (PSOE)

Area
  - Total: 23 km^{2} (8.9 sq mi)
- Elevation: 804 m (2,638 ft)

Population (2025-01-01)
  - Total: 317
  - Density: 14/km^{2} (36/sq mi)
- Time zone: UTC+1 (CET)
  - Summer (DST): UTC+2 (CEST)
- Postal code: 37447

Rollán is a municipality located in the province of Salamanca, Castile and León, Spain. As of 2016 the municipality has a population of 388 inhabitants.
