= Barbadillo =

- municipality
- Coat of arms

- Location in Salamanca

- Location in Spain
- Coordinates: 40°55′55″N 5°52′53″W
- Country: Spain
- Autonomous community: Castile and León
- Province: Salamanca
- Comarca: Campo de Salamanca

Government
  - Mayor: Olegario García Pérez (People's Party)

Area
  - Total: 36 km^{2} (14 sq mi)
- Elevation: 808 m (2,651 ft)

Population (2025-01-01)
  - Total: 391
  - Density: 11/km^{2} (28/sq mi)
- Time zone: UTC+1 (CET)
  - Summer (DST): UTC+2 (CEST)
- Postal code: 37440

Barbadillo is a village and municipality in the province of Salamanca, western Spain, part of the autonomous community of Castile-Leon. It is located 22 kilometres (14 mi) from the city of Salamanca and has a population of 407 people. The municipality covers an area of 36 km^{2} (14 sq mi). The village lies 808 metres (2,651 ft) above sea level. Its postal code is 37440.
