= Pedrosillo de Alba =

- Municipality
- Coat of arms

- Location in Salamanca
- Coordinates: 40°49′15″N 5°22′31″W
- Country: Spain
- Autonomous community: Castile and León
- Province: Salamanca
- Comarca: Tierra de Alba

Government
  - Mayor: Joaquín Lorenzo Alonso Sánchez (PSOE)

Area
  - Total: 19 km^{2} (7.3 sq mi)
- Elevation: 838 m (2,749 ft)

Population (2025)
  - Total: 123
  - Density: 6.5/km^{2} (17/sq mi)
- Time zone: UTC+1 (CET)
  - Summer (DST): UTC+2 (CEST)
- Postal code: 37871

Pedrosillo de Alba is a municipality located in the province of Salamanca, Castile and León, Spain. As of 2016 the municipality has a population of inhabitants.
