= Calzada de Don Diego =

- Municipality
- Coat of arms

- Location in Salamanca

- Location in Spain
- Coordinates: 40°54′22″N 5°54′08″W
- Country: Spain
- Autonomous community: Castile and León
- Province: Salamanca
- Comarca: Campo de Salamanca

Government
  - Mayor: María Isabel Sánchez Bernal (People's Party)

Area
  - Total: 44 km^{2} (17 sq mi)
- Elevation: 815 m (2,674 ft)

Population (2025-01-01)
  - Total: 127
  - Density: 2.9/km^{2} (7.5/sq mi)
- Time zone: UTC+1 (CET)
  - Summer (DST): UTC+2 (CEST)
- Postal code: 37448

Calzada de Don Diego is a village and municipality in the province of Salamanca, western Spain, part of the autonomous community of Castile and León. It is 24 kilometres (15 mi) from the provincial capital city of Salamanca and as of 2014 had a population of 174 people . The municipality covers an area of 44 square kilometres (17 sq mi) and lies 815 metres (2,674 ft) above sea level. The postal code is 37448.
