= Calvarrasa de Arriba =

- Municipality
- Coat of arms

- Location in Salamanca

- Location in Spain
- Coordinates: 40°55′36″N 5°33′20″W
- Country: Spain
- Autonomous community: Castile and León
- Province: Salamanca
- Comarca: Campo de Salamanca

Government
  - Mayor: Julián Mateos (PSOE)

Area
  - Total: 26 km^{2} (10 sq mi)
- Elevation: 852 m (2,795 ft)

Population (2025-01-01)
  - Total: 604
  - Density: 23/km^{2} (60/sq mi)
- Time zone: UTC+1 (CET)
  - Summer (DST): UTC+2 (CEST)
- Postal code: 37191

Calvarrasa de Arriba is a village and municipality in the province of Salamanca, western Spain, part of the autonomous community of Castile-Leon. It is 10 kilometres (6.2 mi) from the provincial capital city of Salamanca and has a population of 604 people. The municipality covers an area of 26 km^{2} (10 sq mi).

It lies 852 metres (2,795 ft) above sea level and the postal code is 37191.
