= Navales =

- Municipality
- Flag Coat of arms

- Location in Salamanca
- Coordinates: 40°47′20″N 5°28′48″W
- Country: Spain
- Autonomous community: Castile and León
- Province: Salamanca
- Comarca: Tierra de Alba

Government
  - Mayor: Ignacio Martín Pérez (People's Party)

Area
  - Total: 17 km^{2} (6.6 sq mi)
- Elevation: 846 m (2,776 ft)

Population (2025-01-01)
  - Total: 312
  - Density: 18/km^{2} (48/sq mi)
- Time zone: UTC+1 (CET)
  - Summer (DST): UTC+2 (CEST)
- Postal code: 37880

Navales is a municipality located in the province of Salamanca, Castile and León, Spain. As of 2016 the municipality has a population of 335,985 inhabitants.
