= Aldeanueva de Figueroa =

- municipality
- Flag Coat of arms

- Location in Salamanca

- Location in Spain
- Coordinates: 41°09′52″N 5°31′29″W
- Country: Spain
- Autonomous community: Castile and León
- Province: Salamanca
- Comarca: La Armuña

Government
  - Mayor: María Candelas González Martín (People's Party)

Area
  - Total: 56 km^{2} (22 sq mi)
- Elevation: 871 m (2,858 ft)

Population (2025-01-01)
  - Total: 238
  - Density: 4.3/km^{2} (11/sq mi)
- Time zone: UTC+1 (CET)
  - Summer (DST): UTC+2 (CEST)
- Postal code: 37429

Aldeanueva de Figueroa is a village and municipality in the province of Salamanca, western Spain, part of the autonomous community of Castile-Leon. It is located 23 km (14 mi) from the city of Salamanca and has a population of 284 people. The municipality is roughly 56 km^{2} (22 sq mi).
