= Sorihuela =

- Municipality
- Coat of arms

- Location in Salamanca

- Location in Spain
- Coordinates: 40°26′40″N 5°40′40″W
- Country: Spain
- Autonomous community: Castile and León
- Province: Salamanca
- Comarca: Sierra de Béjar

Government
  - Mayor: María de Las Nieves García Mateos (People's Party)

Area
  - Total: 20 km^{2} (7.7 sq mi)
- Elevation: 1,007 m (3,304 ft)

Population (2025-01-01)
  - Total: 255
  - Density: 13/km^{2} (33/sq mi)
- Time zone: UTC+1 (CET)
  - Summer (DST): UTC+2 (CEST)
- Postal code: 37777

Sorihuela is a municipality located in the province of Salamanca, Castile and León, Spain. As of 2016 the municipality has a population of 263 inhabitants.
