= Sardón de los Frailes =

- Municipality
- Coat of arms

- Coordinates: 41°12′43″N 6°16′15″W
- Country: Spain
- Autonomous community: Castile and León
- Province: Salamanca
- Comarca: Tierra de Ledesma

Government
  - Mayor: Belisario del Arco Martín (PSOE area_magnitude =)

Area
  - Total: 32 km^{2} (12 sq mi)
- Elevation: 748 m (2,454 ft)

Population (2025-01-01)
  - Total: 98
  - Density: 3.1/km^{2} (7.9/sq mi)
- Time zone: UTC+1 (CET)
  - Summer (DST): UTC+2 (CEST)
- Website: www.sardondelosfrailes.es

Sardón de los Frailes is a municipality located in the province of Salamanca, Castile and León, Spain. As of 2016 the municipality has a population of 82 inhabitants.
