= Chagarcía Medianero =

- Municipality
- Location in Salamanca

- Location in Spain
- Coordinates: 40°38′55″N 5°22′56″W
- Country: Spain
- Autonomous community: Castile and León
- Province: Salamanca
- Comarca: Tierra de Alba

Government
  - Mayor: Juan Ignacio Sánchez González (People's Party)

Area
  - Total: 15 km^{2} (5.8 sq mi)
- Elevation: 1,041 m (3,415 ft)

Population (2025-01-01)
  - Total: 68
  - Density: 4.5/km^{2} (12/sq mi)
- Time zone: UTC+1 (CET)
  - Summer (DST): UTC+2 (CEST)
- Postal code: 37861
- Vehicle registration: SA

Chagarcía Medianero is a village and municipality in the province of Salamanca, western Spain, part of the autonomous community of Castile-Leon. It is located 50 kilometres (31 mi) from the provincial capital city of Salamanca and has a population of 84 people. The municipality covers an area of 15 km^{2} (5.8 sq mi).

It lies 1,041 metres (3,415 ft) above sea level.

The post code is 37861.

Historical population

Year	Pop.	±%
1991	181	—
1996	164	−9.4%

Year	Pop.	±%
2001	136	−17.1%
2004	120	−11.8%
