= Vecinos, Salamanca =

Vecinos
- Municipality
- Coat of arms

- Location in Salamanca

- Location in Spain
- Coordinates: 40°46′46″N 5°52′37″W
- Country: Spain
- Autonomous community: Castile and León
- Province: Salamanca
- Comarca: Campo de Salamanca

Government
  - Mayor: José Antonio Jiménez Sánchez (People's Party)

Area
  - Total: 45.06 km^{2} (17.40 sq mi)
- Elevation: 900 m (3,000 ft)

Population (2025-01-01)
  - Total: 231
  - Density: 5.13/km^{2} (13.3/sq mi)
- Time zone: UTC+1 (CET)
  - Summer (DST): UTC+2 (CEST)
- Postal code: 37452

Vecinos is a municipality located in the province of Salamanca, Castile and León, Spain. As of 2016 the municipality had a population of 264.
