= Villagonzalo de Tormes =

- Municipality
- Coat of arms

- Location in Salamanca

- Location in Spain
- Coordinates: 40°53′33″N 5°29′53″W
- Country: Spain
- Autonomous community: Castile and León
- Province: Salamanca
- Comarca: Campo de Salamanca

Government
  - Mayor: Inés Martín Rodríguez (People's Party)

Area
  - Total: 26 km^{2} (10 sq mi)
- Elevation: 801 m (2,628 ft)

Population (2025-01-01)
  - Total: 212
  - Density: 8.2/km^{2} (21/sq mi)
- Time zone: UTC+1 (CET)
  - Summer (DST): UTC+2 (CEST)
- Postal code: 37893

Villagonzalo de Tormes is a municipality located in the province of Salamanca, Castile and León, Spain. As of 2016, the municipality has recorded a population of 222 inhabitants.
