= Berrocal de Huebra =

- Municipality
- Flag Coat of arms

- Location in Salamanca

- Location in Spain
- Coordinates: 40°43′01″N 5°59′58″W
- Country: Spain
- Autonomous community: Castile and León
- Province: Salamanca
- Comarca: Campo de Salamanca

Government
  - Mayor: Luis Marcos Lorenzo (People's Party)

Area
  - Total: 39 km^{2} (15 sq mi)
- Elevation: 899 m (2,949 ft)

Population (2025-01-01)
  - Total: 75
  - Density: 1.9/km^{2} (5.0/sq mi)
- Time zone: UTC+1 (CET)
  - Summer (DST): UTC+2 (CEST)
- Postal code: 37609

Berrocal de Huebra is a village and municipality in the province of Salamanca, western Spain, part of the autonomous community of Castile-Leon. It is 43 kilometres (27 mi) from the provincial capital city of Salamanca and has a population of 68 people. It lies 899 metres (2,949 ft) above sea level and the postal code is 37609.
