= Calvarrasa de Abajo =

- Municipality
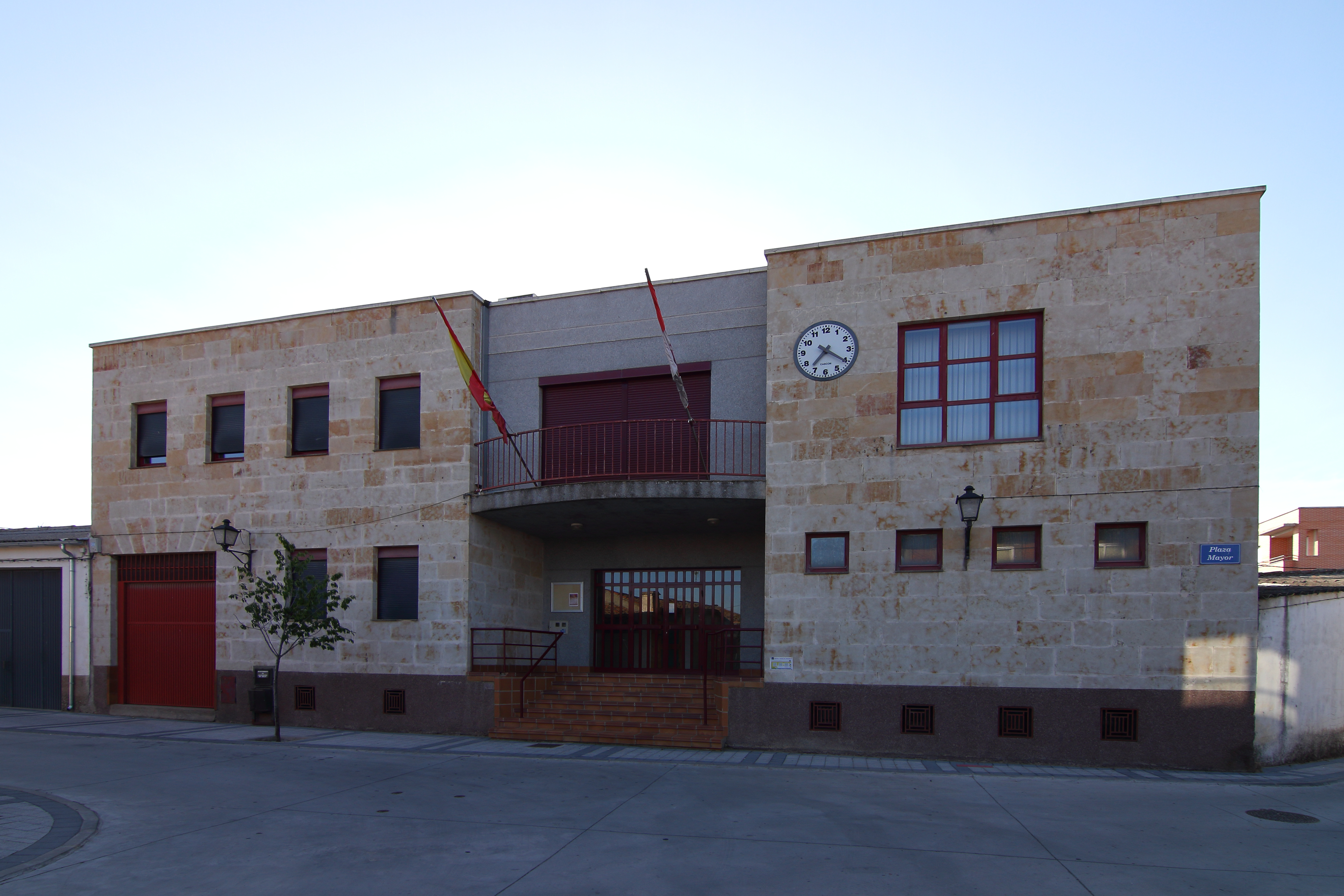

- Flag Coat of arms

- Location of Calvarrasa de Abajo in the province of Salamanca

- Location within Spain
- Coordinates: 40°57′N 5°33′W
- Country: Spain
- Autonomous community: Castile and León
- Province: Salamanca
- Comarca: Campo de Salamanca

Government
  - Mayor: Marcelino Mateos Hernández (People's Party)

Area
  - Total: 28 km^{2} (11 sq mi)
- Elevation: 785 m (2,575 ft)

Population (2025-01-01)
  - Total: 1,240
  - Density: 44/km^{2} (110/sq mi)
- Time zone: UTC+1 (CET)
  - Summer (DST): UTC+2 (CEST)
- Postal Code: 37181
- Website: www.calvarrasadeabajo.es

Calvarrasa de Abajo is a village and municipality in the province of Salamanca, western Spain, part of the autonomous community of Castile-Leon. It is 10 kilometres (6.2 mi) from the provincial capital city of Salamanca and has a population of 1,143 people. The municipality covers an area of 28 km^{2} (11 sq mi).

It lies 785 metres (2,575 ft) above sea level and the postal code is 37181.
