= Machacón =

- Municipality
- Location in Salamanca

- Location in Spain
- Coordinates: 40°55′36″N 5°31′28″W
- Country: Spain
- Autonomous community: Castile and León
- Province: Salamanca
- Comarca: Campo de Salamanca

Government
  - Mayor: Eva María Picado Valverde (People's Party)

Area
  - Total: 19 km^{2} (7.3 sq mi)
- Elevation: 810 m (2,660 ft)

Population (2025-01-01)
  - Total: 442
  - Density: 23/km^{2} (60/sq mi)
- Time zone: UTC+1 (CET)
  - Summer (DST): UTC+2 (CEST)
- Postal code: 37180

Machacón is a municipality located in the province of Salamanca, Castile and León, Spain. As of 2016 the municipality has a population of 453 inhabitants.
