= Province of Salamanca =

Province of Spain

Province of Salamanca Provincia de Salamanca
- Province
- Flag Coat of arms

- Location of the Province of Salamanca in Spain
- Coordinates: 40°49′N 6°00′W
- Country: Spain
- Autonomous community: Castile and León
- Capital: Salamanca
- Municipalities: 362 (list)

Government
  - Type: Diputación
  - Body: Provincial Deputation of Salamanca
  - President: Javier Iglesias (PP)

Area
  - Total: 12,348.35 km^{2} (4,767.72 sq mi)
  - Rank: 16th in Spain
- 2.4% of Spain

Population (2025)
  - Total: 328,446
  - Rank: 38th in Spain
  - Density: 26.5984/km^{2} (68.8895/sq mi)
- 0.7% of Spain
- Demonym(s): Salmantino/a, charro/a
- Website: Official website

The Province of Salamanca (Spanish: Provincia de Salamanca [salaˈmaŋka]) is a province of western Spain, in the western part of the autonomous community of Castile and León. It is bordered by the provinces of Ávila, Cáceres, Valladolid, and Zamora, and on the west by Portugal.

It has a population of 328,446 in an area of 12,348.35 square kilometres (4,767.72 sq mi).

It is divided into 362 municipalities, 11 comarcas, 32 mancomunidades, and five judicial districts. Of the 362 municipalities, more than half are villages with fewer than 300 people.

== History ==
The Vettones occupied the areas of the current Spanish provinces of Salamanca and Ávila, as well as parts of Cáceres, Toledo and Zamora. They were a pre-Roman people of Celtic culture. Their numerous archaeological sites exist throughout the province, and several locality names have Vettone origin, some of which are quite important. This is the case of Salamanca (Salmantica), Ledesma (Bletisama) and Ciudad Rodrigo (Augustobriga). Vettone villages were often established on the banks of rivers or on mountains. Examples include Salamanca and Ledesma, built along the Tormes, Bermellar, El Castillo (Saldeana) Moncalvo (Hinojosa de Duero), Picon de la Mora (Picones) and Castro de Yecla la Vieja (Yecla de Yeltes) next to Huebra, Ciudad Rodrigo, Irueña (Fuenteguinaldo) and Lerilla (Zamarra) on the banks of the Agueda and Castro de Las Merchanas (Lumbrales), in a loop of the Camaces. The area between La Armuña and Salamanca marked the border between Vettones and Vaccaei, the other pre-Roman people of the province. They were situated in the northeast area of the province.

== Geography ==
Salamanca Province is situated in western Spain, in the western part of Castile and León. It has an average altitude of 823 meters, but there are large variations throughout the province, with 2,428 metres (7,966 ft) being the highest point at the peak of the Ceja Canchal in the Sierra de Béjar range, and 116 metres (381 ft) being the lowest point in the valley of the Salto de Saucelle. Also of note is the Sierra de Francia mountain range. The Salamanca hydrographic network is mainly formed by the Duero basin. The most important rivers are the Duero, Tormes, Águeda, Huebra, and Yeltes rivers.

The region is well-irrigated with a number of dams and reservoirs, and with more than 3,400 million cubic meters, it is the province with the third highest water storage capacity in Spain, second only to the Province of Badajoz and the Province of Cáceres. Of particular note is the Almendra Dam, five kilometres from the village of Almendra. Constructed between 1964 and 1970, the dam forms part of the hydroelectric system known as the Duero Drops, along with the Castro, Ricobayo, Saucelle and Villalcampo. It is one of the largest reservoirs in Spain with an area of 86.5 square kilometres (33.4 sq mi) and 2.5 billion cubic metres of water. The dam itself is more than half a kilometre wide and, at a height of 202 metres (663 ft), it is one of Spain's tallest structures.

== Municipalities ==
The province has 362 municipalities:

- Abusejo
- Agallas
- Ahigal de los Aceiteros
- Ahigal de Villarino
- La Alameda de Gardón
- La Alamedilla
- Alaraz
- Alba de Tormes
- Alba de Yeltes
- La Alberca
- La Alberguería de Argañán
- Alconada
- Aldea del Obispo
- Aldeacipreste
- Aldeadávila de la Ribera
- Aldealengua
- Aldeanueva de Figueroa
- Aldeanueva de la Sierra
- Aldearrodrigo
- Aldearrubia
- Aldeaseca de Alba
- Aldeaseca de la Frontera
- Aldeatejada
- Aldeavieja de Tormes
- Aldehuela de la Bóveda
- Aldehuela de Yeltes
- Almenara de Tormes
- Almendra
- Anaya de Alba
- Añover de Tormes
- Arabayona de Mógica
- Arapiles
- Arcediano
- El Arco
- Armenteros
- La Atalaya
- Babilafuente
- Bañobárez
- Barbadillo
- Barbalos
- Barceo
- Barruecopardo
- La Bastida
- Béjar
- Beleña
- Bermellar
- Berrocal de Huebra
- Berrocal de Salvatierra
- Boada
- El Bodón
- Bogajo
- La Bouza
- Bóveda del Río Almar
- Brincones
- Buenamadre
- Buenavista
- El Cabaco
- La Cabeza de Béjar
- Cabeza del Caballo
- Cabezabellosa de la Calzada
- Cabrerizos
- Cabrillas
- Calvarrasa de Abajo
- Calvarrasa de Arriba
- La Calzada de Béjar
- Calzada de Don Diego
- Calzada de Valdunciel
- Campillo de Azaba
- El Campo de Peñaranda
- Candelario
- Canillas de Abajo
- Cantagallo
- Cantalapiedra
- Cantalpino
- Cantaracillo
- Carbajosa de la Sagrada
- Carpio de Azaba
- Carrascal de Barregas
- Carrascal del Obispo
- Casafranca
- Las Casas del Conde
- Casillas de Flores
- Castellanos de Moriscos
- Castellanos de Villiquera
- Castillejo de Martín Viejo
- Castraz
- Cepeda
- Cereceda de la Sierra
- Cerezal de Peñahorcada
- Cerralbo
- El Cerro
- Cespedosa de Tormes
- Cilleros de la Bastida
- Cipérez
- Ciudad Rodrigo
- Coca de Alba
- Colmenar de Montemayor
- Cordovilla
- Cristóbal
- El Cubo de Don Sancho
- Chagarcía Medianero
- Dios le Guarde
- Doñinos de Ledesma
- Doñinos de Salamanca
- Ejeme
- La Encina
- Encina de San Silvestre
- Encinas de Abajo
- Encinas de Arriba
- Encinasola de los Comendadores
- Endrinal
- Escurial de la Sierra
- Espadaña
- Espeja
- Espino de la Orbada
- Florida de Liébana
- Forfoleda
- Frades de la Sierra
- La Fregeneda
- Fresnedoso
- Fresno Alhándiga
- La Fuente de San Esteban
- Fuenteguinaldo
- Fuenteliante
- Fuenterroble de Salvatierra
- Fuentes de Béjar
- Fuentes de Oñoro
- Gajates
- Galindo y Perahuy
- Galinduste
- Galisancho
- Gallegos de Argañán
- Gallegos de Solmirón
- Garcibuey
- Garcihernández
- Garcirrey
- Gejuelo del Barro
- Golpejas
- Gomecello
- Guadramiro
- Guijo de Ávila
- Guijuelo
- Herguijuela de Ciudad Rodrigo
- Herguijuela de la Sierra
- Herguijuela del Campo
- Hinojosa de Duero
- Horcajo de Montemayor
- Horcajo Medianero
- La Hoya
- Huerta
- Iruelos
- Ituero de Azaba
- Juzbado
- Lagunilla
- Larrodrigo
- Ledesma
- Ledrada
- Linares de Riofrío
- Lumbrales
- Machacón
- Macotera
- Madroñal
- El Maíllo
- Malpartida
- Mancera de Abajo
- El Manzano
- Martiago
- Martín de Yeltes
- Martinamor
- Masueco
- La Mata de Ledesma
- Matilla de los Caños del Río
- La Maya
- Membribe de la Sierra
- Mieza
- El Milano
- Miranda de Azán
- Miranda del Castañar
- Mogarraz
- Molinillo
- Monforte de la Sierra
- Monleón
- Monleras
- Monsagro
- Montejo
- Montemayor del Río
- Monterrubio de Armuña
- Monterrubio de la Sierra
- Morasverdes
- Morille
- Moríñigo
- Moriscos
- Moronta
- Mozárbez
- Narros de Matalayegua
- Nava de Béjar
- Nava de Francia
- Nava de Sotrobal
- Navacarros
- Navales
- Navalmoral de Béjar
- Navamorales
- Navarredonda de la Rinconada
- Navasfrías
- Negrilla de Palencia
- Olmedo de Camaces
- La Orbada
- Pajares de la Laguna
- Palacios del Arzobispo
- Palaciosrubios
- Palencia de Negrilla
- Parada de Arriba
- Parada de Rubiales
- Paradinas de San Juan
- Pastores
- El Payo
- Pedraza de Alba
- Pedrosillo de Alba
- Pedrosillo de los Aires
- Pedrosillo el Ralo
- El Pedroso de la Armuña
- Pelabravo
- Pelarrodríguez
- Pelayos
- La Peña
- Peñacaballera
- Peñaparda
- Peñaranda de Bracamonte
- Peñarandilla
- Peralejos de Abajo
- Peralejos de Arriba
- Pereña de la Ribera
- Peromingo
- Pinedas
- El Pino de Tormes
- Pitiegua
- Pizarral
- Poveda de las Cintas
- Pozos de Hinojo
- Puebla de Azaba
- Puebla de San Medel
- Puebla de Yeltes
- Puente del Congosto
- Puertas
- Puerto de Béjar
- Puerto Seguro
- Rágama
- La Redonda
- Retortillo
- La Rinconada de la Sierra
- Robleda
- Robliza de Cojos
- Rollán
- Saelices el Chico
- La Sagrada
- El Sahugo
- Salamanca
- Saldeana
- Salmoral
- Salvatierra de Tormes
- San Cristóbal de la Cuesta
- San Esteban de la Sierra
- San Felices de los Gallegos
- San Martín del Castañar
- San Miguel de Valero
- San Miguel del Robledo
- San Morales
- San Muñoz
- San Pedro de Rozados
- San Pedro del Valle
- San Pelayo de Guareña
- Sanchón de la Ribera
- Sanchón de la Sagrada
- Sanchotello
- Sancti-Spíritus
- Sando
- Santa María de Sando
- Santa Marta de Tormes
- Santiago de la Puebla
- Santibáñez de Béjar
- Santibáñez de la Sierra
- Santiz
- Los Santos
- Sardón de los Frailes
- Saucelle
- Sepulcro-Hilario
- Sequeros
- Serradilla del Arroyo
- Serradilla del Llano
- La Sierpe
- Sieteiglesias de Tormes
- Sobradillo
- Sorihuela
- Sotoserrano
- Tabera de Abajo
- La Tala
- Tamames
- Tarazona de Guareña
- Tardáguila
- El Tejado
- Tejeda y Segoyuela
- Tenebrón
- Terradillos
- Topas
- Tordillos
- El Tornadizo
- Torresmenudas
- Trabanca
- Tremedal de Tormes
- Valdecarros
- Valdefuentes de Sangusín
- Valdehijaderos
- Valdelacasa
- Valdelageve
- Valdelosa
- Valdemierque
- Valderrodrigo
- Valdunciel
- Valero
- Vallejera de Riofrío
- Valverde de Valdelacasa
- Valsalabroso
- Valverdón
- Vecinos, Salamanca
- Vega de Tirados
- Las Veguillas
- La Vellés
- Ventosa del Río Almar
- La Vídola
- Villaflores
- Villagonzalo de Tormes
- Villalba de los Llanos
- Villamayor
- Villanueva del Conde
- Villar de Argañán
- Villar de Ciervo
- Villar de Gallimazo
- Villar de la Yegua
- Villar de Peralonso
- Villar de Samaniego
- Villares de la Reina
- Villares de Yeltes
- Villarino de los Aires
- Villarmayor
- Villarmuerto
- Villasbuenas
- Villasdardo
- Villaseco de los Gamitos
- Villaseco de los Reyes
- Villasrubias
- Villaverde de Guareña
- Villavieja de Yeltes
- Villoria
- Villoruela
- Vilvestre
- Vitigudino
- Yecla de Yeltes
- Zamarra
- Zamayón
- Zarapicos
- La Zarza de Pumareda
- Zorita de la Frontera

== Demographics ==
As of 2025, the population is 328,446, of which 48.4% are male, and 51.6% are female. Minors make up 13.1% of the population, and seniors make up 28.4%.

Historical population

Year	Pop.	±%
1842	179,656	—
1857	263,516	+46.7%
1877	288,884	+9.6%
1887	320,569	+11.0%
1900	326,233	+1.8%
1910	352,486	+8.0%
1920	342,264	−2.9%
1930	356,882	+4.3%
1940	398,706	+11.7%

Year	Pop.	±%
1950	415,127	+4.1%
1960	415,813	+0.2%
1970	380,133	−8.6%
1981	364,305	−4.2%
1991	357,801	−1.8%
2001	345,609	−3.4%
2011	350,018	+1.3%
2021	327,735	−6.4%

Source: INE

=== Immigration ===
As of 2025, immigrants make up 10.6% of the population. The 5 largest foreign countries of birth are Colombia, Peru, Venezuela, Morocco, and France.

== Landmarks ==
There are Roman Catholic cathedrals at Salamanca and Ciudad Rodrigo. The Old Cathedral of Salamanca was founded by Bishop Jerome of Périgord, in the 12th century and completed in Romanesque/Gothic style in the 14th century. It is dedicated to Santa Maria de la Sede (Saint Mary of the See). The New Cathedral of Salamanca was constructed between the 16th and 18th centuries in the Late Gothic and Baroque styles. Building began in 1513 and the cathedral was consecrated in 1733. It was commissioned by Ferdinand V of Castile of Spain. It was declared a national monument by royal decree in 1887.

== See also ==
- Kingdom of León
- List of municipalities in Salamanca
