= Natural Park of Las Batuecas =

Natural Park Batuecas - Sierra de Francia
- Interactive map of Natural Park Batuecas - Sierra de Francia
- Location: Castile and Leon, Salamanca, Spain
- Area: 323 km^{2} (125 sq mi)
- Established: 11 July 2000
- Governing body: Nature Reserve; Biosphere Reserve; SPA ES4150005; LIC ES4150107
- Website: www.patrimonionatural.org/ren.php?espacio_id=8

The Natural Park of Las Batuecas - Sierra de Francia is a protected natural area in the west of Spain and particularly in the south-west of the Salamanca region. In the autonomous community Castile and Leon, along the border with Extremadura.

The natural park (Spain) was established on July 11, 2000. It includes 15 different municipalities: Monsagro, El Maíllo, Serradilla del Arroyo, La Alberca, El Cabaco, Nava de Francia, Mogarraz, Herguijuela de la Sierra, Monforte de la Sierra, Madroñal, Cepeda, Villanueva del Conde, Miranda del Castañar and Sotoserrano San Martin del Castañar was added on 18 December 2008.

== Ecosystems ==
=== Wildlife ===
The park covers a vast area covering part of the Sierra de Francia and the Batuecas valley within it, a place that also gives its name to the park. This is where most of the wildlife and flora are present in the area, and where some of the most unusual Spanish biodiversity can be seen.

The black stork is the jewel of the park, and has a small colony which is an essential value for being a bridge between existing populations in the Arribes del Duero Natural Park and those living in Extremadura. Other birds present in the park includes common cuckoo, red-legged partridge, woodpigeon, European turtle dove, European robin, reed bunting, common blackbird, Iberian grey shrike, grey wagtail and white wagtail and the Eurasian blue tit.

=== Flora ===
The region of the Sierra de Francia is formed by an intricate depression covered by the Alagón River. Within it there are two hidden rough and rugged valleys, which provide places of safe haven and perfect hiding, but this also creates an oppressive narrowness.

== Historical-artistic ==
Traditional culture and architecture is highly conserved in the municipalities of the Sierra. Several villages are protected by the Spanish historic-artistic declaration including: Mogarraz, San Martin Castañar, Sequeros, Monleón, Miranda del Castañar and La Alberca.
