= Sierra de Francia (comarca) =

Coordinates: 40°15′N 6°00′W

- Comarca
- Location in Salamanca
- Country: Spain
- Autonomous community: Castile and León
- Province: Salamanca

Area
  - Total: 628.43 km^{2} (242.64 sq mi)

Population
  - Total: 9,023
  - Density: 14.36/km^{2} (37.19/sq mi)
- Time zone: UTC+1 (CET)
  - Summer (DST): UTC+2 (CEST)

The Sierra de Francia is a comarca located at the southern end of Salamanca Province, Castile and León, Spain. It is located about 70 km from Salamanca city. It borders with the Las Hurdes and Las Batuecas comarcas of Extremadura to the south; the Campo Charro to the north and the Sierra de Béjar to the east. The region is sparsely inhabited and its few towns have great cultural value.

== Geography ==
The mountain range Sierra de Francia belongs to the Sistema Central. Its slopes are covered with forests of alder, oak, pine and ash. They rise over the Northern Castilian Plateau and mark the geographical limit of its southwestern plains (Llanura Salmantina). From its southern side this mountain chain marks the northern limit of Las Hurdes, the legendary Extremaduran comarca. The mountain range consists of a quite regular succession of peaks of moderate height, of which the Pico de La Hastiala (1.735 m) is the highest. At the top of the Peña de Francia (1723 m) stands one of the highest Virgin Mary shrines of the world, as well as a RTVE antenna. Other summits worth mentioning are the Mesa del Francés (1.638 m) and the Pico Robledo (1.614 m). All these peaks are usually covered with snow in the winter season.

Among the rivers that cut valleys in the sierra, the most famous is the Río Francia, which gives the mountain chain its name, as well as the Alagón.

== Natural park and biosphere ==
Most of Sierra de Francia's territory, together with the valley of Las Batuecas was declared Las Batuecas-Sierra de Francia Natural Park in 1978. Together with the neighboring Sierra de Béjar (comarca) it constitutes a Biosphere Reserve. Some of the towns of the comarca have been officially declared Conjunto Histórico-Artístico owing to their cultural and architectural value.

== Municipalities ==
Sierra de Francia contains the following 26 municipalities:

- Aldeanueva de la Sierra
- Cepeda
- Cereceda de la Sierra
- Cilleros de la Bastida
- El Cabaco
- El Maíllo
- El Tornadizo
- Escurial de la Sierra
- Garcibuey
- Herguijuela de la Sierra
- La Alberca (capital of the comarca and declared Conjunto Histórico-Artístico)
- La Bastida
- La Rinconada de la Sierra
- Las Casas del Conde
- Linares de Riofrío
- Madroñal
- Miranda del Castañar (Conjunto Histórico-Artístico)
- Mogarraz (Conjunto Histórico-Artístico)
- Molinillo
- Monforte de la Sierra
- Nava de Francia
- Navarredonda de la Rinconada
- Pinedas
- San Esteban de la Sierra
- San Martín del Castañar (Conjunto Histórico-Artístico)
- San Miguel de Valero
- San Miguel del Robledo
- Santibáñez de la Sierra
- Sequeros (Conjunto Histórico-Artístico)
- Sotoserrano
- Valero
- Villanueva del Conde (Conjunto Histórico-Artístico)
