= Cereceda de la Sierra =

- Municipality
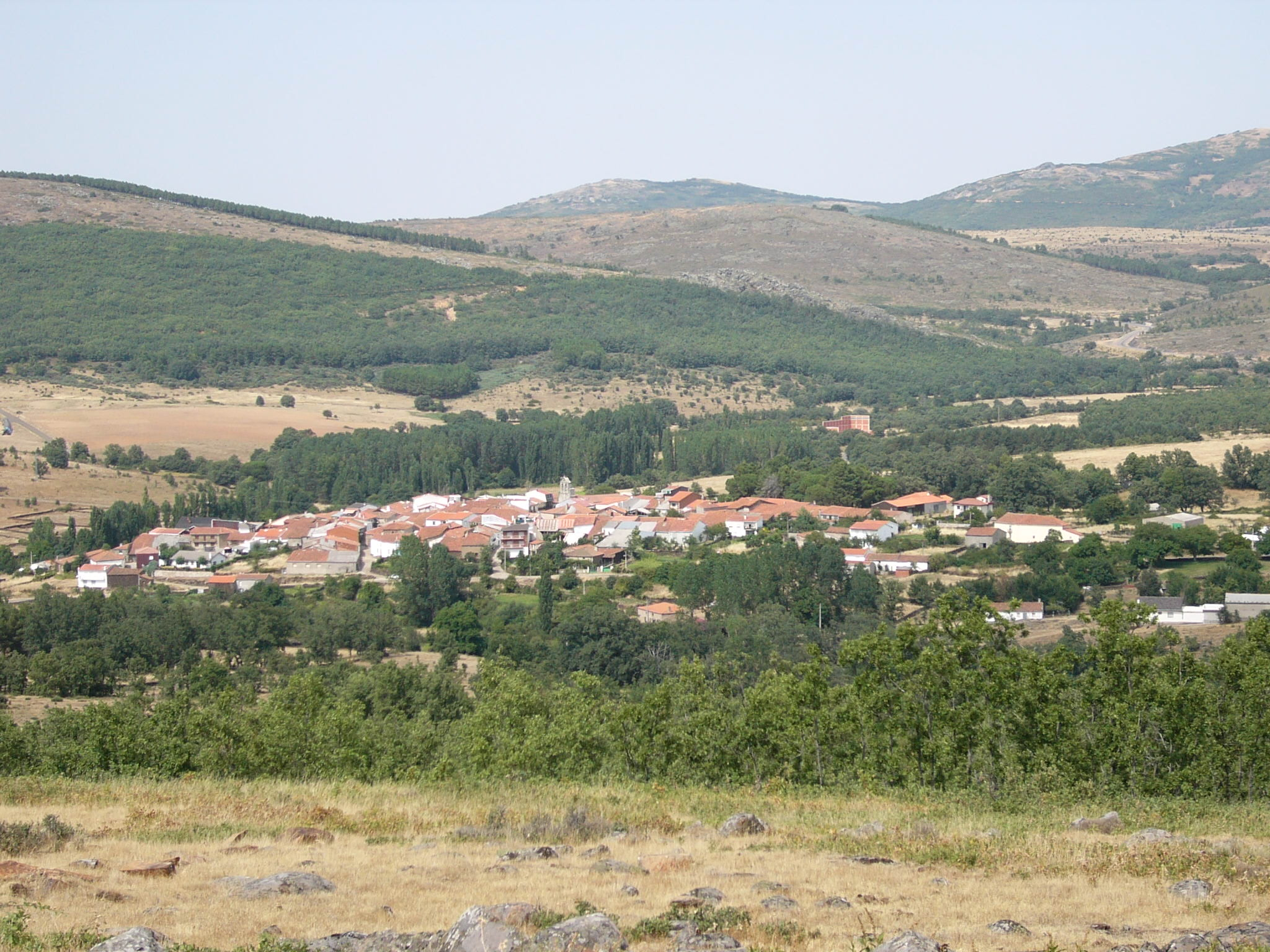

- Flag Coat of arms

- Location in Salamanca

- Location in Spain
- Coordinates: 40°34′N 6°05′W
- Country: Spain
- Autonomous community: Castile and León
- Province: Salamanca
- Comarca: Sierra de Francia

Area
  - Total: 15 km^{2} (5.8 sq mi)

Population (2025-01-01)
  - Total: 55
  - Density: 3.7/km^{2} (9.5/sq mi)
- Demonym: Cerecedanos/gatos(cats)
- Time zone: UTC+1 (CET)
  - Summer (DST): UTC+2 (CEST)
- Postal code: 37621
- River: Yeltes

Cereceda de la Sierra is a municipality in the province of Salamanca, western Spain, part of the autonomous community of Castile-Leon. It is located 68 kilometres (42 mi) from the city of Salamanca and as of 2016 had a population of 75 people.

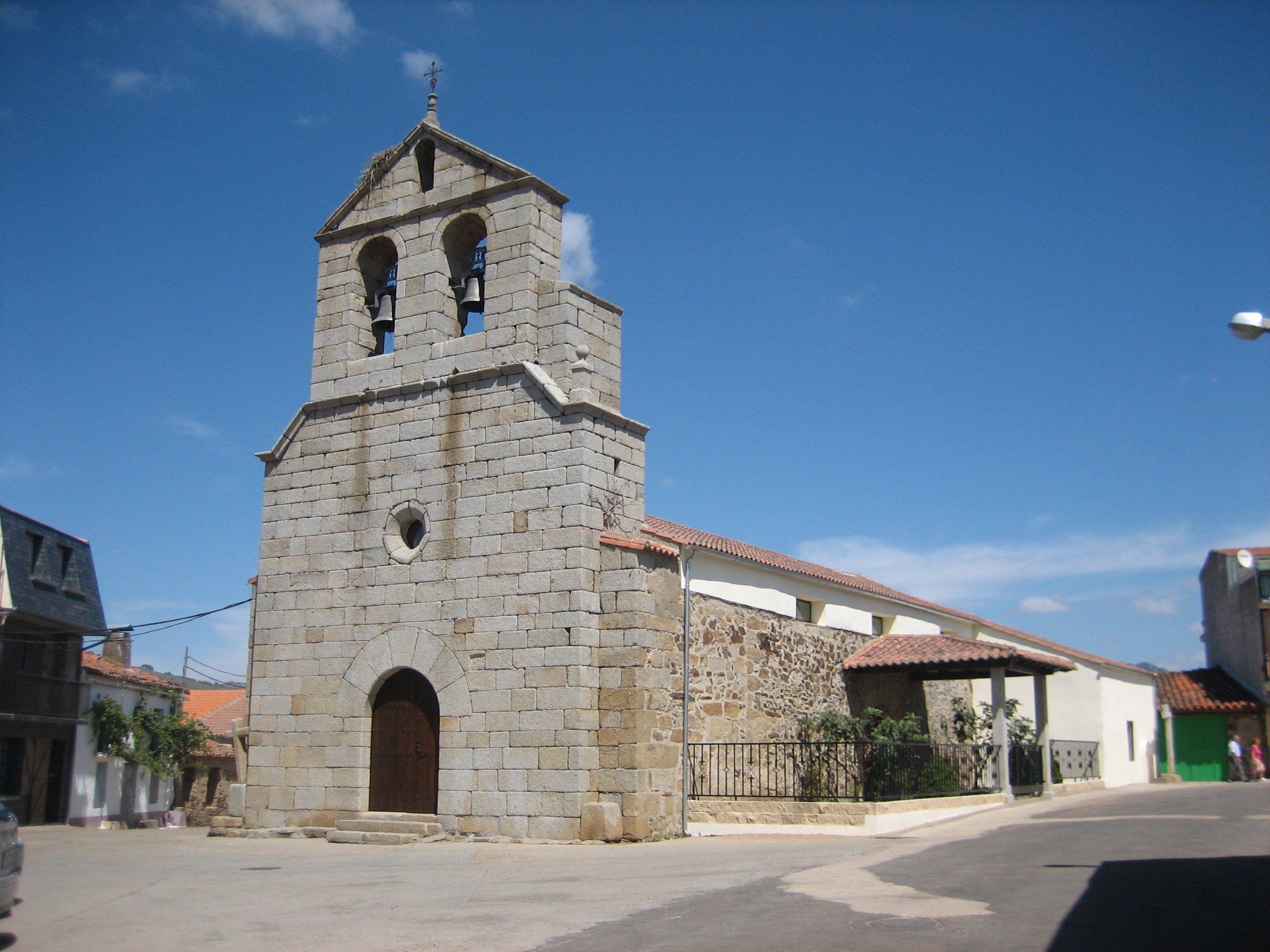
The church Ntra Sra del Rosario

The vast majority of the population emigrated to other parts of Spain in the sixties and seventies but used to come back to his native land on summer holidays, most of them have a house in the village.

There is only one bar that agglutinates the shop and pub functions.

The romanic church, Ntra Sra del Rosario, and the Roman bridge called Puente Cantería, are the most important examples of the local architecture as well as the typical houses most of them rebuilt by the emigrants in the last twenty years. There is a school building with a wall court behind to play typical Spanish sport as pelota with a racket or one hand and also to play traditional sport known as calva. But the most popular game in this village is the tute, a popular card game which is played at the pubs all along the year and the losers occasionally have to paid the drinks that the winners consume as they are playing.

The local amateur football club is formed with the sons and grandsons of the local inhabitants that are proud of their parents and grandparents' land. It used to play a married-single match every year as part of the local summer celebrations.

The Sierra de Francia is the comarca that includes not only Cereceda but many small towns as El Cabaco, La Nava de Francia, Tamames and La Alberca that are typical places to visit on summer and very similar because all of them receive the emigrants that come back home to spend the summer holidays.
