= San Esteban de la Sierra =

- Municipality
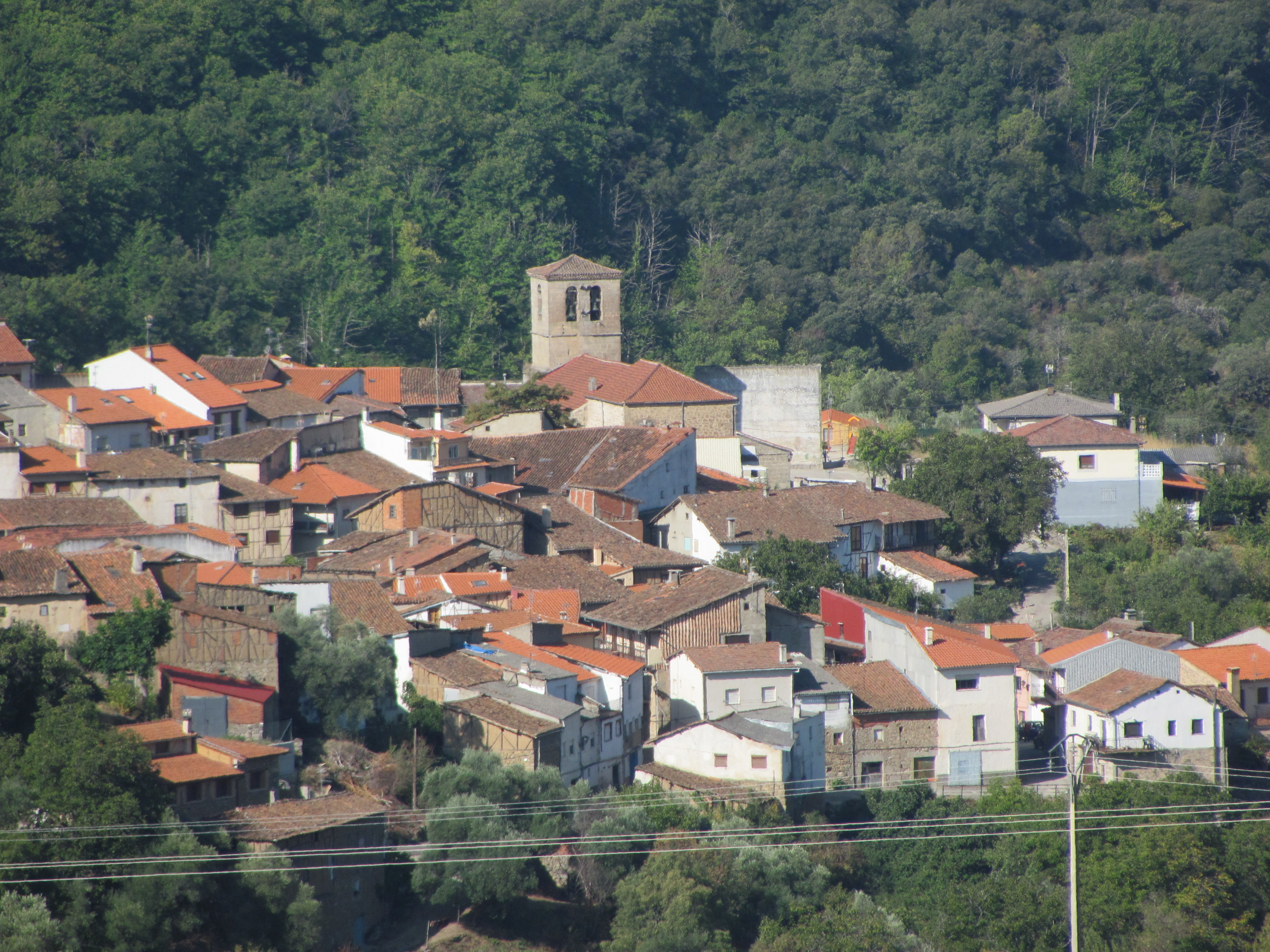

- Location in Salamanca
- Coordinates: 40°30′24″N 5°54′20″W
- Country: Spain
- Autonomous community: Castile and León
- Province: Salamanca
- Comarca: Sierra de Francia

Government
  - Mayor: Antonio Agustín Labrador Nieto (People's Party)

Area
  - Total: 21 km^{2} (8.1 sq mi)
- Elevation: 623 m (2,044 ft)

Population (2025-01-01)
  - Total: 343
  - Density: 16/km^{2} (42/sq mi)
- Time zone: UTC+1 (CET)
  - Summer (DST): UTC+2 (CEST)
- Postal code: 37671

San Esteban de la Sierra (Santisteban or simply San Esteban in local dialect) is a village and municipality in the province of Salamanca, western Spain, part of the autonomous community of Castile-Leon. It is located 65 kilometres from the provincial capital city of Salamanca and has a population of 340 people.

== History ==
San Esteban has written historical records from the 12th century, when some families came to the area looking for water to move their mills. Those families settled here and founded a Jewish quarter; the Christians refounded the Christian village upon the site of the old Jewish quarter emptied after the expulsion of the Jews and Muslims in the 15th century.

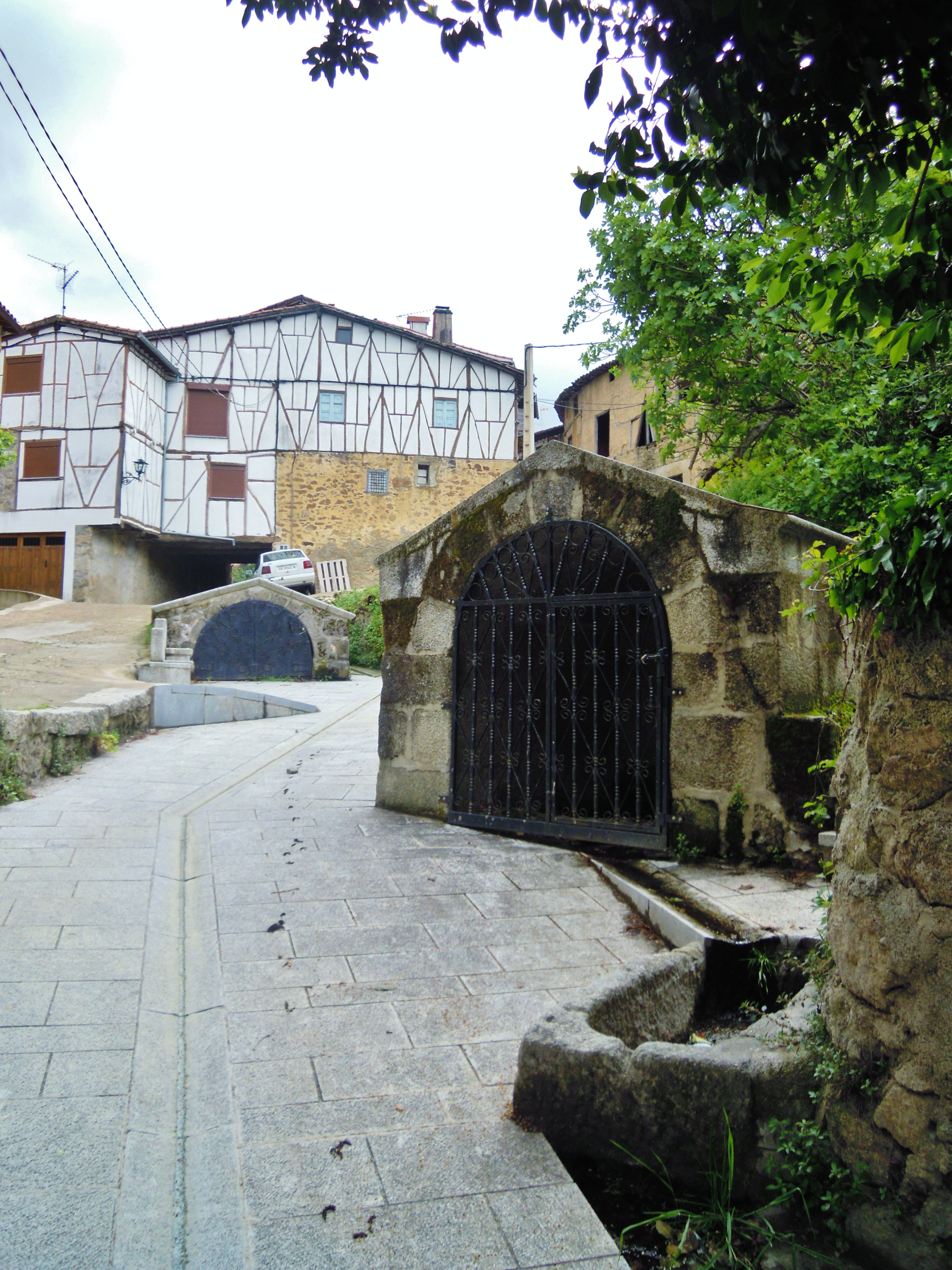

== Geography ==
San Esteban de la Sierra rests on a mountainside and is surrounded by several mountains, of which the mount Tiriñuelo stands out for giving its name to the local wine awarded with the 'Silver Ear' (a widely recognized prize for wines) in 1997.

The village owns an area of 22.4 km^{2}. Much of terrain is devoted to wine growing. San Estebán de la Sierra boasts about their wine quality, whose production is the main industrial local activity.

The lower part of the town is crossed by the river Alagón, which meanders through the mountains and finally flows into the Tagus. Its altitude is 623 metres above sea level.

== Language ==
The locals of San Esteban de la Sierra and the neighboring village of Santibañez de la Sierra used to speak a dialect of Leonese; however, this dialect is now extinct. Despite this fact, some Leonese traits remain. For example, some retained traits include:

- -e after /d/ or /t/
- the palatalization of l- and n-
- the preservation of the consonant group -mb-
- the aspiration of the Latin initial /F/ to convert it into /h~x/ (similar to the English /h/) – ḥelechu ('fern')
- the loss of the ending /R/ when an infinitive is before an enclitic pronoun – bebelu ('drink it')
- the addition of the article before the possessive adjective – la mi casa ('my house')

The preservation conditions of these traits are blurry and not easily perceptible in common speech. Perhaps the most perceptible traits are the deaf velar fricative aspiration and the implosive /s/. These are the most characteristic and contrast with the rest of the province of Salamanca's speech. People still retain some words dating from the Middle Ages from Mozarab and Basque origin. Due to the dialect's southern traits, it is considered to belong to the Extremaduran dialects stemming from the old Leonese language.

== Demography ==
According to the population census of 2011, there are 365 inhabitants, of which 187 are men and 178 are women in an area of 20.83 km^{2}.

Despite the decrease in population due to mass emigration to larger urban areas, the village's population increases significantly during holidays and feasts like Christmas, the Holy Week and the summer holidays.

== Feasts ==
Saint Agatha (February 5)

In this feast, some men are chosen as 'butlers' and they form couples that make use of local products to make traditional sweets and cakes like [[Perrunilla|perrunillas]] and [[Sacatrapos|sacatrapos]], and drinks like anisette. These products are offered to the neighbours on the eve of the feast day, whereas the 'butlers' go round the streets making requests to the saint and reciting poems telling the life of Saint Agatha. On February 5, there is a mass, and the 'butlers' in traditional costumes parade along the streets in procession; once the procession ends, 'the butlers' hold a banquet. The next day, the 'butlers' have lunch at the town hall, where a traditional dish called limón (lemon) is offered to the 'butlers'. The locals love this dish whose ingredients are lemon, orange, roasted meat, chorizo, fried egg, boiled egg, oil, pickle and wine.

Saint Stephen (August 3)

This feast is celebrated in tribute to the local patron saint giving the name to the village (San Esteban in Spanish) and used to be the primary local celebration; however this feast lost popularity because its date coincides with the harvest season, tremendously important for a primarily agricultural community. For this reason, the 'Feast of Christ' replaced this feast for being celebrated in September, just after the end of the wine harvest.

The feast is preserved thanks to the local winery cooperative company, which commemorates its foundation by organizing a banquet open to all the neighbours and tourists with parties and music afterwards. It is a small feast, but it is becoming more and more popular due to the tourists spending their summer holidays in the village.

The feast of Christ (September 4)

In this feast, people of all ages form peñas (party groups) and gather in rented or owned premises to feast and open their doors to the visitors for drinks and celebration. The feast starts with the proclamation of the Queens of the feast and her maids and the quema del castillo (literally the burning of the Castle). This tradition dates from the Middle Ages and is a game in which the young men climb up to the top of a branchless tree to stay hung on the top; in the meantime some bonfires with tall flames are burning below. The prize for the winner is smoked ham. People can enjoy parties, banquets, plays, orchestra music and activities of all sorts for five days. On the last day, a parade with floats is held, and later in the evening a bullfighting show is held at the Main Square. A final party is celebrated past midnight with wine, local products and music.

== Heritage ==
The village has experienced a diversification of its services in recent times. Some guest houses have been set up and new bars and restaurants have opened as well as natural product shops.

San Esteban has a range of different Romanesque medieval constructions such as the village chapel and the Church of St Stephen. Furthermore, there is a medieval bridge upon the river Alagón known as the Roman Bridge.

The village's current layout corresponds to the layout of the old Jewish quarter. The traditional local architecture is made up of old houses made from wood and adobe set on small streets intertwining one another. Much of the town is downhill, which shows visitors how near the river they are.

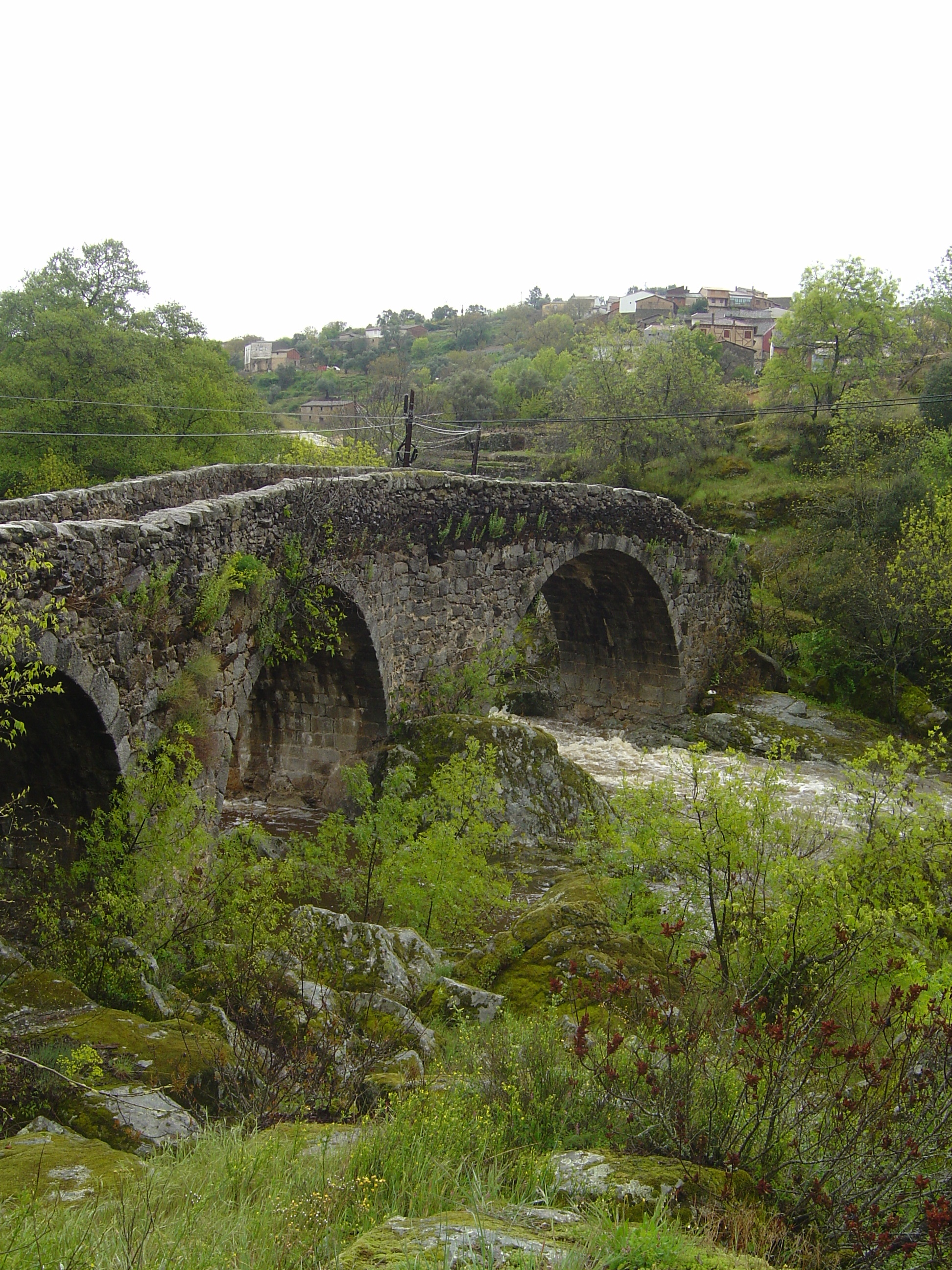

San Esteban de la Sierra is located in a valley with thick chestnut and eucalyptus forests and olive and wine crops on the foothills. The local environment is one of the primary assets because it attracts numerous hikers wishing to practise hiking across this valley.

The village is 20 km away from Sierra de Francia and is near other villages like San Martín del Castañar, La Alberca o Miranda del Castañar, Bejar and places like Peña de Francia.

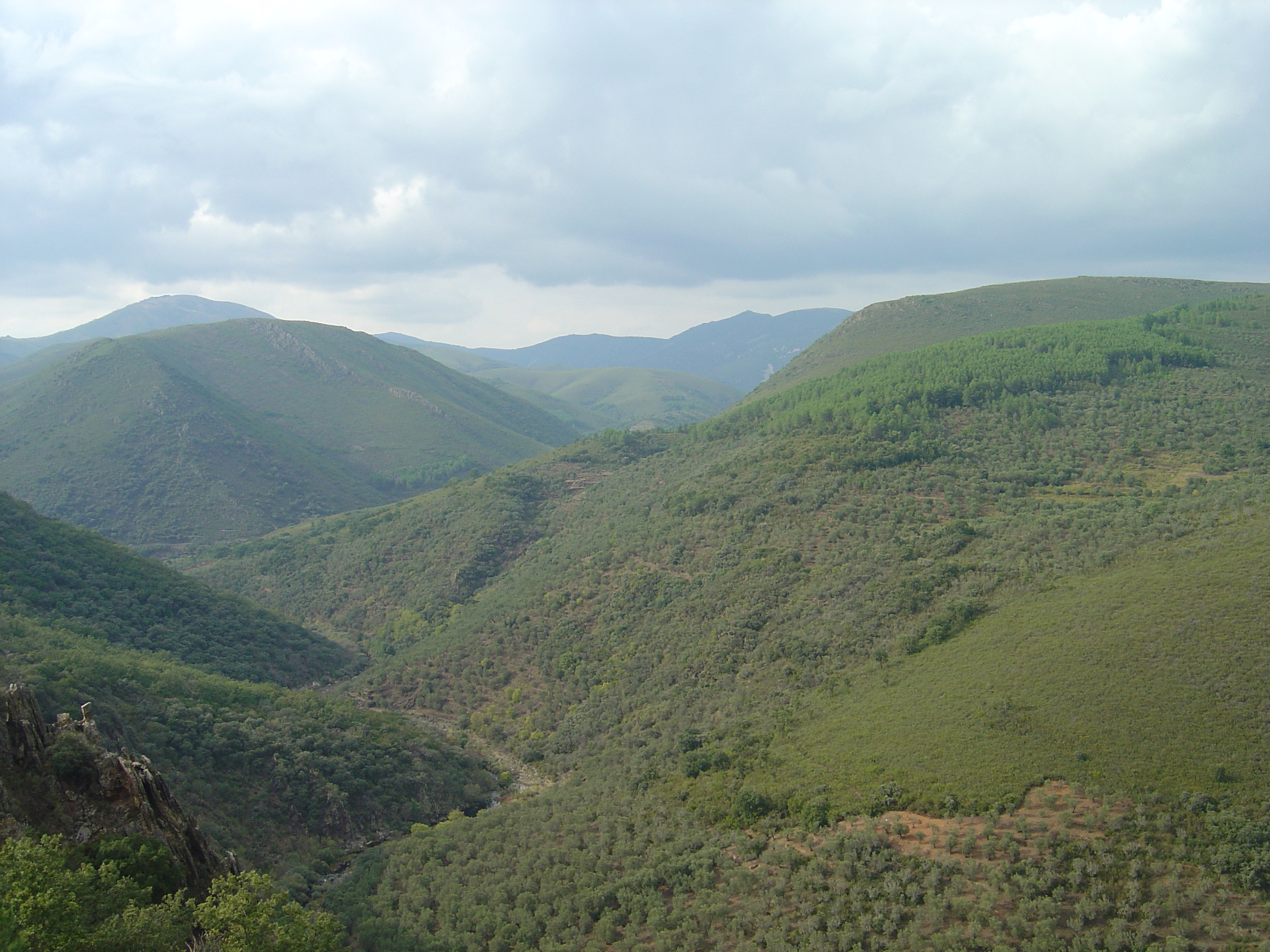

== See also ==
- Province of Salamanca
- Sierra de Francia
- Castile and León

== Bibliography ==
- Cea Gutiérrez, Antonio (1988). Consejo Superior de Investigaciones Científicas (ed.). "La Comunidad Judía en la Sierra de Francia" (PDF). Revista de Dialectología y Tradiciones Populares. Vol. XLIII, no. 1. pp. 53–102. ISSN 0034-7981.
