= List of Sites of Community Importance in Castile and León =

This is a list of Sites of Community Importance in Castile and León.

ID	Name	Coordinates	Image
ES0000003	Picos de Europa (official name: Picos de Europa); Other names: n/a	43.1526°N 4.9553°W	Looks like this Site of Community Interest has an image. Don't worry, you can take one of your own, and upload it too!
ES0000115	Hoces del Río Duratón (official name: Hoces del Río Duratón); Other names: n/a	41.3026°N 3.8442°W	Looks like this Site of Community Interest has an image. Don't worry, you can take one of your own, and upload it too!
ES0000116	Valle de Iruelas (official name: Valle de Iruelas); Other names: n/a	40.3816°N 4.5834°W	Looks like this Site of Community Interest has an image. Don't worry, you can take one of your own, and upload it too!
ES0000205	Lagunas del Canal de Castilla (official name: Lagunas del Canal de Castilla); Other names: n/a	42.1377°N 4.5494°W	Looks like this Site of Community Interest has an image. Don't worry, you can take one of your own, and upload it too!
ES0000210	Alto Sil (official name: Alto Sil); Other names: n/a	42.9171°N 6.3641°W	Looks like this Site of Community Interest has an image. Don't worry, you can take one of your own, and upload it too!
ES4110002	Sierra de Gredos (official name: Sierra de Gredos); Other names: n/a	40.2794°N 5.3385°W	Looks like this Site of Community Interest has an image. Don't worry, you can take one of your own, and upload it too!
ES4110020	Pinar de Hoyocasero (official name: Pinar de Hoyocasero); Other names: n/a	40.3894°N 4.9814°W	Looks like this Site of Community Interest has an image. Don't worry, you can take one of your own, and upload it too!
ES4110034	Sierra de la Paramera y Serrota (official name: Sierra de la Paramera y Serrota); Other names: n/a	40.4885°N 4.9817°W	Looks like this Site of Community Interest has an image. Don't worry, you can take one of your own, and upload it too!
ES4110078	Riberas del Río Alberche y afluentes (official name: Riberas del Río Alberche y afluentes); Other names: n/a	40.4171°N 4.6484°W	Looks like this Site of Community Interest has an image. Don't worry, you can take one of your own, and upload it too!
ES4110097	Campo Azálvaro - Pinares de Peguerinos (official name: Campo Azálvaro - Pinares de Peguerinos); Other names: n/a	40.6827°N 4.3361°W	Looks like this Site of Community Interest has an image. Don't worry, you can take one of your own, and upload it too!
ES4110103	Encinares de los ríos Adaja y Voltoya (official name: Encinares de los ríos Adaja y Voltoya); Other names: n/a	40.7499°N 4.6272°W	Looks like this Site of Community Interest has an image. Don't worry, you can take one of your own, and upload it too!
ES4110112	Encinares de la Sierra de Ávila (official name: Encinares de la Sierra de Ávila); Other names: n/a	40.6946°N 4.8776°W	Looks like this Site of Community Interest has an image. Don't worry, you can take one of your own, and upload it too!
ES4110113	Cerro de Guisando (official name: Cerro de Guisando); Other names: n/a	40.3595°N 4.4843°W	Looks like this Site of Community Interest has an image. Don't worry, you can take one of your own, and upload it too!
ES4110114	Pinares del Bajo Alberche (official name: Pinares del Bajo Alberche); Other names: n/a	40.515°N 4.4706°W	This Site of Community Interest has no photo. Take one and upload it! Thanks!
ES4110115	Valle del Tiétar (official name: Valle del Tiétar); Other names: n/a	40.2362°N 4.8759°W	Looks like this Site of Community Interest has an image. Don't worry, you can take one of your own, and upload it too!
ES4120025	Ojo Guareña (official name: Ojo Guareña); Other names: n/a	43.047°N 3.6202°W	Looks like this Site of Community Interest has an image. Don't worry, you can take one of your own, and upload it too!
ES4120028	Monte Santiago (official name: Monte Santiago); Other names: n/a	42.9632°N 3.0407°W	Looks like this Site of Community Interest has an image. Don't worry, you can take one of your own, and upload it too!
ES4120030	Montes Obarenes (official name: Montes Obarenes); Other names: n/a	42.7299°N 3.2339°W	Looks like this Site of Community Interest has an image. Don't worry, you can take one of your own, and upload it too!
ES4120049	Bosques del Valle de Mena (official name: Bosques del Valle de Mena); Other names: n/a	43.1259°N 3.3851°W	Looks like this Site of Community Interest has an image. Don't worry, you can take one of your own, and upload it too!
ES4120051	Riberas del Zadorra (official name: Riberas del Zadorra); Other names: n/a	42.7564°N 2.8372°W	Looks like this Site of Community Interest has an image. Don't worry, you can take one of your own, and upload it too!
ES4120052	Riberas del Ayuda (official name: Riberas del Ayuda); Other names: n/a	42.6829°N 2.6886°W	Looks like this Site of Community Interest has an image. Don't worry, you can take one of your own, and upload it too!
ES4120059	Riberas del Río Ebro y afluentes (official name: Riberas del Río Ebro y afluentes); Other names: n/a	42.7292°N 3.0088°W	Looks like this Site of Community Interest has an image. Don't worry, you can take one of your own, and upload it too!
ES4120066	Riberas del Río Nela y afluentes (official name: Riberas del Río Nela y afluentes); Other names: n/a	42.9155°N 3.5195°W	Looks like this Site of Community Interest has an image. Don't worry, you can take one of your own, and upload it too!
ES4120068	Riberas del Río Riaza (official name: Riberas del Río Riaza); Other names: n/a	41.6723°N 3.8794°W	Looks like this Site of Community Interest has an image. Don't worry, you can take one of your own, and upload it too!
ES4120071	Riberas del Río Arlanza y afluentes (official name: Riberas del Río Arlanza y afluentes); Other names: n/a	42.0543°N 3.3551°W	Looks like this Site of Community Interest has an image. Don't worry, you can take one of your own, and upload it too!
ES4120072	Riberas del Río Arlanzón y afluentes (official name: Riberas del Río Arlanzón y afluentes); Other names: n/a	42.4465°N 3.9373°W	Looks like this Site of Community Interest has an image. Don't worry, you can take one of your own, and upload it too!
ES4120073	Riberas del Río Oca y afluentes (official name: Riberas del Río Oca y afluentes); Other names: n/a	42.663°N 3.4337°W	Looks like this Site of Community Interest has an image. Don't worry, you can take one of your own, and upload it too!
ES4120075	Riberas del Río Tirón y afluentes (official name: Riberas del Río Tirón y afluentes); Other names: n/a	42.4075°N 3.0695°W	Looks like this Site of Community Interest has an image. Don't worry, you can take one of your own, and upload it too!
ES4120088	Montes de Valnera (official name: Montes de Valnera); Other names: n/a	43.1418°N 3.659°W	Looks like this Site of Community Interest has an image. Don't worry, you can take one of your own, and upload it too!
ES4120089	Hoces del Alto Ebro y Rudrón (official name: Hoces del Alto Ebro y Rudrón); Other names: n/a	42.791°N 3.7817°W	Looks like this Site of Community Interest has an image. Don't worry, you can take one of your own, and upload it too!
ES4120090	Embalse del Ebro - Monte Hijedo (official name: Embalse del Ebro - Monte Hijedo); Other names: n/a	42.9746°N 3.9159°W	Looks like this Site of Community Interest has an image. Don't worry, you can take one of your own, and upload it too!
ES4120091	Sabinares del Arlanza (official name: Sabinares del Arlanza); Other names: n/a	41.9826°N 3.443°W	Looks like this Site of Community Interest has an image. Don't worry, you can take one of your own, and upload it too!
ES4120092	Sierra de la Demanda (official name: Sierra de la Demanda); Other names: n/a	42.1611°N 3.1876°W	Looks like this Site of Community Interest has an image. Don't worry, you can take one of your own, and upload it too!
ES4120093	Humada-Peña Amaya (official name: Humada-Peña Amaya); Other names: n/a	42.64100000000001°N 4.0545°W	Looks like this Site of Community Interest has an image. Don't worry, you can take one of your own, and upload it too!
ES4120094	Sierra de la Tesla-Valdivielso (official name: Sierra de la Tesla-Valdivielso); Other names: n/a	42.8032°N 3.5326°W	Looks like this Site of Community Interest has an image. Don't worry, you can take one of your own, and upload it too!
ES4120095	Montes de Miranda de Ebro y Ameyugo (official name: Montes de Miranda de Ebro y Ameyugo); Other names: n/a	42.6408°N 2.9723°W	Looks like this Site of Community Interest has an image. Don't worry, you can take one of your own, and upload it too!
ES4130003	Picos de Europa en Castilla y León (official name: Picos de Europa en Castilla y León); Other names: n/a	42.9982°N 5.0508°W	Looks like this Site of Community Interest has an image. Don't worry, you can take one of your own, and upload it too!
ES4130010	Sierra de los Ancares (official name: Sierra de los Ancares); Other names: n/a	42.8166°N 6.7167°W	Looks like this Site of Community Interest has an image. Don't worry, you can take one of your own, and upload it too!
ES4130035	Valle de San Emiliano (official name: Valle de San Emiliano); Other names: n/a	42.9553°N 6.0205°W	Looks like this Site of Community Interest has an image. Don't worry, you can take one of your own, and upload it too!
ES4130037	Hoces de Vegacervera (official name: Hoces de Vegacervera); Other names: n/a	42.904°N 5.5401°W	Looks like this Site of Community Interest has an image. Don't worry, you can take one of your own, and upload it too!
ES4130038	Sierra de la Encina de la Lastra (official name: Sierra de la Encina de la Lastra); Other names: n/a	42.4977°N 6.8439999999999985°W	This Site of Community Interest has no photo. Take one and upload it! Thanks!
ES4130050	Montaña Central de León (official name: Montaña Central de León); Other names: n/a	42.9685°N 5.6467°W	This Site of Community Interest has no photo. Take one and upload it! Thanks!
ES4130065	Riberas del Río Órbigo y afluentes (official name: Riberas del Río Órbigo y afluentes); Other names: n/a	42.1005°N 5.7697°W	Looks like this Site of Community Interest has an image. Don't worry, you can take one of your own, and upload it too!
ES4130076	Riberas del Río Sil y afluentes (official name: Riberas del Río Sil y afluentes); Other names: n/a	42.533°N 6.9982°W	Looks like this Site of Community Interest has an image. Don't worry, you can take one of your own, and upload it too!
ES4130079	Riberas del Río Esla y afluentes (official name: Riberas del Río Esla y afluentes); Other names: n/a	42.025°N 5.6125°W	Looks like this Site of Community Interest has an image. Don't worry, you can take one of your own, and upload it too!
ES4130117	Montes Aquilanos y Sierra de Teleno (official name: Montes Aquilanos y Sierra de Teleno); Other names: n/a	42.3695°N 6.4667°W	Looks like this Site of Community Interest has an image. Don't worry, you can take one of your own, and upload it too!
ES4130137	Rebollares del Cea (official name: Rebollares del Cea); Other names: n/a	42.6333°N 5.0994°W	This Site of Community Interest has no photo. Take one and upload it! Thanks!
ES4130145	Lagunas de los Oteros (official name: Lagunas de los Oteros); Other names: n/a	42.2668°N 5.3253°W	This Site of Community Interest has no photo. Take one and upload it! Thanks!
ES4130149	Omaña (official name: Omaña); Other names: n/a	42.8134°N 6.184°W	Looks like this Site of Community Interest has an image. Don't worry, you can take one of your own, and upload it too!
ES4140011	Fuentes Carrionas y Fuente Cobre-Montaña Palentina (official name: Fuentes Carrionas y Fuente Cobre-Montaña Palentina); Other names: n/a	42.937°N 4.5759°W	Looks like this Site of Community Interest has an image. Don't worry, you can take one of your own, and upload it too!
ES4140026	Las Tuerces (official name: Las Tuerces); Other names: n/a	42.7461°N 4.2416°W	Looks like this Site of Community Interest has an image. Don't worry, you can take one of your own, and upload it too!
ES4140027	Covalagua (official name: Covalagua); Other names: n/a	42.7707°N 4.1202°W	Looks like this Site of Community Interest has an image. Don't worry, you can take one of your own, and upload it too!
ES4140053	Montes del Cerrato (official name: Montes del Cerrato); Other names: n/a	41.8815°N 4.0958°W	This Site of Community Interest has no photo. Take one and upload it! Thanks!
ES4140077	Riberas del Río Carrión y afluentes (official name: Riberas del Río Carrión y afluentes); Other names: n/a	42.18600000000001°N 4.5577°W	Looks like this Site of Community Interest has an image. Don't worry, you can take one of your own, and upload it too!
ES4140080	Canal de Castilla (official name: Canal de Castilla); Other names: n/a	42.4051°N 4.3067°W	Looks like this Site of Community Interest has an image. Don't worry, you can take one of your own, and upload it too!
ES4140082	Riberas del Río Pisuerga y afluentes (official name: Riberas del Río Pisuerga y afluentes); Other names: n/a	42.3517°N 4.1198°W	Looks like this Site of Community Interest has an image. Don't worry, you can take one of your own, and upload it too!
ES4140129	Montes Torozos y Páramos de Torquemada-Astudillo (official name: Montes Torozos y Páramos de Torquemada-Astudillo); Other names: n/a	41.7972°N 4.7973°W	Looks like this Site of Community Interest has an image. Don't worry, you can take one of your own, and upload it too!
ES4140136	Laguna de La Nava (official name: Laguna de La Nava); Other names: n/a	42.0637°N 4.7454°W	Looks like this Site of Community Interest has an image. Don't worry, you can take one of your own, and upload it too!
ES4150032	El Rebollar (official name: El Rebollar); Other names: n/a	40.3549°N 6.6213°W	Looks like this Site of Community Interest has an image. Don't worry, you can take one of your own, and upload it too!
ES4150064	Riberas de los Ríos Huebra, Yeltes, Uces y afluentes (official name: Riberas de los Ríos Huebra, Yeltes, Uces y afluentes); Other names: n/a	40.7877°N 6.4067°W	Looks like this Site of Community Interest has an image. Don't worry, you can take one of your own, and upload it too!
ES4150085	Riberas del Río Tormes y afluentes (official name: Riberas del Río Tormes y afluentes); Other names: n/a	40.7977°N 5.5262°W	Looks like this Site of Community Interest has an image. Don't worry, you can take one of your own, and upload it too!
ES4150096	Arribes del Duero (official name: Arribes del Duero); Other names: n/a	41.1843°N 6.5353°W	Looks like this Site of Community Interest has an image. Don't worry, you can take one of your own, and upload it too!
ES4150098	Campo de Argañán (official name: Campo de Argañán); Other names: n/a	40.6092°N 6.759°W	This Site of Community Interest has no photo. Take one and upload it! Thanks!
ES4150100	Campo de Azaba (official name: Campo de Azaba); Other names: n/a	40.51300000000001°N 6.7073°W	Looks like this Site of Community Interest has an image. Don't worry, you can take one of your own, and upload it too!
ES4150101	Candelario (official name: Candelario); Other names: n/a	40.3398°N 5.7625°W	Looks like this Site of Community Interest has an image. Don't worry, you can take one of your own, and upload it too!
ES4150107	Las Batuecas-Sierra de Francia (official name: Las Batuecas-Sierra de Francia); Other names: n/a	40.4775°N 6.12°W	Looks like this Site of Community Interest has an image. Don't worry, you can take one of your own, and upload it too!
ES4150108	Quilamas (official name: Quilamas); Other names: n/a	40.563°N 5.9905°W	Looks like this Site of Community Interest has an image. Don't worry, you can take one of your own, and upload it too!
ES4150121	Riberas del Río Alagón y afluentes (official name: Riberas del Río Alagón y afluentes); Other names: n/a	40.5035°N 5.949°W	Looks like this Site of Community Interest has an image. Don't worry, you can take one of your own, and upload it too!
ES4150125	Riberas del Río Agadón (official name: Riberas del Río Agadón); Other names: n/a	40.4971°N 6.4586°W	This Site of Community Interest has no photo. Take one and upload it! Thanks!
ES4150126	Valle del Cuerpo de Hombre (official name: Valle del Cuerpo de Hombre); Other names: n/a	40.3567°N 5.9037°W	Looks like this Site of Community Interest has an image. Don't worry, you can take one of your own, and upload it too!
ES4150127	Riberas del Río Águeda (official name: Riberas del Río Águeda); Other names: n/a	40.7137°N 6.6592°W	Looks like this Site of Community Interest has an image. Don't worry, you can take one of your own, and upload it too!
ES4160019	Sierra de Ayllón (official name: Sierra de Ayllón); Other names: n/a	41.2719°N 3.372°W	Looks like this Site of Community Interest has an image. Don't worry, you can take one of your own, and upload it too!
ES4160043	Cueva de los Murciélagos (official name: Cueva de los Murciélagos); Other names: n/a	41.0835°N 4.0368°W	This Site of Community Interest has no photo. Take one and upload it! Thanks!
ES4160058	Sabinares de Somosierra (official name: Sabinares de Somosierra); Other names: n/a	41.1711°N 3.6651°W	This Site of Community Interest has no photo. Take one and upload it! Thanks!
ES4160062	Lagunas de Coca y Olmedo (official name: Lagunas de Coca y Olmedo); Other names: n/a	41.2002°N 4.5807°W	This Site of Community Interest has no photo. Take one and upload it! Thanks!
ES4160063	Lagunas de Santa María la Real de Nieva (official name: Lagunas de Santa María la Real de Nieva); Other names: n/a	41.0114°N 4.3984°W	This Site of Community Interest has no photo. Take one and upload it! Thanks!
ES4160084	Riberas del Río Duratón (official name: Riberas del Río Duratón); Other names: n/a	41.2556°N 3.6437°W	Looks like this Site of Community Interest has an image. Don't worry, you can take one of your own, and upload it too!
ES4160104	Hoces del Río Riaza (official name: Hoces del Río Riaza); Other names: n/a	41.5289°N 3.5745°W	Looks like this Site of Community Interest has an image. Don't worry, you can take one of your own, and upload it too!
ES4160106	Lagunas de Cantalejo (official name: Lagunas de Cantalejo); Other names: n/a	41.2609°N 4.0353°W	Looks like this Site of Community Interest has an image. Don't worry, you can take one of your own, and upload it too!
ES4160109	Sierra de Guadarrama (official name: Sierra de Guadarrama); Other names: n/a	40.96°N 3.9513°W	Looks like this Site of Community Interest has an image. Don't worry, you can take one of your own, and upload it too!
ES4160111	Valles del Voltoya y el Zorita (official name: Valles del Voltoya y el Zorita); Other names: n/a	40.8518°N 4.3725°W	This Site of Community Interest has no photo. Take one and upload it! Thanks!
ES4160122	Sierra de Pradales (official name: Sierra de Pradales); Other names: n/a	41.4497°N 3.8028°W	Looks like this Site of Community Interest has an image. Don't worry, you can take one of your own, and upload it too!
ES4170029	Sabinares Sierra de Cabrejas (official name: Sabinares Sierra de Cabrejas); Other names: n/a	41.7546°N 2.8104°W	Looks like this Site of Community Interest has an image. Don't worry, you can take one of your own, and upload it too!
ES4170054	Oncala-Valtajeros (official name: Oncala-Valtajeros); Other names: n/a	41.9567°N 2.3162°W	Looks like this Site of Community Interest has an image. Don't worry, you can take one of your own, and upload it too!
ES4170055	Cigudosa-San Felices (official name: Cigudosa-San Felices); Other names: n/a	41.9134°N 2.0189°W	Looks like this Site of Community Interest has an image. Don't worry, you can take one of your own, and upload it too!
ES4170056	Sabinares de Ciria-Borobia (official name: Sabinares de Ciria-Borobia); Other names: n/a	41.6309°N 1.9492°W	Looks like this Site of Community Interest has an image. Don't worry, you can take one of your own, and upload it too!
ES4170057	Sabinares del Jalón (official name: Sabinares del Jalón); Other names: n/a	41.132°N 2.1781°W	Looks like this Site of Community Interest has an image. Don't worry, you can take one of your own, and upload it too!
ES4170083	Riberas del Río Duero y afluentes (official name: Riberas del Río Duero y afluentes); Other names: n/a	41.6718°N 3.8108°W	Looks like this Site of Community Interest has an image. Don't worry, you can take one of your own, and upload it too!
ES4170116	Sierras de Urbión y Cebollera (official name: Sierras de Urbión y Cebollera); Other names: n/a	41.9971°N 2.6347°W	Looks like this Site of Community Interest has an image. Don't worry, you can take one of your own, and upload it too!
ES4170119	Sierra del Moncayo (official name: Sierra del Moncayo); Other names: n/a	41.7737°N 1.8535°W	Looks like this Site of Community Interest has an image. Don't worry, you can take one of your own, and upload it too!
ES4170120	Páramo de Layna (official name: Páramo de Layna); Other names: n/a	41.1121°N 2.3681°W	Looks like this Site of Community Interest has an image. Don't worry, you can take one of your own, and upload it too!
ES4170135	Cañón del Río Lobos Natural Park (official name: Cañón del Río Lobos); Other names: n/a	41.786°N 3.1061°W	Looks like this Site of Community Interest has an image. Don't worry, you can take one of your own, and upload it too!
ES4170138	Quejigares y encinares de Sierra del Madero (official name: Quejigares y encinares de Sierra del Madero); Other names: n/a	41.7909°N 2.0891°W	This Site of Community Interest has no photo. Take one and upload it! Thanks!
ES4170139	Quejigares de Gómara-Nájima (official name: Quejigares de Gómara-Nájima); Other names: n/a	41.5114°N 2.1717°W	This Site of Community Interest has no photo. Take one and upload it! Thanks!
ES4170140	Robledales del Berrún (official name: Robledales del Berrún); Other names: n/a	41.8672°N 2.661°W	This Site of Community Interest has no photo. Take one and upload it! Thanks!
ES4170141	Pinar de Losana (official name: Pinar de Losana); Other names: n/a	41.2863°N 3.0513°W	This Site of Community Interest has no photo. Take one and upload it! Thanks!
ES4170142	Encinares de Tiermes (official name: Encinares de Tiermes); Other names: n/a	41.3716°N 3.1312°W	This Site of Community Interest has no photo. Take one and upload it! Thanks!
ES4170143	Encinares de Sierra del Costanazo (official name: Encinares de Sierra del Costanazo); Other names: n/a	41.5907°N 2.0833°W	This Site of Community Interest has no photo. Take one and upload it! Thanks!
ES4170144	Riberas del Río Cidacos y afluentes (official name: Riberas del Río Cidacos y afluentes); Other names: n/a	42.108°N 2.3205°W	Looks like this Site of Community Interest has an image. Don't worry, you can take one of your own, and upload it too!
ES4170148	Altos de Barahona (official name: Altos de Barahona); Other names: n/a	41.3185°N 2.7448°W	Looks like this Site of Community Interest has an image. Don't worry, you can take one of your own, and upload it too!
ES4180017	Riberas de Castronuño (official name: Riberas de Castronuño); Other names: n/a	41.444°N 5.2079°W	Looks like this Site of Community Interest has an image. Don't worry, you can take one of your own, and upload it too!
ES4180069	Riberas del Río Cea (official name: Riberas del Río Cea); Other names: n/a	42.2412°N 5.1666°W	Looks like this Site of Community Interest has an image. Don't worry, you can take one of your own, and upload it too!
ES4180070	Riberas del Río Cega (official name: Riberas del Río Cega); Other names: n/a	41.4974°N 4.7145°W	Looks like this Site of Community Interest has an image. Don't worry, you can take one of your own, and upload it too!
ES4180081	Riberas del Río Adaja y afluentes (official name: Riberas del Río Adaja y afluentes); Other names: n/a	41.3321°N 4.6304°W	Looks like this Site of Community Interest has an image. Don't worry, you can take one of your own, and upload it too!
ES4180124	Salgüeros de Aldeamayor (official name: Salgüeros de Aldeamayor); Other names: n/a	41.5257°N 4.6711°W	Looks like this Site of Community Interest has an image. Don't worry, you can take one of your own, and upload it too!
ES4180130	El Carrascal (official name: El Carrascal); Other names: n/a	41.5895°N 4.3531°W	Looks like this Site of Community Interest has an image. Don't worry, you can take one of your own, and upload it too!
ES4180147	Humedales de Los Arenales (official name: Humedales de Los Arenales); Other names: n/a	41.2853°N 4.8591°W	This Site of Community Interest has no photo. Take one and upload it! Thanks!
ES4190033	Sierra de la Culebra (official name: Sierra de la Culebra); Other names: n/a	41.9196°N 6.359°W	Looks like this Site of Community Interest has an image. Don't worry, you can take one of your own, and upload it too!
ES4190060	Tejedelo (official name: Tejedelo); Other names: n/a	42.0204°N 6.7923°W	Looks like this Site of Community Interest has an image. Don't worry, you can take one of your own, and upload it too!
ES4190061	Quejigares de la Tierra del Vino (official name: Quejigares de la Tierra del Vino); Other names: n/a	41.294°N 5.7318°W	This Site of Community Interest has no photo. Take one and upload it! Thanks!
ES4190067	Riberas del Río Tera y afluentes (official name: Riberas del Río Tera y afluentes); Other names: n/a	41.9594°N 5.7908°W	Looks like this Site of Community Interest has an image. Don't worry, you can take one of your own, and upload it too!
ES4190074	Riberas del Río Aliste y afluentes (official name: Riberas del Río Aliste y afluentes); Other names: n/a	41.676°N 6.082999999999998°W	Looks like this Site of Community Interest has an image. Don't worry, you can take one of your own, and upload it too!
ES4190102	Cañones del Duero (official name: Cañones del Duero); Other names: n/a	41.4525°N 5.9656°W	Looks like this Site of Community Interest has an image. Don't worry, you can take one of your own, and upload it too!
ES4190105	Lago de Sanabria y alrededores (official name: Lago de Sanabria y alrededores); Other names: n/a	42.1491°N 6.8197°W	Looks like this Site of Community Interest has an image. Don't worry, you can take one of your own, and upload it too!
ES4190110	Sierra de la Cabrera (official name: Sierra de la Cabrera); Other names: n/a	42.2043°N 6.5624°W	Looks like this Site of Community Interest has an image. Don't worry, you can take one of your own, and upload it too!
ES4190131	Riberas del Río Tuela y afluentes (official name: Riberas del Río Tuela y afluentes); Other names: n/a	42.0333°N 6.8998°W	Looks like this Site of Community Interest has an image. Don't worry, you can take one of your own, and upload it too!
ES4190132	Riberas del Río Manzanas y afluentes (official name: Riberas del Río Manzanas y afluentes); Other names: n/a	41.7049°N 6.4141°W	Looks like this Site of Community Interest has an image. Don't worry, you can take one of your own, and upload it too!
ES4190133	Campo Alto de Aliste (official name: Campo Alto de Aliste); Other names: n/a	41.8229°N 6.3667°W	Looks like this Site of Community Interest has an image. Don't worry, you can take one of your own, and upload it too!
ES4190134	Lagunas de Tera y Vidriales (official name: Lagunas de Tera y Vidriales); Other names: n/a	42.0158°N 5.9812°W	This Site of Community Interest has no photo. Take one and upload it! Thanks!
ES4190146	Lagunas y pastizales salinos de Villafáfila (official name: Lagunas y pastizales salinos de Villafáfila); Other names: n/a	41.8373°N 5.5927°W	Looks like this Site of Community Interest has an image. Don't worry, you can take one of your own, and upload it too!

== See also ==
- List of Sites of Community Importance in Spain
