= Serrano dialect =

The Serrano dialect is an Asturleonese dialect spoken in Sierra de Francia, Salamanca (Spain).

Speech in Sierra de Francia is split up into two forms: northern dialects, which are closer to Castilian, and southern dialects, with more Extremaduran characteristics. Serrano dialects form part of Eastern Astur-Leonese, which are transitional varieties between Asturleonese and Castilian.
