= Luis Jerónimo of Uztáriz and Hemiaga =

Spanish economist of the 18th century

- Luis Jerónimo de Uztáriz y Hermiaga
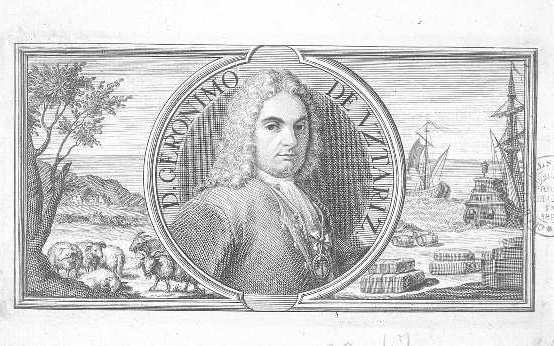
- Retrato de Gerónimo Uztariz-Anónimo siglo XVIII-Madrid 1757
- Born: 1670; Doneztebe (Santesteban or Sant-Esteban), Pamplona, Navarre, Spain
- Died: January 31, 1732 (aged 61–62)
- Resting place: The Church of Santa Maria de la Almudena.
- Spouse(s): María Francisca of Azuara and Candía

Luis Jerónimo of Uztáriz and Hemiaga (1670–1724), Knight of Santiago, was a Spanish politician and economist who focused on reinventing the economic landscape of the Spanish nation after the extravagance of the Austrian Dynasty had exhausted the wealth of the country and left Spain in penury. He is best known for his book Theory and Practice of Commerce and Maritime Affairs, which was first published in Spain - in 1724, and has been translated into 3 different languages French, Italian and English.

== Early life ==
Luis Jerónimo of Uztáriz and Hemiaga was born in 1670 in the town of Santesteban of Leon, in the Northern community of Navarre. He was the second child of a marriage that had seven offspring from the marriage of Juan of Uztáriz (He owned the solar houses of Uztáriz and Aurtiz and Mayor of his town in 1679) and María of Hermiaga. According to Basque's law of inheritance, which influenced the drafting of the Navarrese Fueros and the customs of the kingdom of Navarre, accords the whole inheritance of the family to the eldest child, regardless of the sex. This prompted Jerónimo to move out to Madrid, at the age of 15, where he lived with relatives, being the second son with no rights to inheritance. This was the beginning of his successful military career.

== Personal life ==
In 1696, he married Maria of Azuara and Sesseguen in Brussels, a noble Flemish descendant of a family of soldiers serving in Spain from a century ago. They had two children, Marquis of Uztáriz Casimiro de Uztáriz y Azuara (He also like his father, was a Knight and Commander of the Military Order of Santiago and Secretary of the Royal Councils of State and War) and Luis Jerónimo de Uztáriz y Azuara.

== Life in the Army and Public Administration ==
In 1688, he was a soldier in the Spanish Army of Flanders and fought for about 10 years in the Augsburg League War. During these years, he ascended to the rank of field master. He participated in 8 campaigns, including the Siege of Namur and the Battle of Landen (1693), in which Uztáriz was taken prisoner. In 1697 he went briefly to Spain after the end of the war, before returning to The Flemish Region of Belgium (or Flanders).

Between 1698 and 1704 he was secretary of Isidoro de la Cueva y Benavides, the Marquess of Bedmar, governor and commander of the Spanish army in Flanders. He outlived the outbreak of the War of Spanish Successions. In 1704 the Marquis was appointed Viceroy of Sicily and Jerónimo followed him, where he served as Secretary of State and War. During his stay in Sicily, he was made a Knight of Santiago. Under the command of the Marquis de Bedmar, he showed not only great administrative but political skills, where he served as Senior Officer of the Royal Secretariat and Secretary in the Council of the Indies.

In 1707, he finally returned to Spain, where he began a career in state administration. He was successively appointed Minister of War, Secretary of the Council of Commerce and Finance and the Secretary of the Board of Trade and the Mint. In 1725 he carried out the reorganization of the Board of Commerce and was appointed secretary by vote.

When the Board of Commerce was founded with that of Currency, he was elected Minister of the ministry. He had a great influence on the economic policy of Felipe V.

== Later life ==
Jerónimo died on January 31, 1732, in Madrid and was buried in the Church of Santa Maria de la Almudena.

== Work ==
His interest in economic problems was first demonstrated in a concrete form when he wrote an approbation of a book entitled, The Commerce of Holland, translated into Spanish in 1717, in which he gave an account of the economic decrees formulated by Louis XIV with the advice of his minister, Colbert. He advocated the application of these decrees, called Colbertism, in Spain as a standard to imitate France and The Netherlands.

As an economist Uztariz is known chiefly for his principal work, published in 1724, Theorica y Practica de Comercio y de Marina, or, translated into English, Theory and Practice of Commerce and Maritime Affairs, in which he set forth his economic conceptions of commerce, manufactures, taxation, and navigation, and the means by which he proposed to restore the lost power and wealth of Spain. His work earned him the rare distinction of being the only man in the different councils of his Majesty well-versed in the economic problems of the day. Through his work, he elicited favourable comments from some of his prominent contemporaries, 2 and is regarded by some writers as "the first Spaniard that has made a name in Political Economy". 3 He discussed at great length and with fearlessness the economic state of Spain, demonstrating an erudition surpassed by only a few. His great amount of information on the trade and navigation of Spain impressed the king, and when the post of Secretary of the Board of Trade became vacant in 1724, Uztariz was recognized as the logical man to fill the vacancy. When the Board of Trade was united with the Board of the Mint three years later, he was again honoured with an appointment as secretary. It was in this capacity that he exerted his greatest influence upon the commercial policies of his country, initiating numerous reforms in the organization of the Board and making the department a source of reliable information about the condition of trade within the Peninsula.

His services were not confined to the routine of his office as secretary of the Board of Trade and the Mint; on several occasions, he was called upon to conduct an investigation and a study of certain public problems of economic significance. On one occasion, April 18, 1727, he was called by the Prime Minister, Patifio, to make a study of the royal cloth factory in the city of Guadalajara, and as a result of this study he put out a report entitled, D. Jeronimo de Uztaris Represdo Lo Que Sele Ofrece, Obedeciendo la Orden de S. Illma Sobre Haver Reconocido la Fabrica Royal de Panos de la Ciudad De Guadalaxara. In his manuscript, he discussed the causes of the industry's decay and suggested remedies to restore it to a profitable basis. A few months later the Prime Minister again called upon our author to determine the amount of cloth in the factory of Guadalajara and in the royal warehouse in Madrid. In connection with this investigation, he published another report entitled, Resumen De Las Prezas de Paho Que Exist en En La Fdbrica de Guadalajara y En El Alinacen de Madrid Hasta 15 de Diz. de 1727 Segun Parece De Las Dos Rclaciones Adjuntos.

=== Theory and Practice of Commerce and Maritime Affairs ===
The work titled, Theorica, y Practica de Comercio, y de Marina, en Differentes Discursos, y Calificados Exempt ares, Que, Con Especificas Providencias, Se Procuran Adaptor a la Monorchia Espanola Para su Prompta Restauracion, Beneficio Universal, y Mayor Fortalesa Contra los Emulos de la Real Corona: Mcdiante la Soberana Proteccion Del Rey Nuestro Senor Don Phclipe V, was first published in 1724 and was dedicated to Philip V, the first of the Bourbons. The importance of the work may be gleaned from the fact that, six years after his death and with extended notes from his son, Casemiro, it was translated into three languages, namely, English, French and Italian. The English translation was made by John Kippax in London in 1751, and a second English translation by George Faulkner in Dublin in 1752. It was translated into French by Forbonnais in 1753, and into Italian in 1793.

The work was published at a very inopportune time when Spain was groaning from the effects of centuries of uninterrupted decline dating from the second half of the sixteenth century. The book was read by the nations of Europe under the spell of the mercantilists, and the ideas enunciated were a warning note to the rivals of Spain in world trade. The author's bold and unmasked attacks and scathing criticisms of the economic order of his time so ably presented in the work and the reforms suggested, which ran counter to the prevailing practice, forced the court of Madrid to suppress its circulation; the book, therefore, was read by only a few intimate but nevertheless influential friends. Meanwhile, the author was heralded and esteemed as a great and fearless reformer and was accordingly showered by his compatriots with honours and praises which he fully deserved. Uztariz is also the only Spanish economist cited by Adam Smith in The Wealth of Nations (1776).

In this work, he identified national wealth with precious metals but adds that the main thing is not to prevent the leakage of these metals through restrictions but to make them enter and stay through a favourable trade balance. The general remedy is the promotion of manufacturing and the reorganization of trade. A nation cannot be large without a large trade, and a useful trade is impossible without the possession of manufactures. To obtain these, government support is necessary, expressed in the concession of franchises to manufacturers and sellers. At the same time, a reduction in internal levies, accompanied by a reorganization of the tariffs for the entry and exit of merchandise, would increase domestic consumption and exports, since excessive duties paid in the Peninsula and customs made Spanish products more expensive. However, restrictions on the entry of these products should be carried out in conjunction with the development of the national industry, so as not to cause shortages.

For Ustáriz, the cause of the Spanish decline was not emigration to the Indies, but unfavourable trade. He was in favour of promoting private industry. The creation of trade companies was not considered effective for the development of Spanish foreign trade. He requested that Spanish commercial representations be established in the main foreign ports. It requested the reform of the Board of Commerce, with the introduction of professional and experienced men. He advocated the opening of river channels and the improvement of roads and ports. He recommended the creation of academies to promote commerce and science and arts in general.
