= Alagón =

Alagón may refer to:

- Alagón (river), a river in Spain, tributary of the Tagus
- Alagón, Zaragoza, a municipality in Spain
