= Herguijuela de la Sierra =

- Municipality
- Coat of arms

- Location in Salamanca
- Coordinates: 40°26′1″N 6°4′0″W
- Country: Spain
- Autonomous community: Castile and León
- Province: Salamanca
- Comarca: Sierra de Francia

Government
  - Mayor: Rafael Rivero Sánchez

Area
  - Total: 32 km^{2} (12 sq mi)
- Elevation: 648 m (2,126 ft)

Population (2025-01-01)
  - Total: 222
  - Density: 6.9/km^{2} (18/sq mi)
- Time zone: UTC+1 (CET)
  - Summer (DST): UTC+2 (CEST)
- Postal code: 37619

Herguijuela de la Sierra is a village and municipality in the province of Salamanca, western Spain, part of the autonomous community of Castilla y León. It is located 86 kilometres (53 mi) from the provincial capital city of Salamanca and has a population of 300 people. It is known, besides for its and other towns in the area's quaint old village air, for having a several-hundred-year-old beech tree nearby, one of two in all of western-central Spain.

== Geography ==
The municipality covers an area of 32 square kilometres (12 sq mi). It lies 800 metres (2,600 ft) above sea level and the postal code is 37619. The Sierra de Francia Park is situated in the municipality.
