= Navarredonda de la Rinconada =

- Municipality
- Location in Salamanca
- Coordinates: 40°36′24″N 6°0′24″W
- Country: Spain
- Autonomous community: Castile and León
- Province: Salamanca
- Comarca: Sierra de Francia

Government
  - Mayor: Fermín González Sánchez (PSOE)

Area
  - Total: 13 km^{2} (5.0 sq mi)
- Elevation: 1,026 m (3,366 ft)

Population (2025-01-01)
  - Total: 153
  - Density: 12/km^{2} (30/sq mi)
- Time zone: UTC+1 (CET)
  - Summer (DST): UTC+2 (CEST)
- Postal code: 37607

Navarredonda de la Rinconada, part of the autonomous community of Castile-Leon, is a village and municipality in the western province of Salamanca in Spain. It is located 68 kilometres (42 mi) from the provincial capital city of Salamanca and has a population of 185 people.

== Geography ==
The municipality covers an area of 13 km^{2} (5.0 sq mi) and lies 1,026 metres (3,366 ft) above sea level and the postal code is 37607.

== See also ==
- List of municipalities in Salamanca
