= Molinillo, Spain =

Molinillo
- Municipality
- Location in Salamanca

- Location in Spain
- Coordinates: 40°28′8″N 5°56′42″W
- Country: Spain
- Autonomous community: Castile and León
- Province: Salamanca
- Comarca: Sierra de Francia

Government
  - Mayor: Ricardo Ramírez Ceballos (PSOE)

Area
  - Total: 7 km^{2} (2.7 sq mi)
- Elevation: 723 m (2,372 ft)

Population (2025-01-01)
  - Total: 43
  - Density: 6.1/km^{2} (16/sq mi)
- Time zone: UTC+1 (CET)
  - Summer (DST): UTC+2 (CEST)
- Website: www.emolinillo.es

Molinillo is a municipality located in the province of Salamanca, Castile and León, Spain. As of 2016 the municipality has a population of 52 inhabitants.

Historical population

Year	Pop.	±%
1900	233	—
1910	241	+3.4%
1920	226	−6.2%
1930	246	+8.8%
1940	303	+23.2%
1950	289	−4.6%
1960	252	−12.8%

Year	Pop.	±%
1970	126	−50.0%
1979	144	+14.3%
1981	99	−31.2%
1995	92	−7.1%
1996	80	−13.0%
1998	72	−10.0%
1999	107	+48.6%

Year	Pop.	±%
2000	82	−23.4%
2001	81	−1.2%
2002	80	−1.2%
2003	75	−6.2%
2004	70	−6.7%
2005	68	−2.9%
2006	67	−1.5%
