= San Miguel de Valero =

- Municipality
- Location in Salamanca
- Coordinates: 40°32′N 5°55′W
- Country: Spain
- Autonomous community: Castile and León
- Province: Salamanca
- Comarca: Sierra de Francia

Government
  - Mayor: Manuel Oliva Rodríguez (People's Party)

Area
  - Total: 29 km^{2} (11 sq mi)
- Elevation: 940 m (3,080 ft)

Population (2025-01-01)
  - Total: 308
  - Density: 11/km^{2} (28/sq mi)
- Time zone: UTC+1 (CET)
  - Summer (DST): UTC+2 (CEST)
- Postal code: 37763

San Miguel de Valero is a municipality located in the province of Salamanca, Castile and León, Spain. As of 2016, the municipality had a population of 338 inhabitants.
