= La Bastida =

- Municipality
- Location in Salamanca
- Coordinates: 40°35′6″N 6°3′31″W
- Country: Spain
- Autonomous community: Castile and León
- Province: Salamanca
- Comarca: Sierra de Francia

Government
  - Mayor: Bienvenido Rodríguez Rodríguez (PSOE)

Area
  - Total: 19 km^{2} (7.3 sq mi)
- Elevation: 1,114 m (3,655 ft)

Population (2025-01-01)
  - Total: 22
  - Density: 1.2/km^{2} (3.0/sq mi)
- Time zone: UTC+1 (CET)
  - Summer (DST): UTC+2 (CEST)

La Bastida is a municipality located in the province of Salamanca, Castile and León, Spain.
