= Aldeanueva de la Sierra =

- municipality
- Flag

- Location in Salamanca

- Location in Spain
- Coordinates: 40°36′53″N 6°05′45″W
- Country: Spain
- Autonomous community: Castile and León
- Province: Salamanca
- Comarca: Sierra de Francia

Government
  - Mayor: José Antonio Montero García (PSOE)

Area
  - Total: 15 km^{2} (5.8 sq mi)
- Elevation: 981 m (3,219 ft)

Population (2025-01-01)
  - Total: 88
  - Density: 5.9/km^{2} (15/sq mi)
- Time zone: UTC+1 (CET)
  - Summer (DST): UTC+2 (CEST)
- Postal code: 37691

Aldeanueva de la Sierra is a village and municipality in the province of Salamanca, western Spain, part of the autonomous community of Castile and León. It is located 61 kilometres (38 mi) from the city of Salamanca and has a population of 110 people. The municipality has an area of 15 km^{2} (5.8 sq mi).

The village lies 981 metres (3,219 ft) above sea level.
