= La Rinconada de la Sierra =

- Municipality
- Location in Salamanca
- Coordinates: 40°37′1″N 6°1′0″W
- Country: Spain
- Autonomous community: Castile and León
- Province: Salamanca
- Comarca: Sierra de Francia

Government
  - Mayor: Maríano García Rodríguez (People's Party)

Area
  - Total: 13 km^{2} (5.0 sq mi)
- Elevation: 1,000 m (3,300 ft)

Population (2025-01-01)
  - Total: 97
  - Density: 7.5/km^{2} (19/sq mi)
- Time zone: UTC+1 (CET)
  - Summer (DST): UTC+2 (CEST)
- Postal code: 37607

La Rinconada de la Sierra is a village and municipality in the province of Salamanca, western Spain, part of the autonomous community of Castile-Leon. It is located 57 kilometres (35 mi) from the provincial capital city of Salamanca and has a population of 120 people.

== Geography ==
The municipality covers an area of 13 km^{2} (5.0 sq mi). It lies 1,000 metres (3,300 ft) above sea level. The postal code is 37607.

== See also ==
- List of municipalities in Salamanca
