= Linares de Riofrío =

- Municipality
- Coat of arms

- Location in Salamanca
- Coordinates: 40°35′3″N 5°55′15″W
- Country: Spain
- Autonomous community: Castile and León
- Province: Salamanca
- Comarca: Sierra de Francia

Government
  - Mayor: Ignacio Polo Escudero (People's Party)

Area
  - Total: 28 km^{2} (11 sq mi)
- Elevation: 956 m (3,136 ft)

Population (2025-01-01)
  - Total: 924
  - Density: 33/km^{2} (85/sq mi)
- Time zone: UTC+1 (CET)
  - Summer (DST): UTC+2 (CEST)
- Postal code: 37760

Linares de Riofrío is a municipality located in the province of Salamanca, Castile and León, Spain. As of 2016 the municipality has a population of 990 inhabitants.

== Geography ==
Linares de Riofrío is located in the Sierra de Francia-Quilamas-La Calería region. The highest point in the municipality is the Mojón del Marrano peak, at an elevation of 1,383 m. Another point of interest is the Sierra Chica, at 1,258 m.

== Celebrations ==
In Linares de Riofrío, there are several festivals, the most important of which are Lunes de Aguas, celebrated on the second Monday after Easter Sunday, and Nuestra Señora de la Asunción, on August 15. In addition to these, there is the traditional strawberry festival, which usually takes place on the first weekend in June, and the hunting and fishing fair, dedicated primarily to hunting and fishing.
