= Miranda del Castañar =

- Municipality
- Flag Coat of arms

- Location in Salamanca
- Coordinates: 40°29′3″N 5°59′50″W
- Country: Spain
- Autonomous community: Castile and León
- Province: Salamanca
- Comarca: Sierra de Francia

Government
  - Mayor: Encarnacion Torija Gutiérrez (People's Party)

Area
  - Total: 21 km^{2} (8.1 sq mi)
- Elevation: 649 m (2,129 ft)

Population (2025-01-01)
  - Total: 361
  - Density: 17/km^{2} (45/sq mi)
- Time zone: UTC+1 (CET)
  - Summer (DST): UTC+2 (CEST)
- Postal code: 37660

Miranda del Castañar is a municipality located in the province of Salamanca, Castile and León, Spain. As of 2016 the municipality has a population of 426 inhabitants.

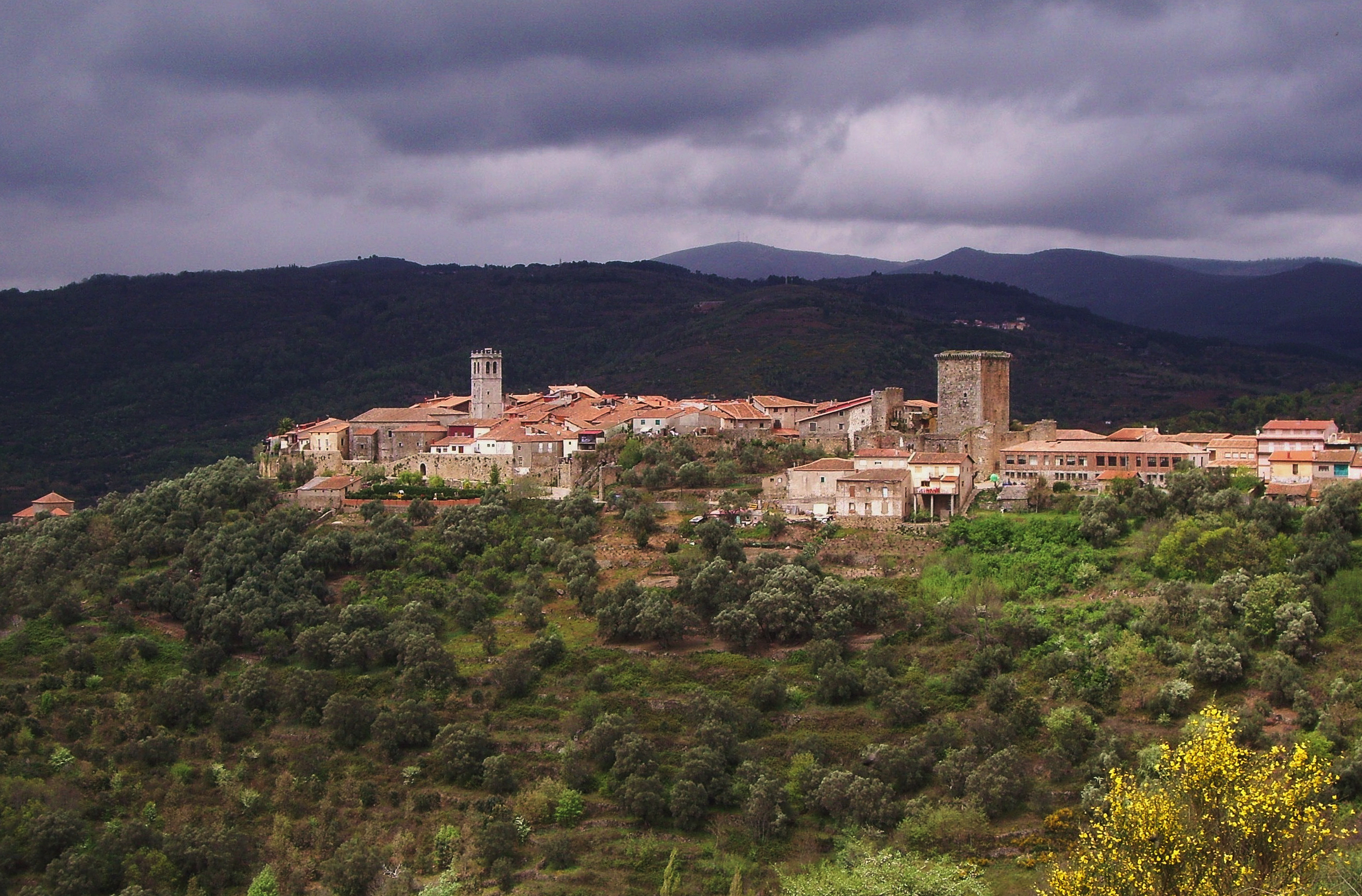
Panoramic view of the town

The town of Miranda del Castañar is labeled "Historic-Artistic Grouping" for being part of the Spanish national system of heritage listing. The town is set on a mountainside and is encircled by a medieval wall with four gates. To the south and the east stand the Gates of Saint Postigo and Saint Genesius respectively. To the west stands the Gate of Nuestra Señora de la Cuesta (Our Lady of the slope), the town's patron saint whose festivity is celebrated on either 8 or 9 September. Finally, the Town Gate stands in the north. The most noteworthy monument is the Castle of Miranda del Castañar.

The current castle was rebuilt in the early 14th century over the remains of an older castle dating from the 12th. There is a coat of arms belonging to the House of Zuñiga engraved in the westernmost part of the castle. Some parts well preserved are the castle wall, a parapet walk, and some footbridges. The Castle is eyewitness to a past splendor time. The town was founded in the 12th century by the Sovereign Hospitaller Order of Saint John of Jerusalem and was reinforced by the repopulating carried out by the king Alfonso IX of León in the 13th century. Currently, the castle belongs to the town council, but it first belonged to the Duchess of Alba, who also owns the title of Countess of Miranda del Castañar and donated the castle to the town council in 1954.

== Heritage ==
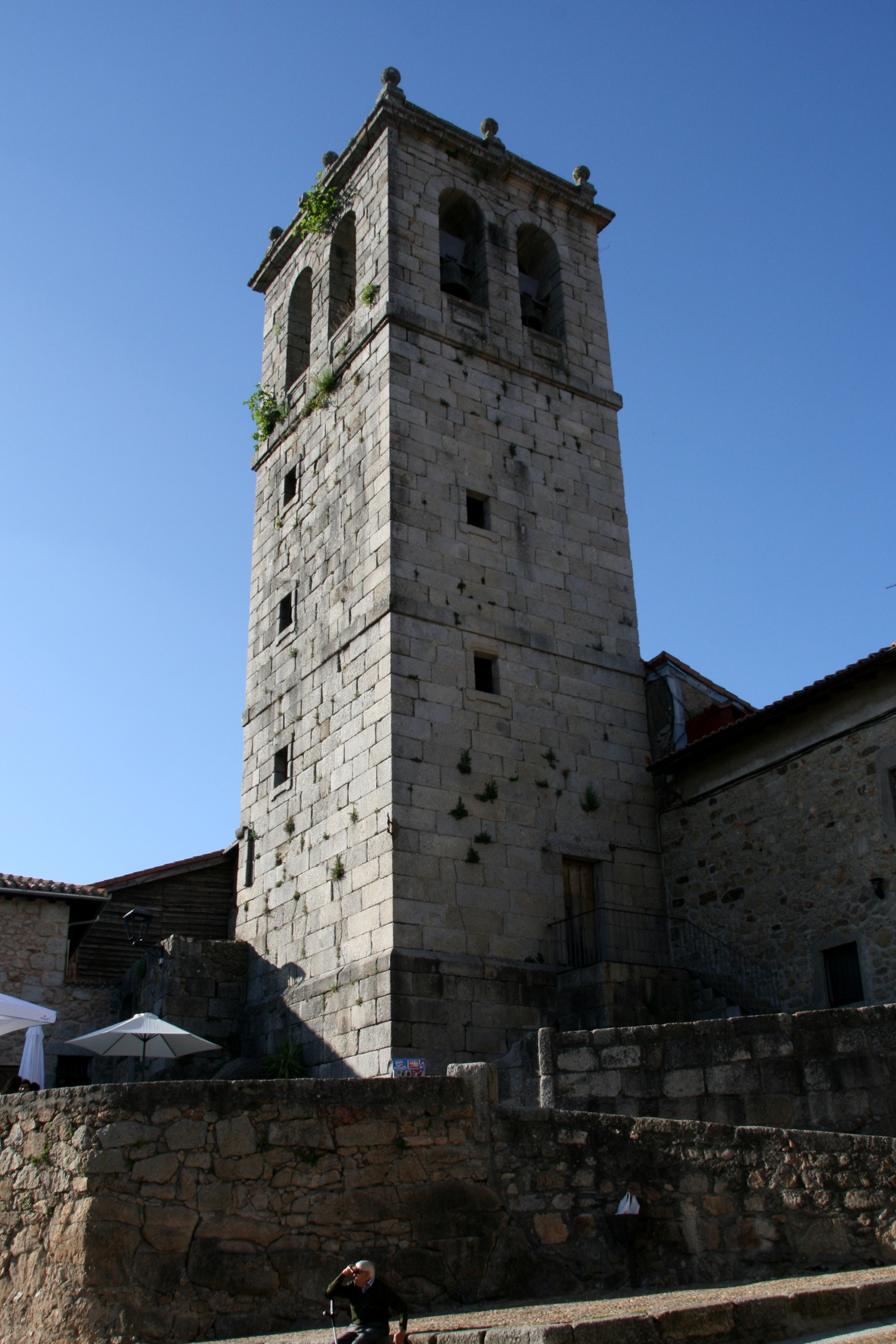
Parish church

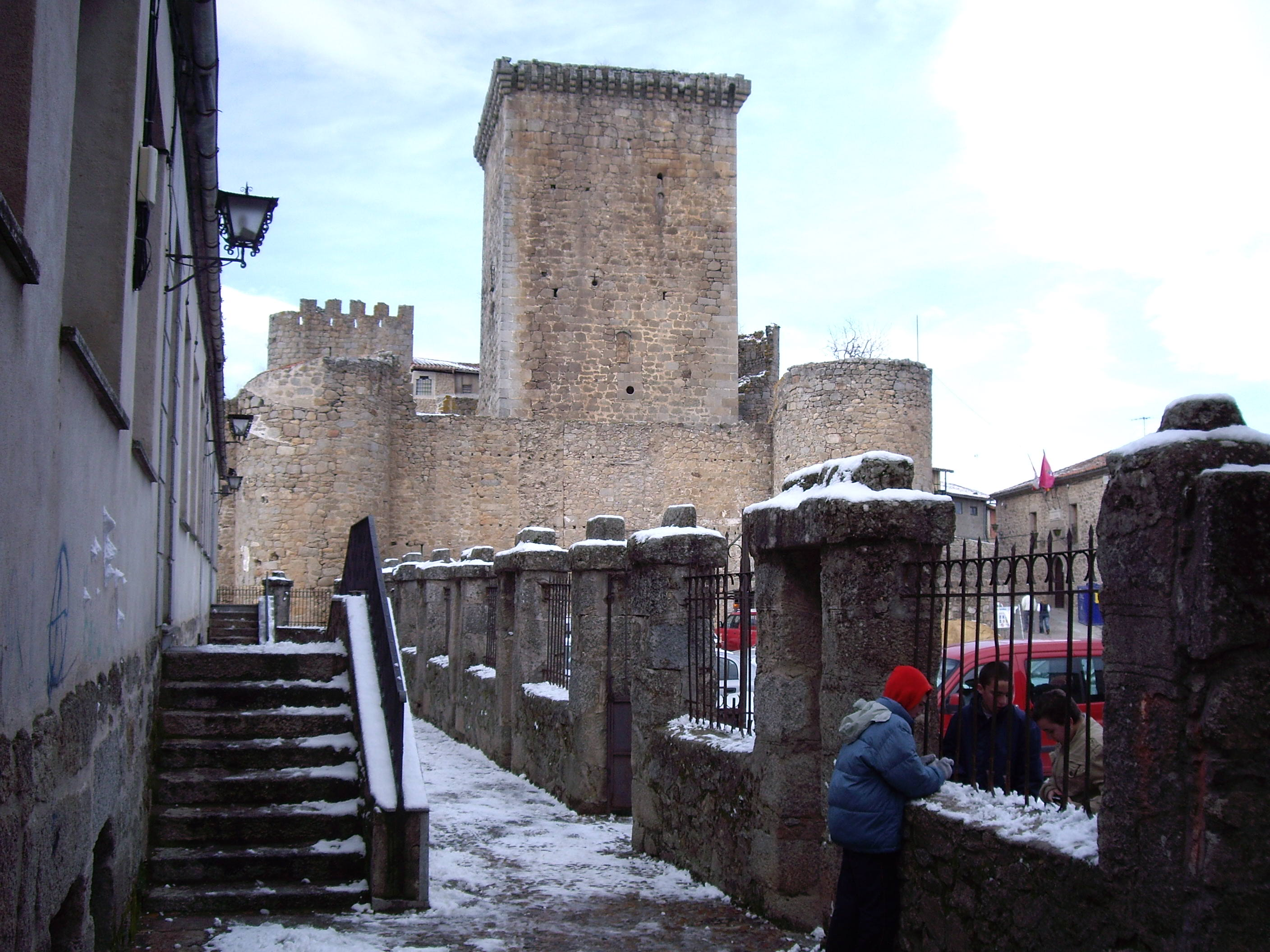
Castle of Miranda del Castañar

- The Castle of the Zuñigas or of the County of Miranda del Castañar
- The current Bullring and former castle inner ward (the oldest square-shaped bullring in Spain)
- The Calle Derecha (Right street) and adjacent streets, the best-preserved main street of the old town.
- The medieval wall encircling the old town. Miranda del Castañar is one of the handful of villages and towns keeping a complete and intact medieval wall with its gates looking to the four cardinal points.
- The Ronda Nocturna (night watch walk), an inner alley walk under the houses clinging to the wall that the town watchmen used to stand guard over Miranda del Castañar in the nighttime. The most prominent part of this walk is the vaulted lancet arch stretch next to the town church.
- The church The inside is plain because the coffered ceiling collapsed. In spite of the past looting, the church still keeps some artistic masterpieces.
- The Belfry A lavish belfry overlooking the whole town. It belongs to the town council.
- The Chapel of Nuestra Señora La Virgen de la Cuesta (Our Lady the Virgin of the Slope) A beautiful well-preserved chapel which houses the patron saint of Miranda del Castañar. It offers impressive views of Peña de Francia.
- The warehouse A public market belonging to the town hall where formerly people could store, sell and buy grain.
- The Scrivener's House The most beautiful manor house in Miranda del Castañar
- The Royal Butchery A quaint example of civil architecture; it has the showcase off the street and an abattoir at the back.
- The Priest's House
- The Royal Prison
- the Hunting Pavilion of Marquis of Selva Alegre also known as Pando House (because of the General Pando, a hero of the Philippines War), or also called El Coto Escolar (former agronomy school).
- The Inquisition House

== Demography ==
The depopulation of the town is causing concern. One of the top priorities for the town council is to keep locals in the town and to attract new people and new workers.

- Population 2011: 505 inhabitants (INE 2009: 522 inhabitants.)

== See also ==
- Province of Salamanca
- Sierra de Francia
- Castile and León
