= Garcibuey =

- Municipality
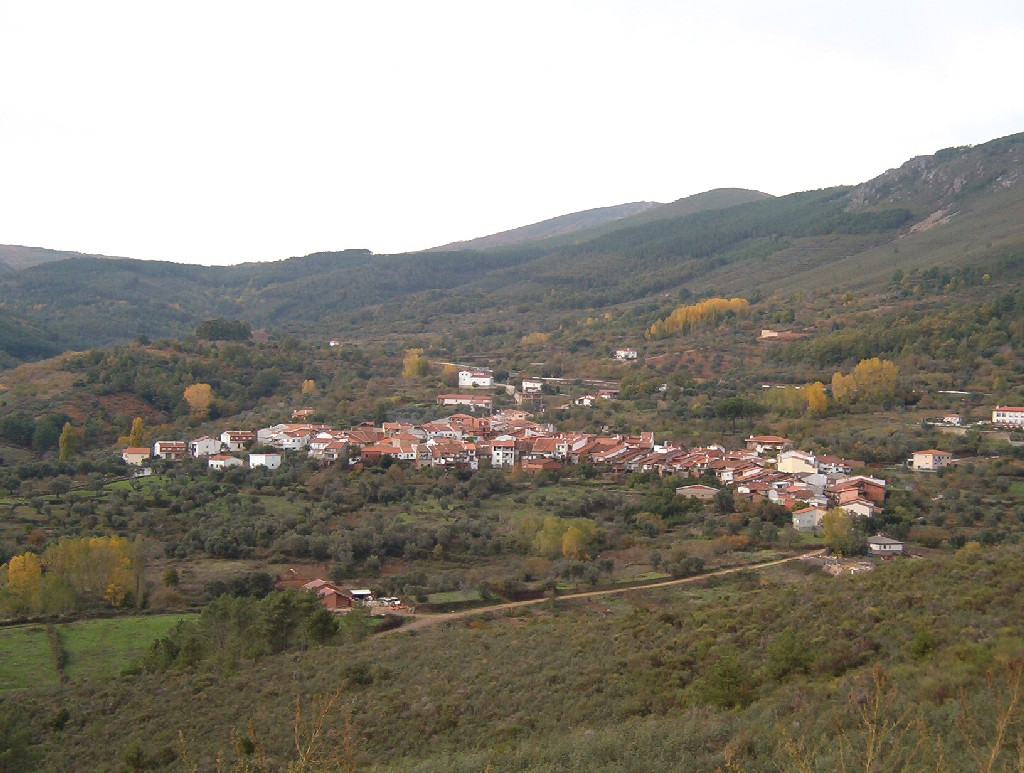

- Location in Salamanca

- Location in Spain
- Coordinates: 40°31′N 5°59′W
- Country: Spain
- Autonomous community: Castile and León
- Province: Salamanca
- Comarca: Sierra de Francia
- Judicial district: Béjar

Government
  - Mayor: José Miguel Mata Andrés (People's Party)

Area
  - Total: 12.51 km^{2} (4.83 sq mi)
- Elevation: 691 m (2,267 ft)

Population (2025-01-01)
  - Total: 186
  - Density: 14.9/km^{2} (38.5/sq mi)
- Demonym(s): garcibueño, -a
- Time zone: UTC+1 (CET)
  - Summer (DST): UTC+2 (CEST)
- Postal code: 37658
- Dialing code: 923

Garcibuey is a village and municipality in the province of Salamanca, western Spain, part of the autonomous community of Castile-Leon. It is located 82 kilometres (51 mi) from the provincial capital city of Salamanca and has a population of 232 people.

== Geography ==
The municipality covers an area of 13 km^{2} (5.0 sq mi). It lies 691 metres (2,267 ft) above sea level and the postal code is 37658. The village has a small reservoir built in 1940.

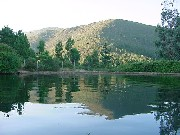
Nearby reservoir
