= San Miguel del Robledo =

- Municipality
- Location in Salamanca
- Coordinates: 40°32′13″N 6°2′44″W
- Country: Spain
- Autonomous community: Castile and León
- Province: Salamanca
- Comarca: Sierra de Francia

Government
  - Mayor: Emilia Cruz Lucas (People's Party)

Area
  - Total: 10 km^{2} (3.9 sq mi)
- Elevation: 1,030 m (3,380 ft)

Population (2025-01-01)
  - Total: 52
  - Density: 5.2/km^{2} (13/sq mi)
- Time zone: UTC+1 (CET)
  - Summer (DST): UTC+2 (CEST)
- Postal code: 37659

San Miguel del Robledo is a village and municipality in the province of Salamanca, western Spain, part of the autonomous community of Castile-Leon. It is located 69 kilometres from the provincial capital city of Salamanca and has a population of 62 people.

== Geography ==
The municipality covers an area of 10 km². It lies 1030 metres above sea level and the postal code is 37694.
