= Pinedas =

- Municipality
- Location in Salamanca
- Coordinates: 40°26′43″N 5°57′36″W
- Country: Spain
- Autonomous community: Castile and León
- Province: Salamanca
- Comarca: Sierra de Francia

Government
  - Mayor: Hilario Pascual Gil (People's Party)

Area
  - Total: 17 km^{2} (6.6 sq mi)
- Elevation: 793 m (2,602 ft)

Population (2025-01-01)
  - Total: 88
  - Density: 5.2/km^{2} (13/sq mi)
- Time zone: UTC+1 (CET)
  - Summer (DST): UTC+2 (CEST)
- Postal code: 37712

Pinedas is a municipality located in the province of Salamanca, Castile and León, Spain. As of 2016 the municipality has a population of 107 inhabitants.
