= Valero, Salamanca =

Valero
- Municipality
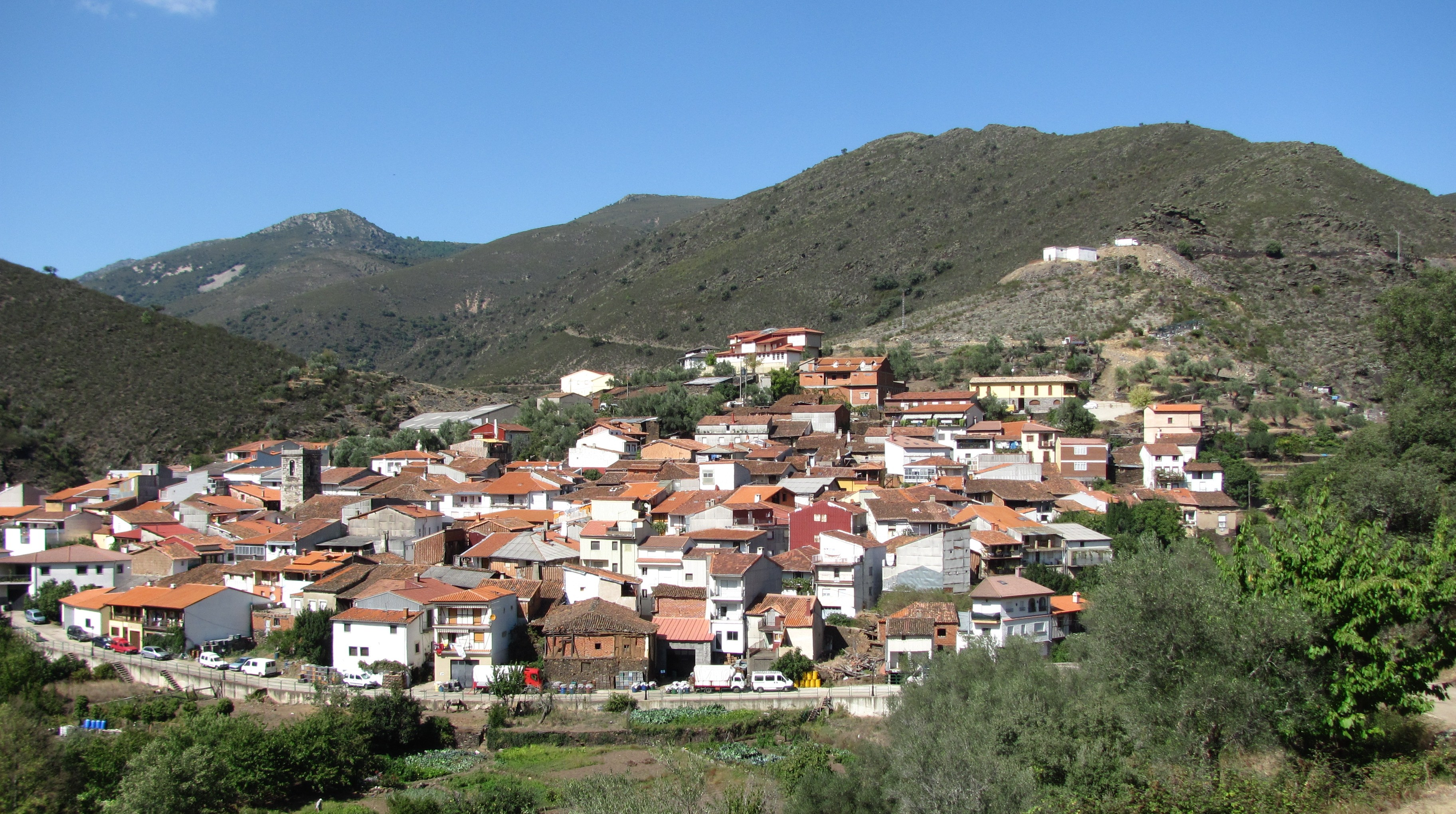

- Location in Salamanca
- Coordinates: 40°32′8″N 5°56′33″W
- Country: Spain
- Autonomous community: Castile and León
- Province: Salamanca
- Comarca: Sierra de Francia

Government
  - Mayor: Demetrio Canete Martín (People's Party)

Area
  - Total: 26 km^{2} (10 sq mi)
- Elevation: 584 m (1,916 ft)

Population (2025-01-01)
  - Total: 269
  - Density: 10/km^{2} (27/sq mi)
- Time zone: UTC+1 (CET)
  - Summer (DST): UTC+2 (CEST)
- Postal code: 37764

Valero is a municipality located in the province of Salamanca, Castile and León, Spain.
