= El Maíllo =

- Municipality
- Flag Coat of arms

- Location in Salamanca

- Location in Spain
- Coordinates: 40°34′N 6°10′W
- Country: Spain
- Autonomous community: Castile and León
- Province: Salamanca
- Comarca: Sierra de Francia

Government
  - Mayor: Nicanor Criado Hernández (People's Party)

Area
  - Total: 46 km^{2} (18 sq mi)
- Elevation: 985 m (3,232 ft)

Population (2025-01-01)
  - Total: 282
  - Density: 6.1/km^{2} (16/sq mi)
- Time zone: UTC+1 (CET)
  - Summer (DST): UTC+2 (CEST)
- Postal code: 37261

El Maíllo (Spanish pronunciation: [el ma.ˈi.ʎo]) is a village and municipality in the province of Salamanca, in the Autonomous Community of Castilla y Leon, Spain. It is situated some 72 km (45 mi) from Salamanca, the provincial capital. As of 2016 the municipality has a population of 287 inhabitants. The municipality has an area of 46 km^{2} (18 sq mi). It sits at 985 m (3,232 ft) above sea level. Its postal code is 37261.
