= Mogarraz =

- Municipality
- Coat of arms

- Location in Salamanca
- Coordinates: 40°29′27″N 5°59′55″W
- Country: Spain
- Autonomous community: Castile and León
- Province: Salamanca
- Comarca: Sierra de Francia

Government
  - Mayor: María Concepcion Hernández Vicente (PSOE)

Area
  - Total: 9 km^{2} (3.5 sq mi)
- Elevation: 766 m (2,513 ft)

Population (2025-01-01)
  - Total: 236
  - Density: 26/km^{2} (68/sq mi)
- Time zone: UTC+1 (CET)
  - Summer (DST): UTC+2 (CEST)
- Postal code: 37610

Mogarraz is a municipality located in the province of Salamanca, Castile and León, Spain. As of 2016 the municipality has a population of 309 inhabitants.

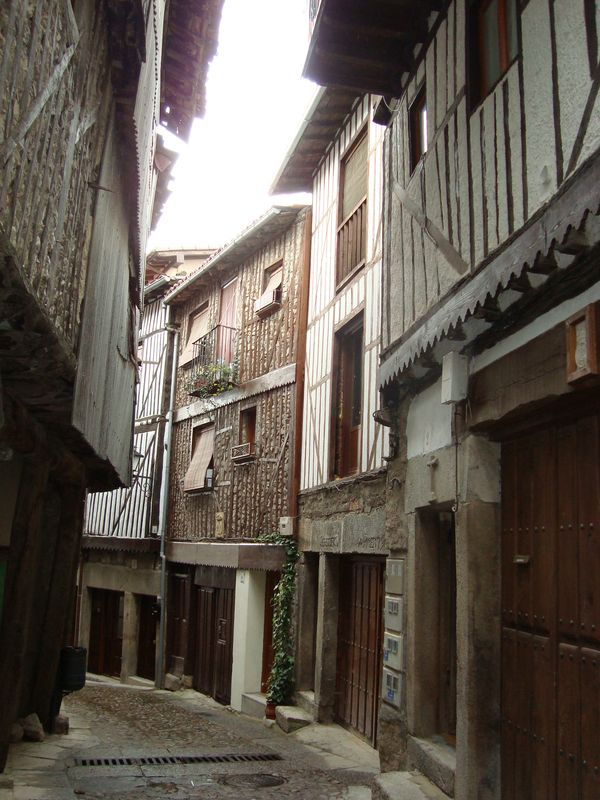
Street view of Mogarraz
