= Madroñal =

- Municipality
- Location in Salamanca
- Coordinates: 40°27′52″N 6°3′43″W
- Country: Spain
- Autonomous community: Castile and León
- Province: Salamanca
- Comarca: Sierra de Francia

Government
  - Mayor: María Esperanza Gascón de Paz (People's Party)

Area
  - Total: 2 km^{2} (0.77 sq mi)
- Elevation: 630 m (2,070 ft)

Population (2025-01-01)
  - Total: 128
  - Density: 64/km^{2} (170/sq mi)
- Time zone: UTC+1 (CET)
  - Summer (DST): UTC+2 (CEST)
- Postal code: 37619

Madroñal is a municipality located in the province of Salamanca, Castile and León, Spain. As of 2016 the municipality has a population of inhabitants.
