= Sequeros =

- Municipality
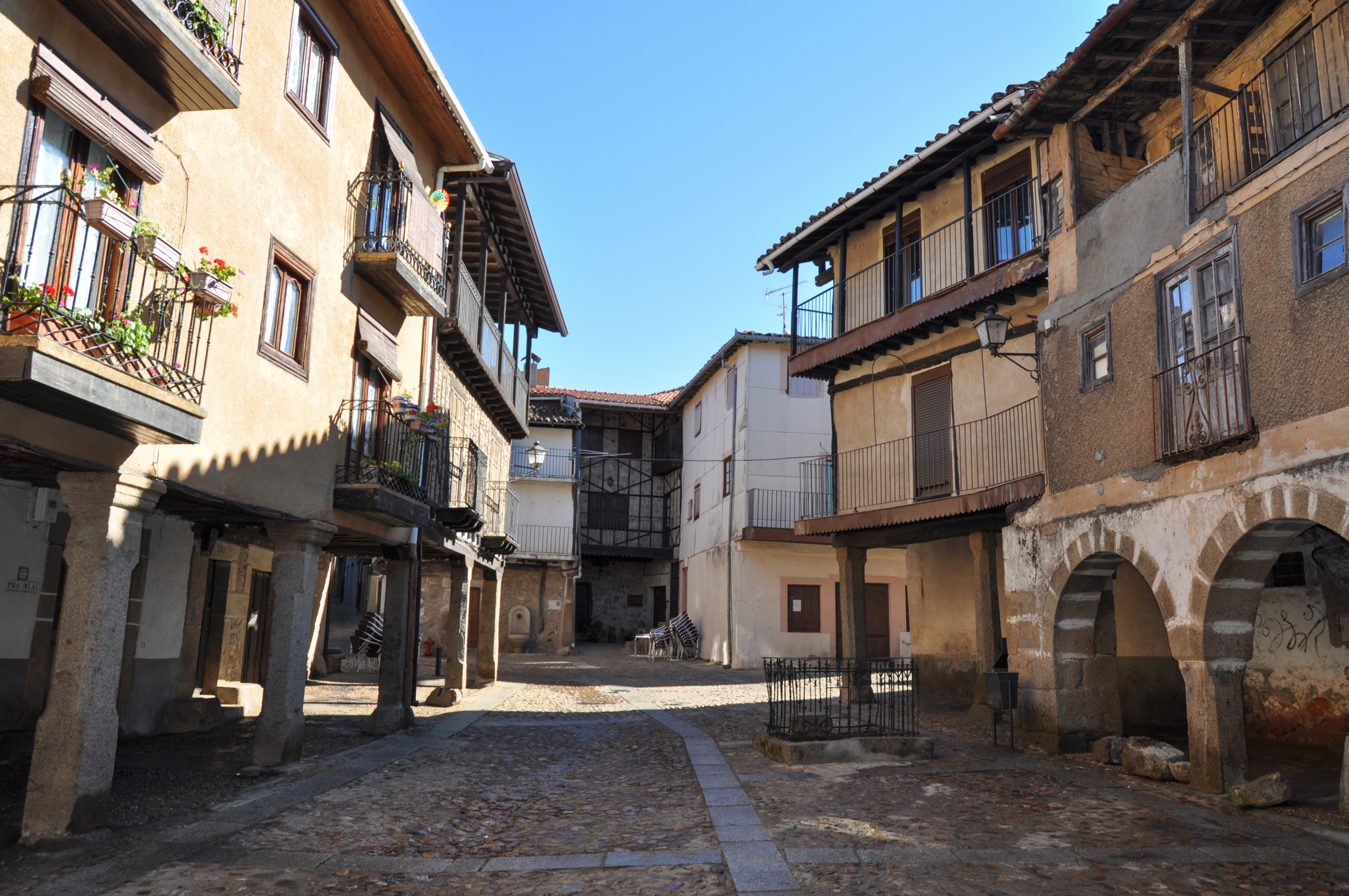

- Location in Salamanca
- Coordinates: 40°30′59″N 6°1′28″W
- Country: Spain
- Autonomous community: Castile and León
- Province: Salamanca
- Comarca: Sierra de Francia

Government
  - Mayor: Mauricio Angulo Guerrero (People's Party)

Area
  - Total: 6 km^{2} (2.3 sq mi)
- Elevation: 930 m (3,050 ft)

Population (2025-01-01)
  - Total: 216
  - Density: 36/km^{2} (93/sq mi)
- Time zone: UTC+1 (CET)
  - Summer (DST): UTC+2 (CEST)
- Postal code: 37650

Sequeros is a municipality located in the province of Salamanca, Castile and León, Spain. As of 2016 the municipality has a population of 237 inhabitants.
