= San Martín del Castañar =

- Municipality
- Location in Salamanca
- Coordinates: 40°31′23″N 6°3′53″W
- Country: Spain
- Autonomous community: Castile and León
- Province: Salamanca
- Comarca: Sierra de Francia

Government
  - Mayor: Alfonso Buenaventura Calvo González (PSOE)

Area
  - Total: 16 km^{2} (6.2 sq mi)
- Elevation: 834 m (2,736 ft)

Population (2025-01-01)
  - Total: 233
  - Density: 15/km^{2} (38/sq mi)
- Time zone: UTC+1 (CET)
  - Summer (DST): UTC+2 (CEST)
- Postal code: 37659

San Martín del Castañar is a municipality located in the province of Salamanca, Castile and León, Spain. As of 2016 the municipality has a population of 226 inhabitants.

== Tourism ==
San Martin has a major tourist activity in relation to the size of the municipality, especially at Easter and summer holidays. Saint festivities are held in August, they started the 9th and they usually last about 5 days.

Its main attractions are its castle, with a cemetery in the inner part, and the bullring (according to some sources, the second oldest in Spain).

Other remarkable places are the river and its surroundings; the church; the square; fountains or "pylons"; half-timbered houses; driveways; roads and the bakery, the only one in the village, in which "perronillas", assortment of pastries, muffins and “hornazos” are made by hand.

== Monuments ==
- A castle, where the cemetery and an interpretation center are found.
- Houses, which are built with the traditional architecture of “Sierra de Francia”. Typical balconies are very common.
- Church and bell tower
- Plaza Mayor
- Roman bridge
- ”Humilladero” Chapel
- Visigothic ruins (“Legoriza” camping)
- Monastery
