= Villanueva del Conde =

- Municipality
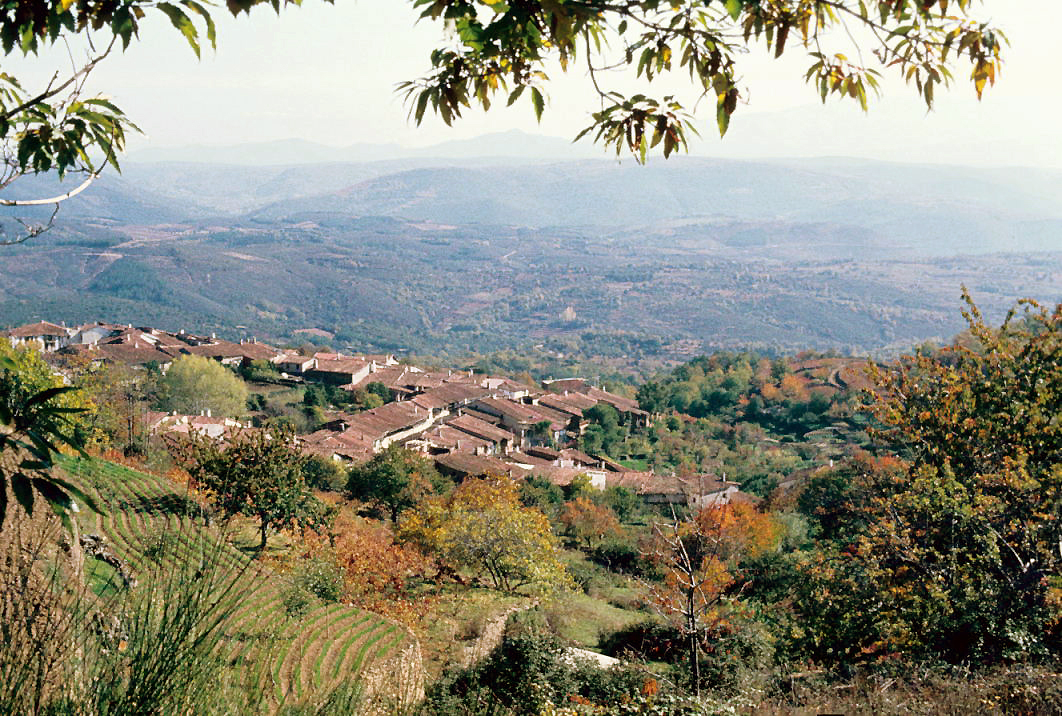

- Location in Salamanca
- Coordinates: 40°30′37″N 6°0′37″W
- Country: Spain
- Autonomous community: Castile and León
- Province: Salamanca
- Comarca: Sierra de Francia

Government
  - Mayor: Francisco Javier García Hidalgo (People's Party)

Area
  - Total: 13 km^{2} (5.0 sq mi)
- Elevation: 801 m (2,628 ft)

Population (2025-01-01)
  - Total: 172
  - Density: 13/km^{2} (34/sq mi)
- Time zone: UTC+1 (CET)
  - Summer (DST): UTC+2 (CEST)
- Postal code: 37658

Villanueva del Conde is a village and municipality in the province of Salamanca, western Spain, part of the autonomous community of Castile-Leon. It is located 78 kilometres from the provincial capital city of Salamanca and has a population of 251 people.

== Geography ==
The municipality covers an area of 13 km^{2}. It lies 801 metres above sea level and the postal code is 37658.

== See also ==
List of municipalities in Salamanca
