= Monforte de la Sierra =

- Municipality
- Coat of arms

- Location in Salamanca
- Coordinates: 40°28′55″N 6°3′43″W
- Country: Spain
- Autonomous community: Castile and León
- Province: Salamanca
- Comarca: Sierra de Francia

Government
  - Mayor: Ángel Pescador Acosta (PSOE)

Area
  - Total: 4 km^{2} (1.5 sq mi)
- Elevation: 839 m (2,753 ft)

Population (2025-01-01)
  - Total: 50
  - Density: 13/km^{2} (32/sq mi)
- Time zone: UTC+1 (CET)
  - Summer (DST): UTC+2 (CEST)
- Postal code: 37618

Monforte de la Sierra is a village and small municipality in the province of Salamanca, western Spain, part of the autonomous community of Castile-Leon. It is located 90 kilometres (56 mi) from the provincial capital city of Salamanca and has a population of 81 people.

== Geography ==
The municipality covers an area of 4 km^{2} (1.5 sq mi). It lies 839 metres (2,753 ft) above sea level and the postal code is 37618.
