= Nava de Francia =

- Municipality
- Coat of arms

- Location in Salamanca
- Coordinates: 40°32′8″N 6°7′1″W
- Country: Spain
- Autonomous community: Castile and León
- Province: Salamanca
- Comarca: Sierra de Francia

Government
  - Mayor: Julian González García (PSOE)

Area
  - Total: 17 km^{2} (6.6 sq mi)
- Elevation: 1,041 m (3,415 ft)

Population (2025-01-01)
  - Total: 116
  - Density: 6.8/km^{2} (18/sq mi)
- Time zone: UTC+1 (CET)
  - Summer (DST): UTC+2 (CEST)
- Postal code: 37659

Nava de Francia is a municipality in the province of Salamanca, autonomous community of Castile and León, Spain. It is 75 km (47 mi) away from Salamanca, the capital of the province.

As of 2016 the municipality has a population of 142 inhabitants. Its area is 16,51 km². It lies at an altitude 1,041 metres (3,415 ft) above the sea level and the postal code is 37623.
