= Alagón (river) =

River in Spain

Coordinates: 40°40′51″N 5°47′09″W

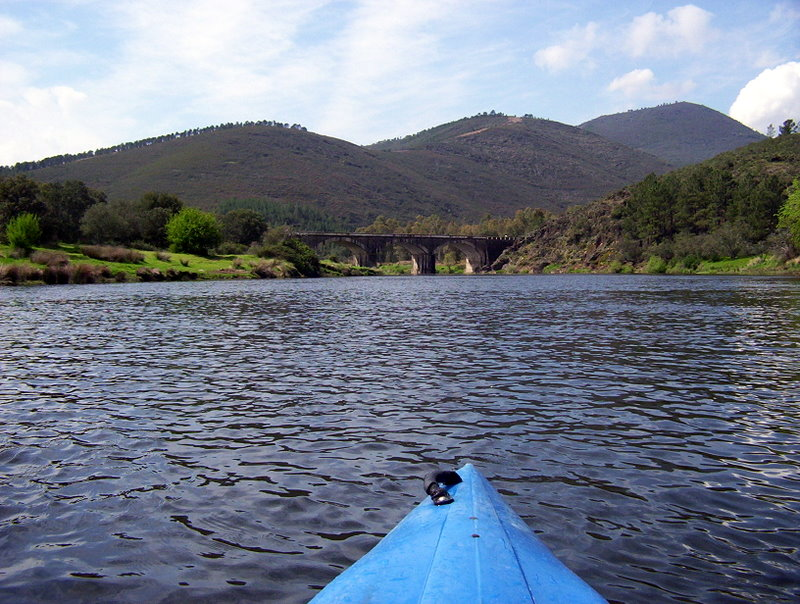
The Alagón a few kilometres downriver from Sotoserrano.

The Alagón is a 205 km long river in Spain, right tributary to the Tagus, as well as this river's longest tributary. Its source is at 1,060 m in the Sierra de Francia, near the village Frades de la Sierra, south of Salamanca. The Alagón flows southwest, through the towns San Esteban de la Sierra, Guijo de Granadilla, and Coria. It finally joins the Tagus at Alcántara.

There are three dams across its course: the "Gabriel y Galán", the largest one, generating 110 MW of electricity; the "El Pontón", at Guijo de Granadilla, generating 52 MW of electricity; and the "Montehermoso-Valdeobispo" dam.

== Tributaries ==
Francia River, Sangusín River, Cuerpo de Hombre River, La Palla River, Río de los Ángeles, Ambroz River, Jerte River, and Árrago River.

== See also ==
- List of rivers of Spain
