= Cepeda, Salamanca =

Cepeda
- Municipality
- Coat of arms

- Location in Salamanca

- Location in Spain
- Coordinates: 40°28′00″N 6°02′00″W
- Country: Spain
- Autonomous community: Castile and León
- Province: Salamanca
- Comarca: Sierra de Francia

Area
  - Total: 11 km^{2} (4.2 sq mi)
- Elevation: 633 m (2,077 ft)

Population (2025-01-01)
  - Total: 287
  - Density: 26/km^{2} (68/sq mi)
- Time zone: UTC+1 (CET)
  - Summer (DST): UTC+2 (CEST)
- Postal code: 37656

Cepeda de la Sierra is a municipality in the province of Salamanca, in the autonomous communities Castile and León, Spain. It is situated 96 km (60 mi) from the city of Salamanca, the provincial capital.

As of 2016, it has a population of 349 and an area of 11 km^{2} (4.2 sq mi). It sits at an elevation of 633 metres (2,077 ft) above sea level. Its postal code is 37656.
