= Peña de Francia =

Mountain in Castile and León, Spain

Coordinates: 40.5128°N 6.1689°W

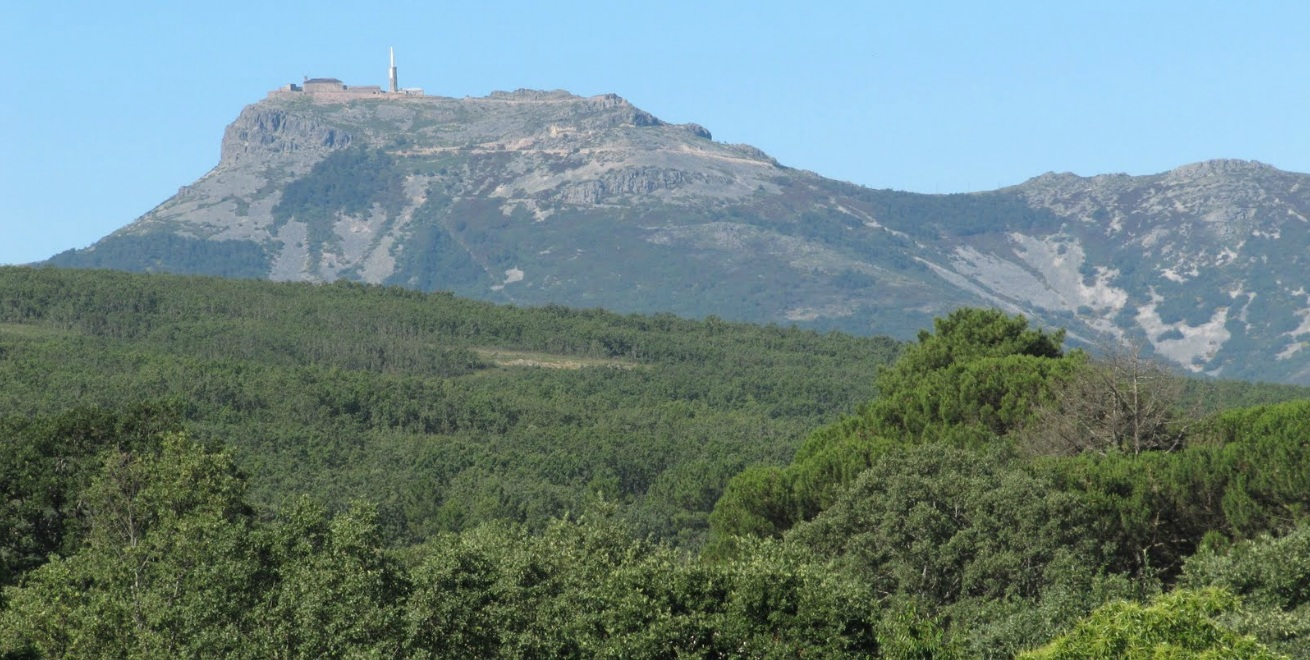
- Peña de Francia from Cereceda de la Sierra

Highest point
- Elevation: 1,727 m (5,666 ft) (Paso de los Lobos 1,499 m or 4,918 ft)
- Prominence: 198 m (650 ft)

Geography
- Location within Spain
- Location: Salamanca
- Parent range: Sierra de Francia

The Peña de Francia is a mountain that rises to 1,727 m (5,666 ft), south of the Salamanca, Autonomous Region of Castile and León, Spain, whose peak belongs to the municipality of El Cabaco.

== Location ==
It belongs to the municipality of El Cabaco, it is one of the highest mountains of the Sierra de Francia, which in turn is part of the Central System. The synclinorium of the Peña de Francia is separated from syncline of Tamames by the granite outcrop of La Alberca. Surrounding the mountain to the north are towns that have become hotbeds of rural attractions during the last decade such as La Alberca.

== Geology ==
Geologically it is a very complex structure and is one of the highest mountains of the western sector, namely the Sierra de Francia. It has a deformed structure with folds of various types, either highlighted by banks of Ordovician quartzites and conglomerates. These structures are located in an area near the Falla de Plasencia. The mountain is affected by dislocations to the North-East, along which there have been movements of blocks, and separating of different sectors of the folds.

== Religion ==
Known for its Black Madonna, Our Lady of Peñafrancia, and its great Sanctuary of Our Lady of the Peña de Francia. It has a great influx of visitors during the summer months including many Christian pilgrims, but it is virtually inaccessible in the winter due to large amounts of snow. In addition the sanctuary, has a friary, a separate guest quarters for the monastery and a telecommunication antenna.

== Views ==
From the top, the whole plain of Campo Charro is visible to the north, the Sierra de Tamames to the east, and the swamp of Gabriel and Galán to the south.

== Flora ==
The vegetation at the bottom of the Mountain consists of Quercus pyrenaica , pine and Scots pine, ferns, and other species like Erica arborea and Erica australis , almost all of this reforestation is due to fires. In the upper layer is a remarkable presence of scrub such as Cytisus oromediterraneus Echinospartum and Pterospartum tridentatum .

== See also ==
- Central System
- Sierra de Francia
- El Cabaco
- Sanctuary of Our Lady of the Peña de Francia
- Our Lady of Peñafrancia
