= Sotoserrano =

- Municipality
- Sotoserrano
- Location in Salamanca
- Interactive map of Sotoserrano
- Coordinates: 40°26′7″N 6°1′57″W
- Country: Spain
- Autonomous community: Castile and León
- Province: Salamanca
- Comarca: Sierra de Francia

Government
  - Mayor: El Tute (VOX)

Area
  - Total: 58 km^{2} (22 sq mi)
- Elevation: 508 m (1,667 ft)

Population (2025-01-01)
  - Total: 498
  - Density: 8.6/km^{2} (22/sq mi)
- Time zone: UTC+1 (CET)
  - Summer (DST): UTC+2 (CEST)
- Postal code: 37657

Sotoserrano is a municipality located in the province of Salamanca, Castile and León, Spain. As of 2016 the municipality has a population of 596 inhabitants.

== Gallery ==
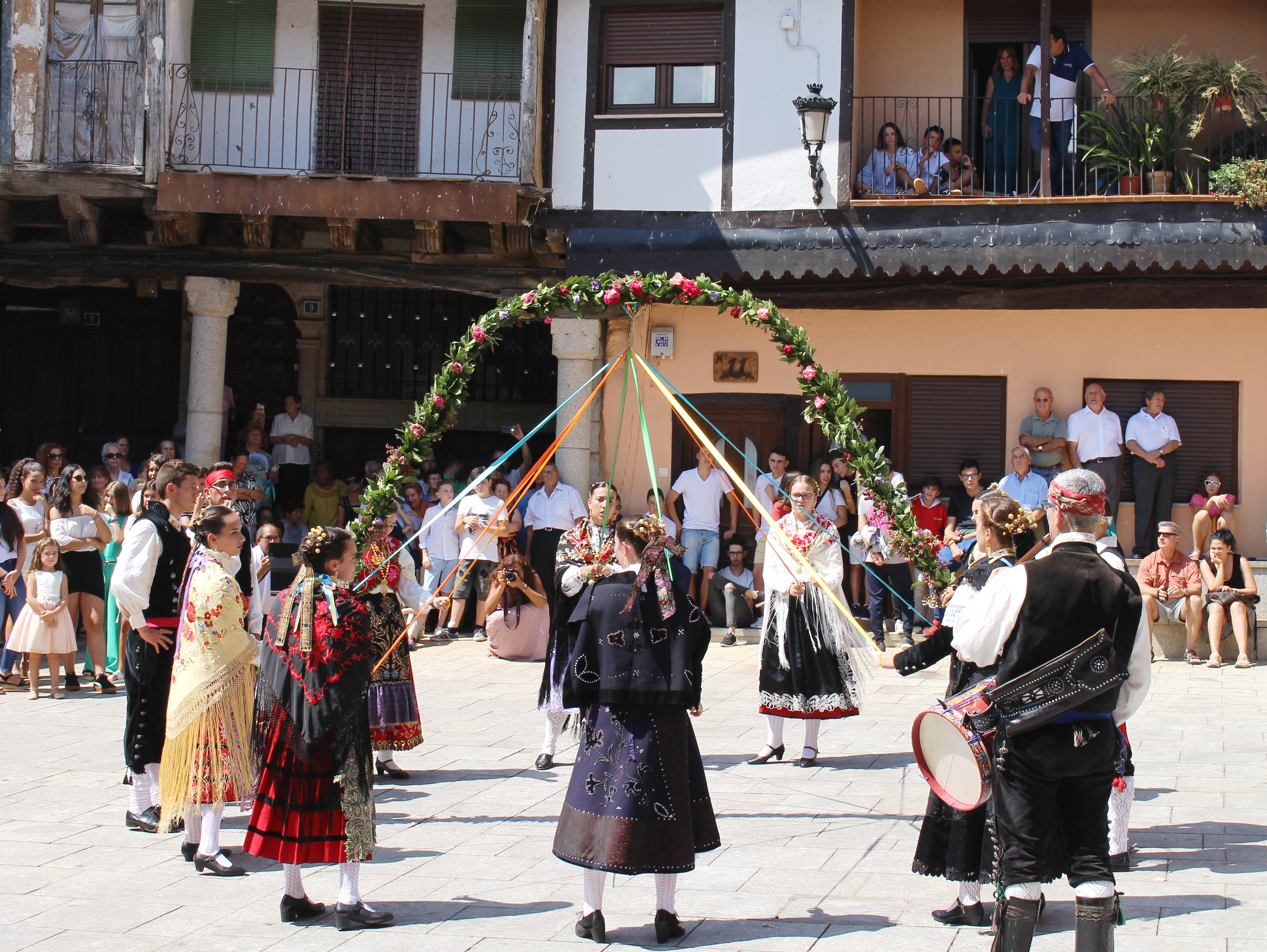

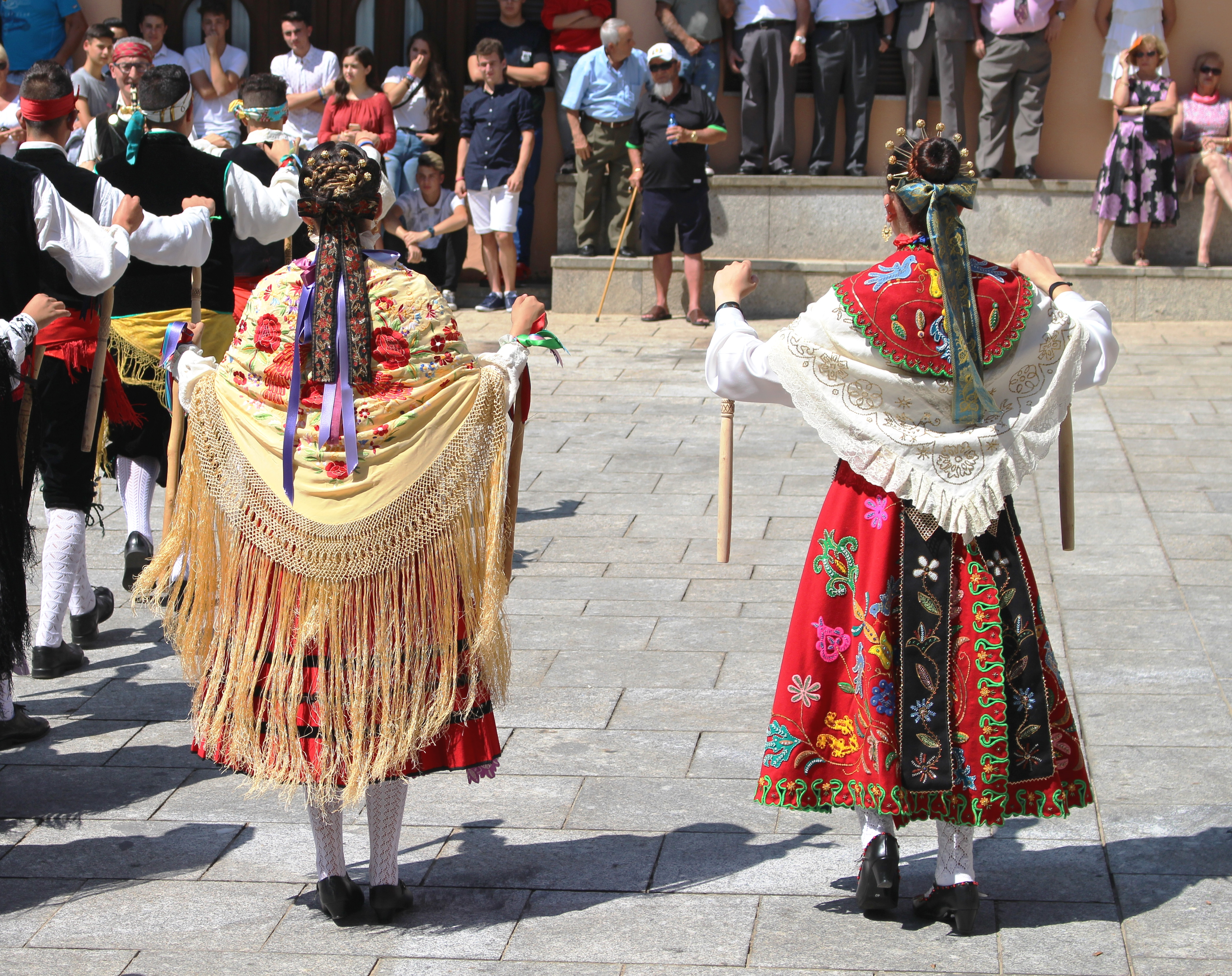

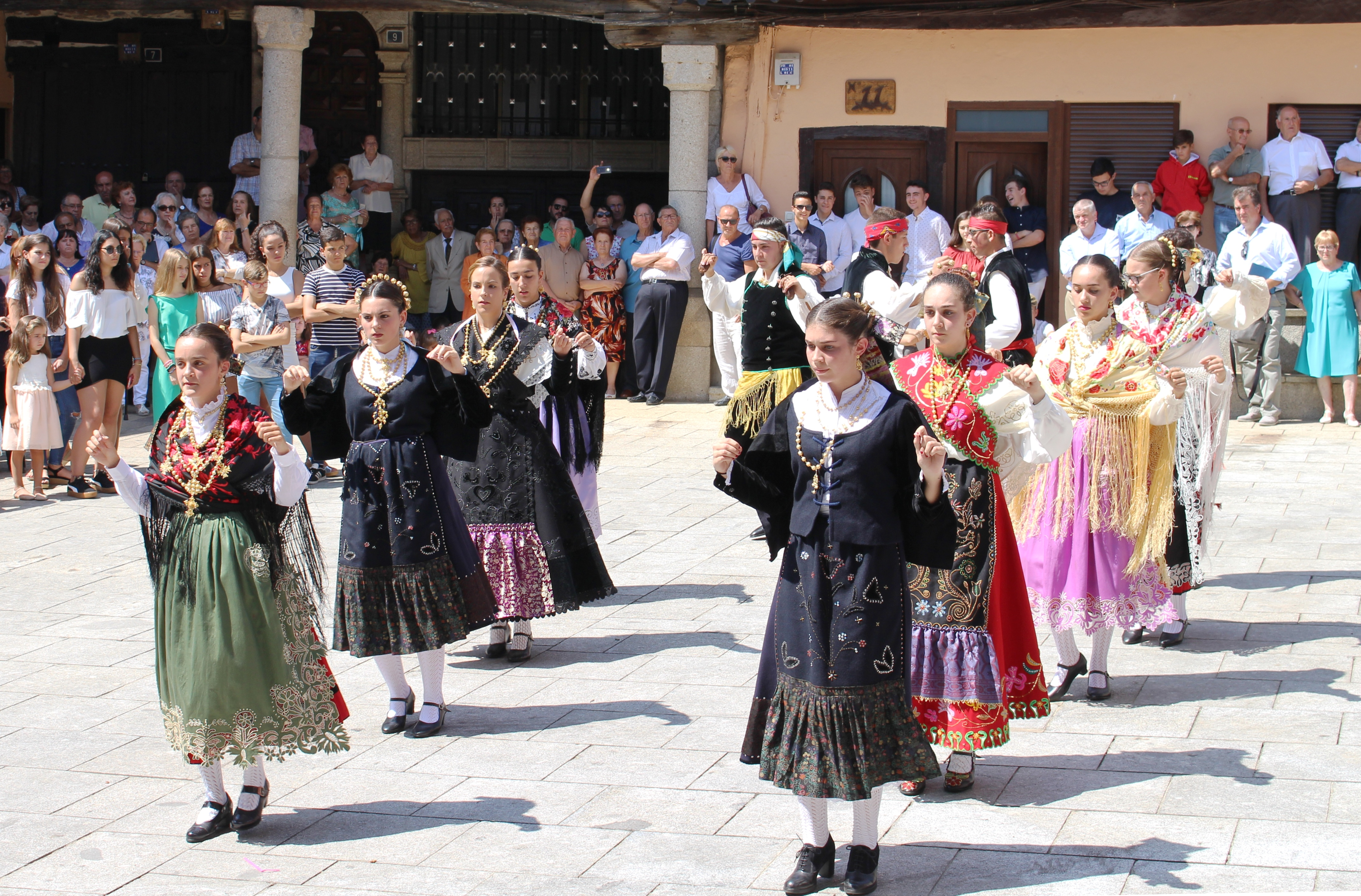
