= El Cabaco =

- Municipality
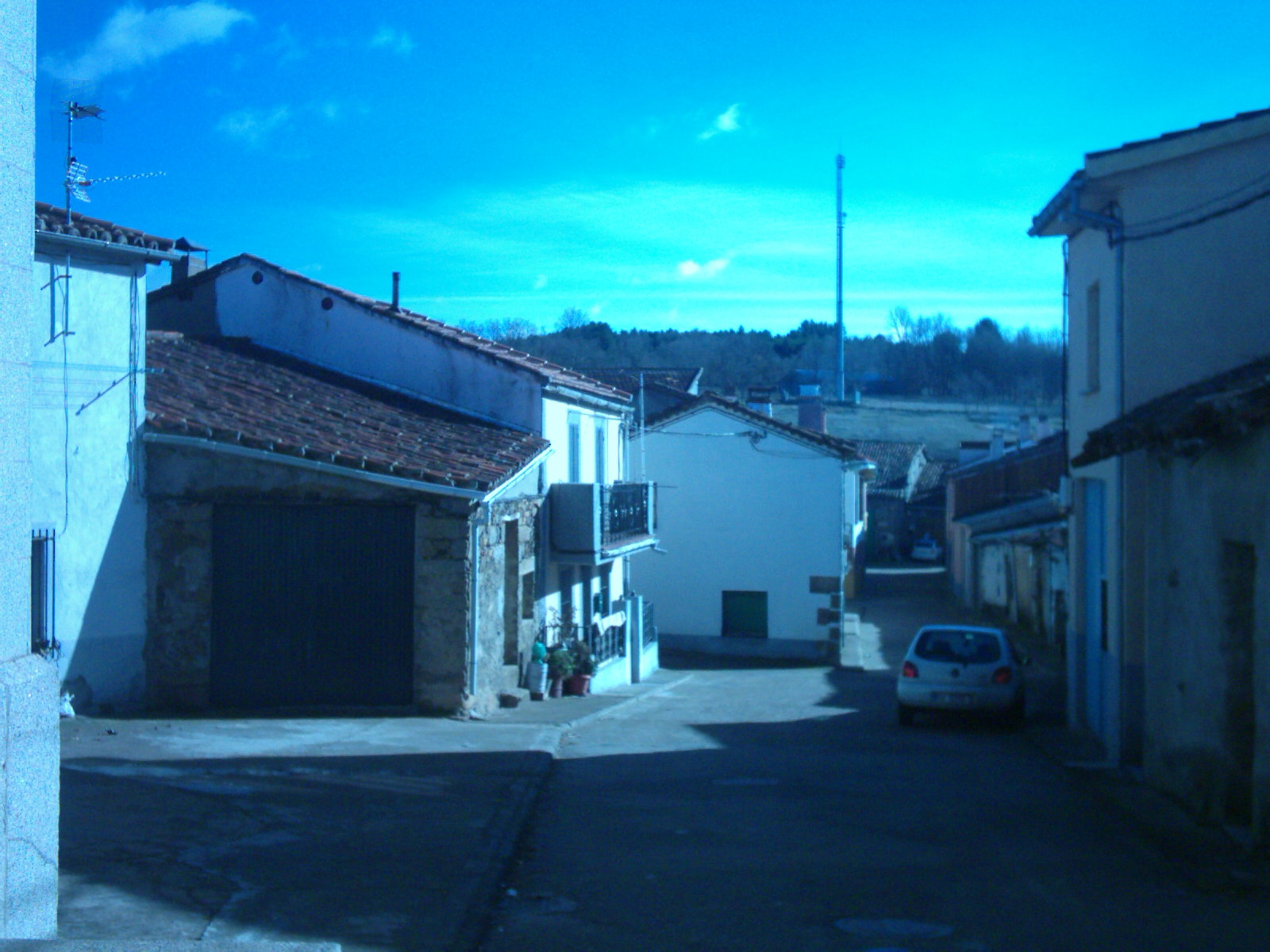
- Calle Larga, street in El Cabaco

- Flag Coat of arms

- Location in Salamanca

- Location in Spain
- Coordinates: 40°34′N 6°08′W
- Country: Spain
- Autonomous community: Castile and León
- Province: Salamanca
- Comarca: Sierra de Francia

Government
  - Mayor: Jose Antonio Sanchez Iglesias (PP)

Area
  - Total: 47 km^{2} (18 sq mi)
- Elevation: 958 m (3,143 ft)

Population (2025-01-01)
  - Total: 227
  - Density: 4.8/km^{2} (13/sq mi)
- Time zone: UTC+1 (CET)
  - Summer (DST): UTC+2 (CEST)
- Postal code: 37621

El Cabaco is a village and municipality in the province of Salamanca, western Spain, part of the autonomous community of Castile-Leon. It is located 65 kilometres (40 mi) from the provincial capital city of Salamanca and has a population of 248 people.

== Geography ==
The municipality covers an area of 47 km^{2} (18 sq mi). It lies 958 metres (3,143 ft) above sea level and the postal code is 37620.
