= Sierra de Francia =

Mountain range in Spain

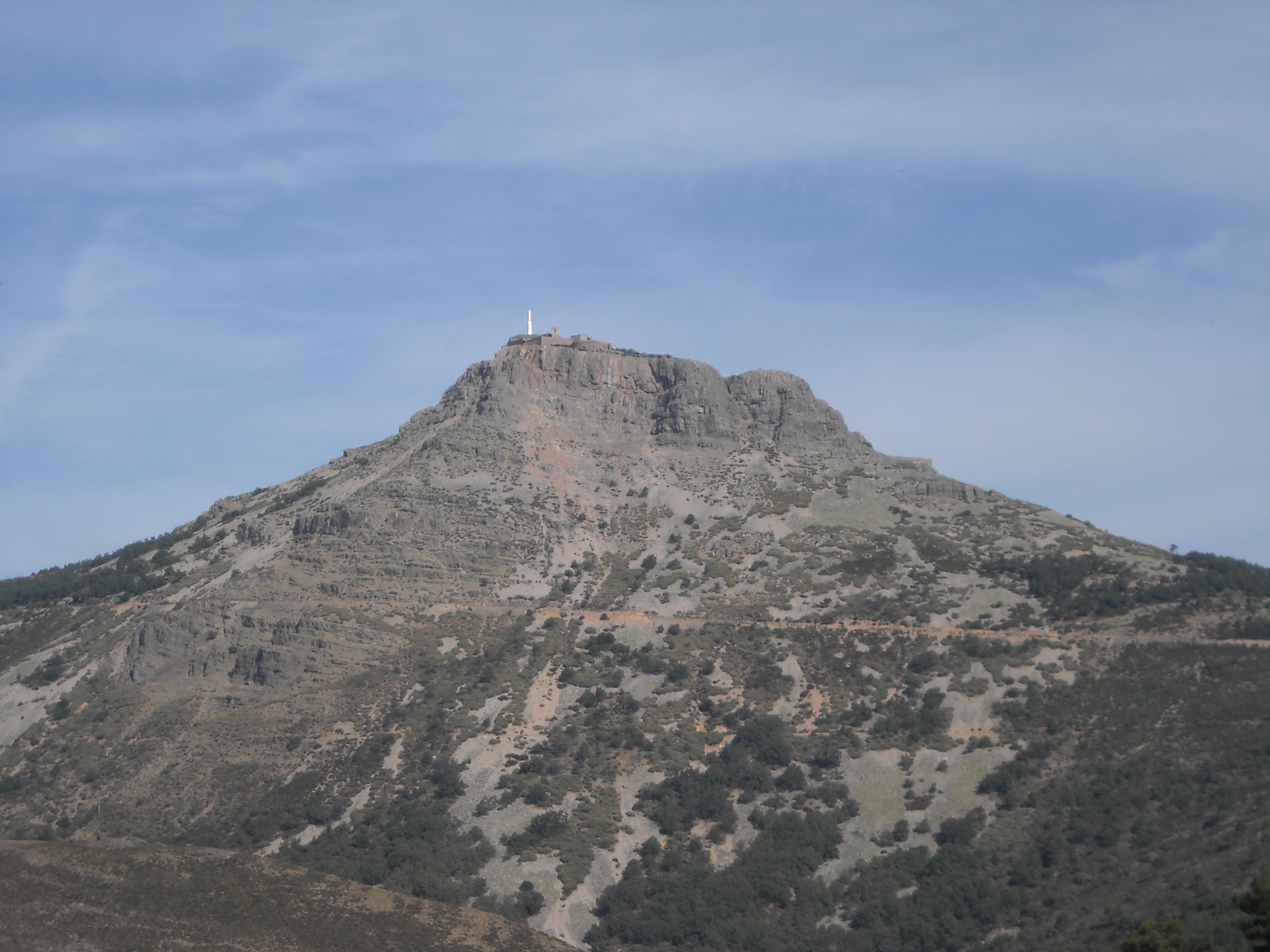
- Peña de Francia seen from La Alberca

Highest point
- Elevation: 1,735 m (5,692 ft)
- Coordinates: 40°33′N 6°06′W

Geography
- Location: Castile and León, Spain
- Parent range: Sistema Central

Geology
- Rock type: Granite

The Sierra de Francia is a mountain range located in Sierra de Francia Comarca at the southern end of Salamanca Province, Castile and León, Spain. It is located about 70 km from Salamanca city. The region is sparsely inhabited and its few towns have great cultural value.

Most of the Sierra de Francia's territory, together with the valley of Las Batuecas was declared Las Batuecas-Sierra de Francia Natural Park in 1978. Together with neighboring Sierra de Béjar it constitutes a Biosphere Reserve. Some of the towns of the comarca have been officially declared Conjunto Histórico-Artístico owing to their cultural and architectural value.

== Geography ==
The Sierra de Francia is one of the mountain ranges belonging to the Sistema Central. Its forested mountain slopes (alder, oak, pine and ash) rise over the Northern Castilian Plateau, marking the geographical limit of its southwestern plains (Llanura Salmantina). From its southern side this mountain chain marks the northern limit of Las Hurdes, the Extremaduran comarca.

The Sierra de Francia consists of a quite regular succession of peaks of moderate height, of which the Pico de La Hastiala (1.735 m) is the highest. At the top of the Peña de Francia (1723 m) stands one of the highest Virgin Mary shrines of the world, as well as a RTVE antenna. Other summits worth mentioning are the Mesa del Francés (1.638 m) and the Pico Robledo (1.614 m). All these peaks are usually covered with snow in the winter season.

Among the rivers that cut valleys in the sierra, the most famous is the Río Francia, which gives the mountain chain its name, as well as the Alagón.
