= Comarca de Vitigudino =

- Comarca
- Location in Salamanca
- Coordinates: 40°59′42″N 6°26′02″W
- Country: Spain
- Autonomous community: Castile and León
- Province: Salamanca

Area
  - Total: 2,362.3 km^{2} (912.1 sq mi)

Population (2010)
  - Total: 19,070
  - Density: 8.073/km^{2} (20.91/sq mi)
- Time zone: UTC+1 (CET)
  - Summer (DST): UTC+2 (CEST)

Comarca de Vitigudino is a comarca in the province of Salamanca, Castile and León. It contains the following subcomarcas:

- El Abadengo, which contains the municipalities of Ahigal de los Aceiteros, Bañobárez, Bermellar, Bogajo, Cerralbo, Fuenteliante, La Fregeneda, Hinojosa de Duero, Lumbrales, Olmedo de Camaces, La Redonda, San Felices de los Gallegos, Sobradillo and Villavieja de Yeltes.
- Las Arribes, which contains the municipalities of Aldeadávila, Masueco, Mieza, Pereña, Saucelle, Villarino and Vilvestre.
- La Ramajería, which contains the municipalities of Ahigal de Villarino, Almendra, Barceo, Barruecopardo, Brincones, Cabeza del Caballo, Cerezal de Peñahorcada, El Manzano, El Milano, Encinasola de los Comendadores, Guadramiro, Iruelos, La Peña, La Vídola, La Zarza de Pumareda, Puertas, Saldeana, Sanchón de la Ribera, Trabanca, Valderrodrigo, Valsalabroso, Villar de Samaniego and Villasbuenas.
- Tierra de Vitigudino, which contains the municipalities of Cipérez, El Cubo, Espadaña, Moronta, Peralejos de Abajo, Peralejos de Arriba, Pozos de Hinojo, Villar de Peralonso, Villares de Yeltes, Villarmuerto, Vitigudino and Yecla.
