= Villares =

Villares refers to:

== People ==
- Aline Villares Reis (b. 1989), Brazilian footballer
- Diosdado Simón Villares (1954-2002), Spanish biologist
- Luis Villares (b. 1978), Spanish jurist

== Places ==
- Los Villares, city located in the province of Jaén, Spain
- Los Villares (ancient city), near Caudete de las Fuentes, Requena-Utiel, Valencian Community, Spain
- Villares de Jadraque municipality located in the province of Guadalajara, Castile-La Mancha, Spain
- Villares de Órbigo, municipality located in the province of León, Castile and León, Spain
- Villares del Saz municipality located in the province of Cuenca, Castile-La Mancha, Spain
- Los Villares de Soria municipality located in the province of Soria, Castile and León, Spain
- Villares de la Reina municipality in the province of Salamanca, Spain
- Villares de Yeltes municipality located in the province of Salamanca, Castile and León, Spain
