= Ahigal (disambiguation) =

Ahigal can refer to:

- Ahigal, a municipality in Cáceres province, Extremadura, Spain
- Ahigal de Villarino, a municipality in Salamanca province, Castilla y León, Spain
- Ahigal de los Aceiteros, a municipality Salamanca province, Castilla y León, Spain
