= Villavieja =

Villavieja may refer to:

- Villa Vieja, Santiago del Estero, Argentina
- Villavieja, Huila, Colombia
- Villavieja del Lozoya, Madrid, Spain
- Villavieja de Yeltes, Salamanca, Castile and León, Spain
