= Puertas =

- Municipality
- Location in Salamanca

- Location in Spain
- Coordinates: 41°5′49″N 6°17′17″W
- Country: Spain
- Autonomous community: Castile and León
- Province: Salamanca
- Comarca: Vitigudino
- Subcomarca: La Ramajería

Government
  - Mayor: Vidal Rodríguez Sánchez (People's Party)

Area
  - Total: 62.71 km^{2} (24.21 sq mi)
- Elevation: 786 m (2,579 ft)

Population (2025-01-01)
  - Total: 66
  - Density: 1.1/km^{2} (2.7/sq mi)
- Time zone: UTC+1 (CET)
  - Summer (DST): UTC+2 (CEST)
- Postal code: 37159

Puertas is a municipality located in the province of Salamanca, Castile and León, Spain. It is integrated into the Vitigudino region and the La Ramajería sub-region. It is occupying a total area of 62.71 km² and according to the municipal register prepared by the INE in 2017, it has a population of 79 inhabitants.

== Economy ==
The economy of Puertas depends exclusively on livestock farms, mainly of the Morucha and Charolesa breed.
