= Wolfram Crisis =

Diplomatic crisis between Spain and the Allied powers of World War II

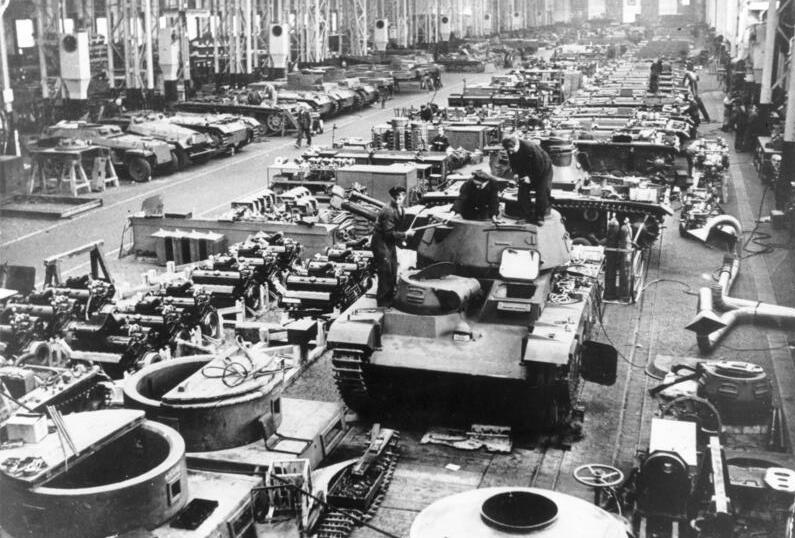
Assembly line of German Neubaufahrzeug tanks in 1940. The extreme hardness and density of tungsten made it a strategic chemical element for producing stronger steels used in armored vehicles.

The Wolfram Crisis (Spanish: Crisis del wolframio) was a diplomatic conflict during World War II between Francoist Spain and the Allied powers, which sought to block Spanish exports of tungsten ore to Nazi Germany. "Wolfram" is an alternate name for tungsten, a strategic material used in anti-tank weapons and machine tools. Most of the wolframite mines in Europe, such as the Barruecopardo mine, are in northwestern Spain and northern Portugal. (Note: In Britain, the Drakelands Mine in Devon and the Castle an Dinas mine in Cornwall were worked during the war.) The Barruecopardo mine, located in Salamanca, was a key source of tungsten during the war.

== Background ==
While the Allies pressured General Franco to publicly announce the withdrawal of the Blue Division after abandoning "non-belligerence," the Laurel incident severely strained relations between the Franco regime and the Allies, particularly the United States. On October 18, 1943, Foreign Minister Francisco Gómez-Jordana sent a congratulatory telegram to José P. Laurel, who had been appointed by the Japanese—occupying the archipelago since June 1942 after defeating the Americans—as president of a puppet government in the Philippines. Franco’s message, along with a similar one from Hitler, was celebrated by Japanese propaganda and widely broadcast by Radio Tokyo. The Allies immediately protested what they considered Franco’s de facto recognition of the Laurel regime.

Part of the American press called for harsh measures against the Franco regime, and on November 6, the new U.S. Undersecretary of State Edward Stettinius Jr. ordered the U.S. Ambassador in Madrid, Carlton Hayes, to demand that the Spanish government impose a total embargo on tungsten exports to Germany and expel German agents in Tangier, occupied by Spain on June 14, 1940.

== Development ==
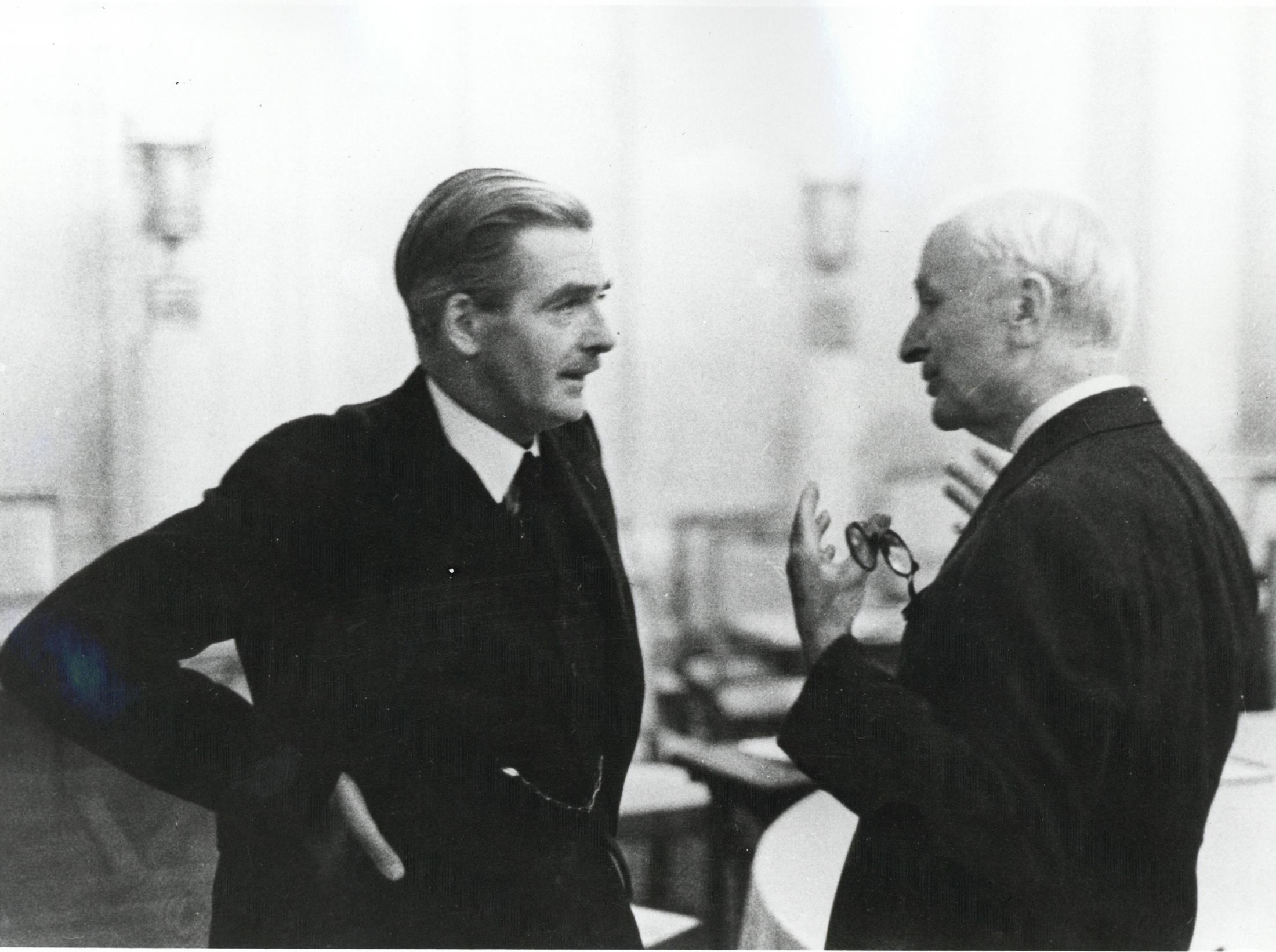
Anthony Eden, UK Foreign Secretary (left), with U.S. Secretary of State Cordell Hull (right)

The high demand for this scarce strategic mineral in war time had created a bubble in prices, with the otherwise desolate post-Civil War Spanish economy heftily profiting from it, as its income from tungsten exports had increased from £73,000 in 1940 to £15.7 million in 1943. Tungsten exports accounted for nearly 1% of the Spanish GDP and 20% of its exports by 1943–44. Despite intense Allied pressure, General Franco initially ignored U.S. demands to halt these exports.On 18 November 1943, the United States Ambassador to Spain delivered a memorandum to the Spanish Ministry of Foreign Affairs demanding for the unconditional end to tungsten exports to Germany.

On January 3, 1944, Ambassador Hayes issued an ultimatum to Gómez-Jordana, stating that tungsten exports to Germany must cease immediately. Receiving no satisfactory response, the U.S. government imposed an embargo on oil supplies. After the repeated refusal by Spain to comply with the U.S. demand, the United States decreed an embargo on oil supplies to Spain on 28 January 1944. Secretary of State Cordell Hull stated that the embargo was due to Spain selling tungsten to the Germans, thereby contributing to their war effort. Another reason for the embargo was the subversive activities of the Falange Foreign Service in Latin America, which had long concerned the U.S. Additionally, restrictions on Spanish exports of cotton products was enforced, threatening the Catalan textile industry. Simultaneously, Foreign Secretary Anthony Eden denounced in the House of Commons the continued assistance Spain provided to Germany.

The Spanish press—controlled by the Franco regime and heavily influenced by Nazi propaganda chief in Madrid, Josef Hans Lazar—did not report the true reasons for the oil embargo, instead framing it as pressure on Franco to abandon neutrality in favor of the Allies, a narrative echoed by official spokespersons. It was also claimed that the embargo resulted from machinations by exiled Spanish Republicans. Meanwhile, pro-Axis propaganda intensified in the press and on radio.

However, General Franco was forced to yield. On February 17, Gómez-Jordana offered British Ambassador Samuel Hoare a reduction in tungsten exports to “an insignificant amount, of no real military value to Germany,” adding that “Spain had done the Allies a great service by not entering the war.” Hoare relayed the offer to his U.S. counterpart, but Secretary Hull rejected it, stating, “It is not customary in the community of nations for a country to assume it is rendering a great service to its neighbors by not attacking them”: “We cannot justify sacrificing to support Spain’s economy if the Spanish government lacks the will to reciprocate our cooperative disposition; that is, to take the step, fully consistent with Spanish neutrality, of declaring a permanent embargo on tungsten exports.” On February 21, Ambassador Hayes conveyed his government’s firm stance to Gómez-Jordana. Gómez-Jordana then added further concessions, including the repatriation of the last members of the former Blue Division, leaving only a battalion in Germany, which would continue fighting until the war’s end.

However, when Gómez-Jordana presented the negotiation outcomes to the government, some ministers opposed them, citing the economic harm from the near-elimination of tungsten export revenues. General Carlos Asensio, the Army Minister, also objected, viewing it as a capitulation to the Allies and a futile gesture since they “consider themselves incompatible with our Regime” and “only want to overthrow it, and the Caudillo.” Meanwhile, Franco told Portugal’s economy minister, visiting Madrid, that he was unconcerned about the oil embargo because he planned to produce synthetic fuel from oil shale, disregarding its enormous cost. Yet, the embargo was wreaking havoc on the Spanish economy, and, for example, no tanks or armored vehicles participated in the Victory Parade on April 1, 1944.

The agreement was signed on April 29, 1944, by representatives of Spain, the United States, and Great Britain and was ratified and publicized on May 1. In the House of Commons, Anthony Eden, Foreign Secretary, explained that the Franco government had been forced to accept nearly all demands: tungsten sales to Germany were reduced to 40 tons per month; the German consulate in Tangier was closed; and all Spanish volunteers were withdrawn from the Eastern Front, with German spies and saboteurs in Spain also to be expelled. Falangist sectors, however, viewed the agreement as a capitulation to the Allies.

Ultimately, General Franco, who initially resisted abandoning tungsten sales, instructed Gómez-Jordana to reach an agreement with the Allies.On 2 May 1944 a secret deal was signed between Spain, the U.S., and the United Kingdom, in which Spain, in exchange for the reestablishment of oil supplies and a compromise for negotiating future economic concessions, pledged to drastically limit tungsten exports to Germany (a cap of 20 tonnes in May, 20 tonnes in June, and 40 tonnes from then on), to close the German Consulate in Tangiers and expel its members, to prevent any logistic support to Germans in airports, to expel German spies and saboteurs from Spanish soil, to solve a litigation regarding Italian ships trapped in the Balearic Islands, and to recall the last remaining Spanish volunteers on the Eastern Front. Despite their capitulation, Spanish diplomats sold the deal as a success, as they had negotiated the Allied demand for full termination of tungsten exports to Germany down to a cap on exports to a "symbolic" amount. The U.S., the most uncompromising party in principle, blamed the failure to achieve a complete end to the exports on the British diplomacy, while Winston Churchill kindly commended Spain for its "services" in a late May intervention in the House of Commons.

Nevertheless, Francoist propaganda portrayed the agreement as a triumph for the Caudillo and a demonstration of good relations with the Allies, unaffected by “any contingency” (alluding to Hitler’s possible defeat). Germany protested vigorously, to which Franco replied that he could take no further risks. Yet, despite the agreement, Franco continued supporting the Germans, and “German observation posts, radio interception stations, and radar installations remained in Spain until the war’s end.” “Influenced by biased reports of the war situation, which told him what he wanted to hear, Franco continued betting on both sides.”

== Consequences ==
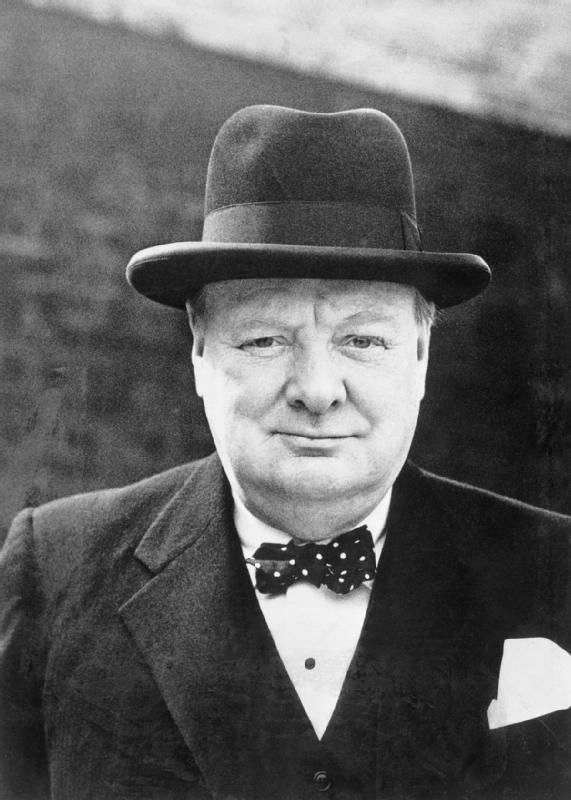
Winston Churchill in 1944.

Three weeks later, on May 24, just days before the Normandy landings, British Prime Minister Winston Churchill delivered a speech in the House of Commons praising Spain’s neutrality and expressing hope that Spain would become “a strong influence for peace in the Mediterranean after the war. Spain’s internal political problems are a matter for the Spanish people. It is not for us, that is, the government, to interfere in them.” The Spanish press widely publicized the speech, interpreting it as support for the Franco regime. However, President Roosevelt stated that he did not share this friendly view of the Spanish regime, noting that “a great deal of Spanish material has been shipped to Germany,” prompting a protest note from the Spanish ambassador in Washington. Churchill justified his speech in a letter to Roosevelt, stating that “after the war, I do not want a peninsula hostile to the British.”

== Bibliography ==
- Bowen, Wayne H. (2006). Spain During World War II [Spain During World War II]. University of Missouri Press.
- Preston, Paul (1998) [1993]. Franco «Caudillo de España» [Franco. A Biography] (First edition in Mitos Bolsillo ed.). Barcelona: Grijalbo Mondadori. ISBN 84-397-0241-8.
- Suárez Fernández, Luis (2011). Franco. Los años decisivos. 1931-1945 [Franco. The Decisive Years. 1931-1945] (in Spanish). Barcelona: Ariel. ISBN 978-84-344-1332-0.
- Buchanan, Andrew N. (2009). "Washington's 'silent ally' in World War II? United States policy towards Spain, 1939–1945". Journal of Transatlantic Studies. 7 (2): 93–117. doi:10.1080/14794010902868199. ISSN 1479-4012. S2CID 144649684.
- Buchanan, Andrew (2014). American Grand Strategy in the Mediterranean during World War II. Cambridge University Press. ISBN 9781107661356.
- Caruana de las Cagigas, Leonardo; González Calleja, Eduardo (2014). "La producción y contrabando de wolframio en España durante la Primera Guerra Mundial" (PDF). Ayer: 183–209.
- Collado Seidel, Carlos (1994). "¿De Hendaya a San Francisco? Londres y Washington contra Franco y la Falange (1942-1945)". Espacio, Tiempo y Forma. Serie V, Historia Contemporánea (in Spanish) (7). Madrid: Universidad Nacional de Educación a Distancia. doi:10.5944/etfv.7.1994.3007. ISSN 1130-0124.
- Fernández de Miguel, Daniel (2012). El enemigo yanqui: Las raices conservadoras del antiamericanismo español (in Spanish). Santander: Universidad de Cantabria. ISBN 9788494018633.
- Moradiellos, Enrique (2016). "España y la segunda guerra mundial, 1939-1945: entre resignaciones neutralistas y tentaciones beligerantes" (PDF). In Carlos Navajas Zubeldia & Diego Iturriaga Barco (ed.). Siglo. Actas del V Congreso Internacional de Historia de Nuestro Tiempo. Logroño: Universidad de la Rioja. pp. 72–73.
