= Villarino =

Villarino may refer to:

- Basilio Villarino, Spanish Royal Navy captain, explorer and writer
- Ahigal de Villarino, village and municipality in Salamanca, Spain
- Villarino de los Aires, municipality in Salamanca, Spain
- Villarino Partido, partido in Buenos Aires Province, Argentina named after the explorer
- ARA Villarino, 1880s Argentine Navy steamer named after the explorer
- Basilio Villarino Bridge, named after the explorer, connecting the Argentinian cities of Viedma and Carmen de Patagones
- Villarino Lake, named after the explorer, in the province of Neuquen, Argentina
- Villarino River, connecting Villarino lake with Falkner lake, also in Neuquen, Argentina
