= Casimiro Hernández Calvo =

Spanish politician (1941–2024)

Casimiro Hernández Calvo (15 November 1941 – 15 April 2024) was a Spanish politician. He was the mayor of Vilvestre in the Province of Salamanca from 1979 to 1995, a member of the provincial deputation for the same years, and a member of the Senate of Spain from 1986 to 2000.

Born in Cerezal de Peñahorcada, he was a member of the Union of the Democratic Centre (UCD) before moving to the People's Alliance (AP) in the early 1980s, which then became the People's Party (PP). In 1991, he obtained the first right-leaning majority in the provincial deputation (13 of 25 seats), but was not installed as president as the 11 from the Spanish Socialist Workers' Party (PSOE) obtained the support of the one CDS deputy and José Jesús Dávila Rodríguez, from Hernández Calvo's own party. The Davilazo incident was condemned by PP founder Manuel Fraga as "the greatest shame since Viriathus's betrayal".

From 1993, Hernández Calvo's power base in the party in the province was weakened due to the rise of young figures Julián Lanzarote, Alfonso Fernández Mañueco and Gonzalo Robles. Between 1995 and Hernández Calvo's death, the PP retained hegemony in both municipal and provincial politics in Salamanca.
