= Brincones =

- Municipality
- Location in Salamanca

- Location in Spain
- Coordinates: 41°06′42″N 6°20′57″W
- Country: Spain
- Autonomous community: Castile and León
- Province: Salamanca
- Comarca: Vitigudino
- Subcomarca: La Ramajería

Government
  - Mayor: José Hernández Salvador (PSOE)

Area
  - Total: 15 km^{2} (5.8 sq mi)
- Elevation: 765 m (2,510 ft)

Population (2025-01-01)
  - Total: 56
  - Density: 3.7/km^{2} (9.7/sq mi)
- Time zone: UTC+1 (CET)
  - Summer (DST): UTC+2 (CEST)
- Postal code: 37217

Brincones is a village and municipality in the province of Salamanca, western Spain, part of the autonomous community of Castile-Leon. It is 45 kilometres (28 mi) from the provincial capital city of Salamanca, has a population of 58 people and lies 765 metres (2,510 ft) above sea level.
