= Saldeana =

- Municipality
- Coat of arms

- Location in Salamanca

- Location in Spain
- Coordinates: 41°1′14″N 6°38′24″W
- Country: Spain
- Autonomous community: Castile and León
- Province: Salamanca
- Comarca: Vitigudino
- Subcomarca: La Ramajería

Government
  - Mayor: Isabel Pérez Martín (PSOE)

Area
  - Total: 21 km^{2} (8.1 sq mi)
- Elevation: 677 m (2,221 ft)

Population (2025-01-01)
  - Total: 96
  - Density: 4.6/km^{2} (12/sq mi)
- Time zone: UTC+1 (CET)
  - Summer (DST): UTC+2 (CEST)
- Postal code: 37259

Saldeana is a municipality located in the province of Salamanca, Castile and León, Spain. As of 2016 the municipality has a population of 119 inhabitants.
