= Peralejos de Arriba =

- Municipality
- Location in Salamanca

- Location in Spain
- Coordinates: 41°00′20″N 6°21′21″W
- Country: Spain
- Autonomous community: Castile and León
- Province: Salamanca
- Comarca: Vitigudino
- Subcomarca: Tierra de Vitigudino

Government
  - Mayor: Gregorio Rodríguez López (People's Party)

Area
  - Total: 33 km^{2} (13 sq mi)
- Elevation: 789 m (2,589 ft)

Population (2025-01-01)
  - Total: 38
  - Density: 1.2/km^{2} (3.0/sq mi)
- Time zone: UTC+1 (CET)
  - Summer (DST): UTC+2 (CEST)
- Postal code: 37216

Peralejos de Arriba is a municipality located in the province of Salamanca, Castile and León, Spain. As of 2016, the municipality has a population of 62 inhabitants.
