= Villar de Samaniego =

- Municipality
- Location in Salamanca

- Location in Spain
- Coordinates: 41°07′01″N 6°26′00″W
- Country: Spain
- Autonomous community: Castile and León
- Province: Salamanca
- Comarca: Vitigudino
- Subcomarca: La Ramajería

Government
  - Mayor: Graciliano González Martín (People's Party)

Area
  - Total: 28 km^{2} (11 sq mi)
- Elevation: 745 m (2,444 ft)

Population (2025-01-01)
  - Total: 79
  - Density: 2.8/km^{2} (7.3/sq mi)
- Time zone: UTC+1 (CET)
  - Summer (DST): UTC+2 (CEST)
- Postal code: 37217

Villar de Samaniego is a village and municipality located in the province of Salamanca, western Spain, part of the autonomous community of Castile and León. It is located 81 kilometres from the provincial capital city of Salamanca and has a population of 119 people.

== Geography ==
The municipality covers an area of 28 km^{2}. It lies 745 metres above sea level and the post code is 37218.
