= Vilvestre =

- Municipality
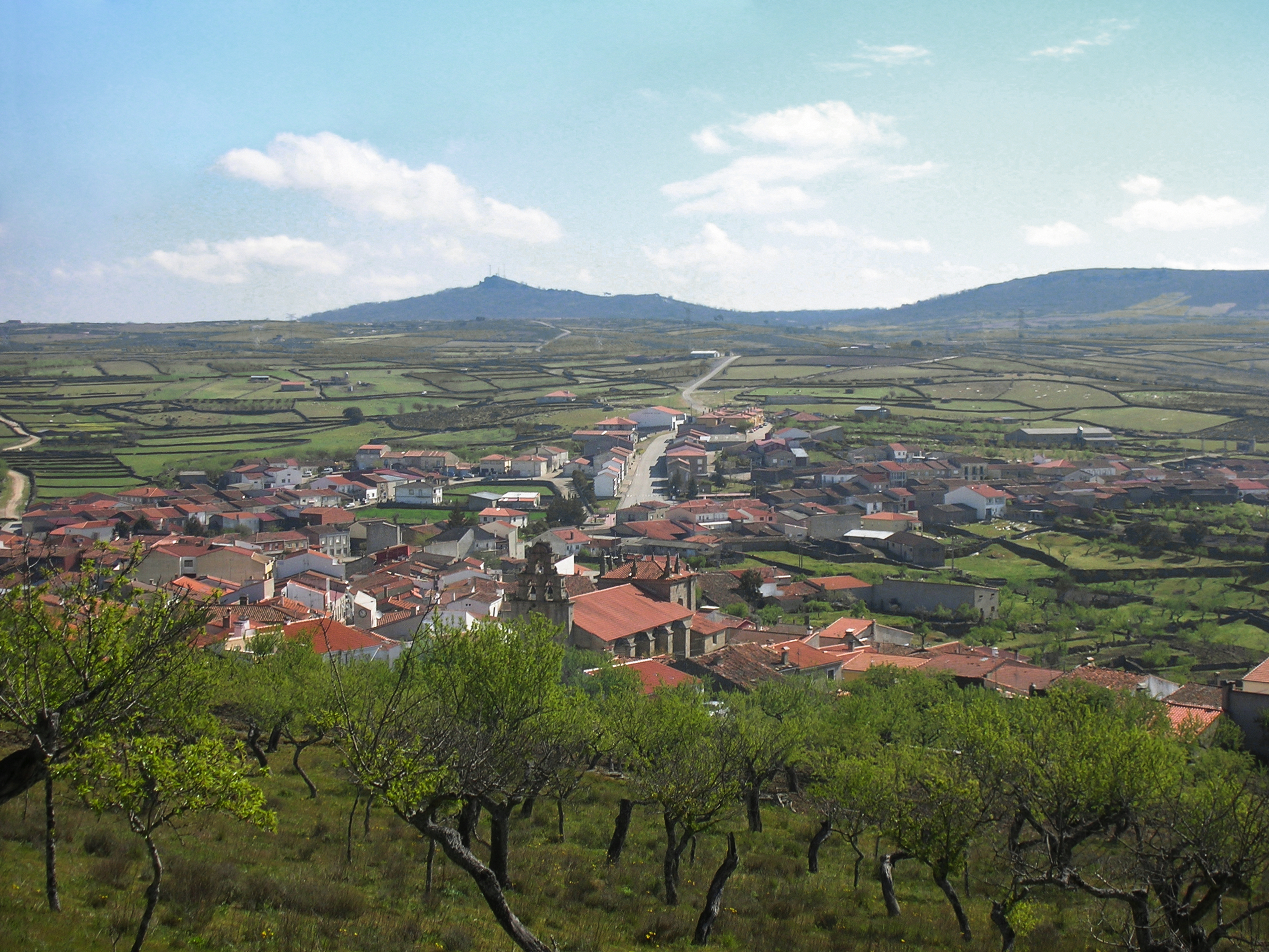
- View of Vilvestre

- Flag Coat of arms

- Location of Vilvestre in Salamanca

- Location in Spain
- Coordinates: 41°06′11″N 6°43′07″W
- Country: Spain
- Autonomous community: Castile and León
- Province: Salamanca
- Comarca: Vitigudino
- Subcomarca: La Ribera de Salamanca

Government
  - Mayor: Juan Ángel Gorjón (AV)

Area
  - Total: 46.52 km^{2} (17.96 sq mi)
- Elevation: 592 m (1,942 ft)

Population (2025-01-01)
  - Total: 374
  - Density: 8.04/km^{2} (20.8/sq mi)
- Time zone: UTC+1 (CET)
  - Summer (DST): UTC+2 (CEST)
- Postal code: 37258
- Area code: 34 (Spain) + 923 (Salamanca)
- Website: www.vilvestre.es

Vilvestre is a village and municipality in the province of Salamanca, western Spain, part of the autonomous community of Castile-Leon. It is located 96 kilometres from the provincial capital city of Salamanca and has a population of 468 people.

== Geography ==
The municipality covers an area of 47 km^{2}. It lies 592 metres above sea level and the postal code is 37258.

== Climate ==
Situated on the Río Duero, the climate is typical of the Mediterranean with orange and olive groves.

== Notable people ==
- Casimiro Hernández Calvo (1941–2024), mayor of Vilvestre (1979–1995), senator (1986–2000)

== Gallery ==
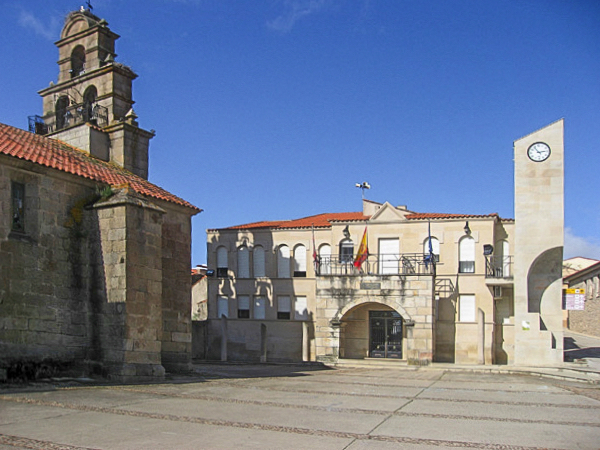
City hall of Vilvestre.

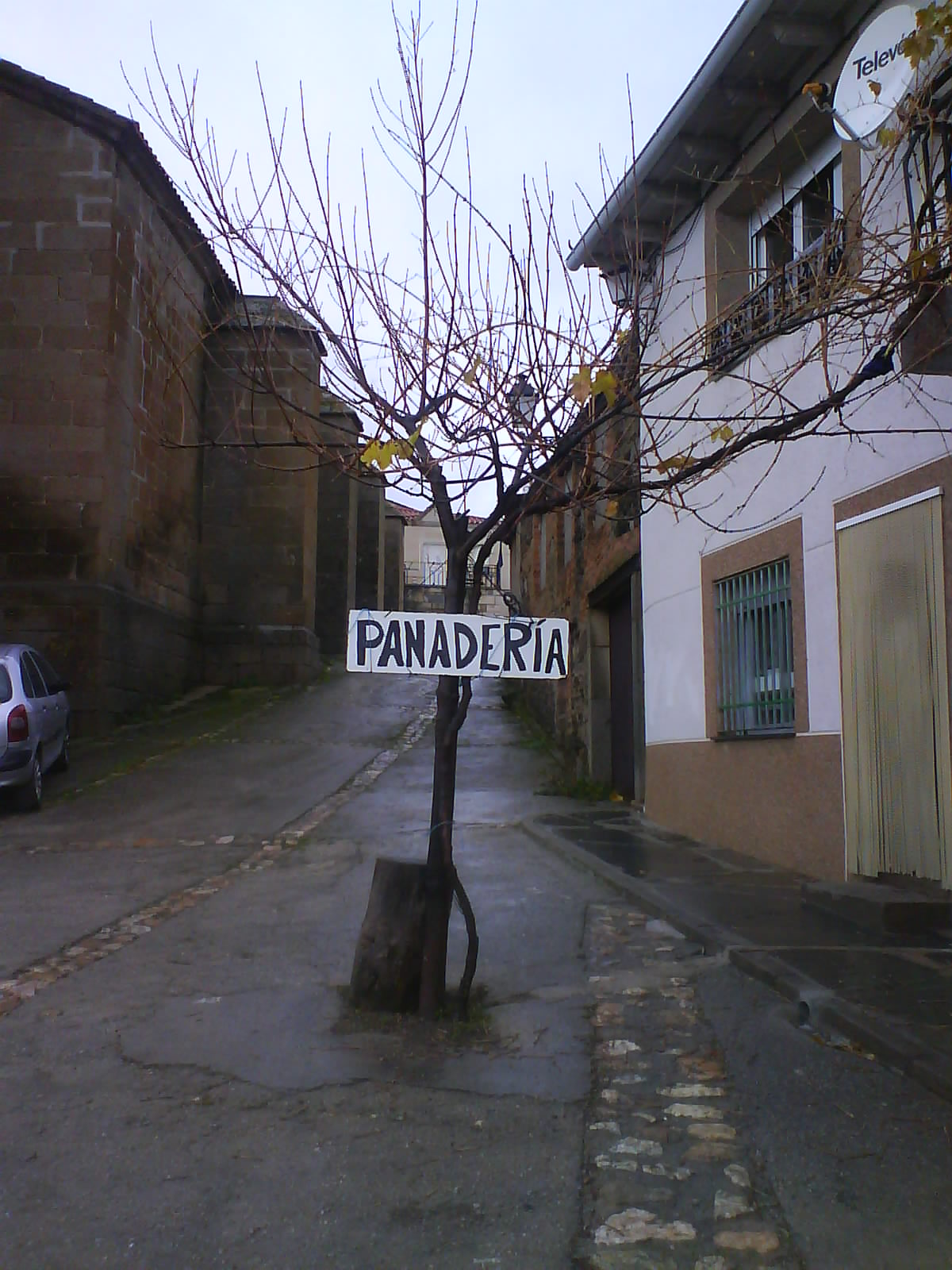
Bakery in Vilvestre.

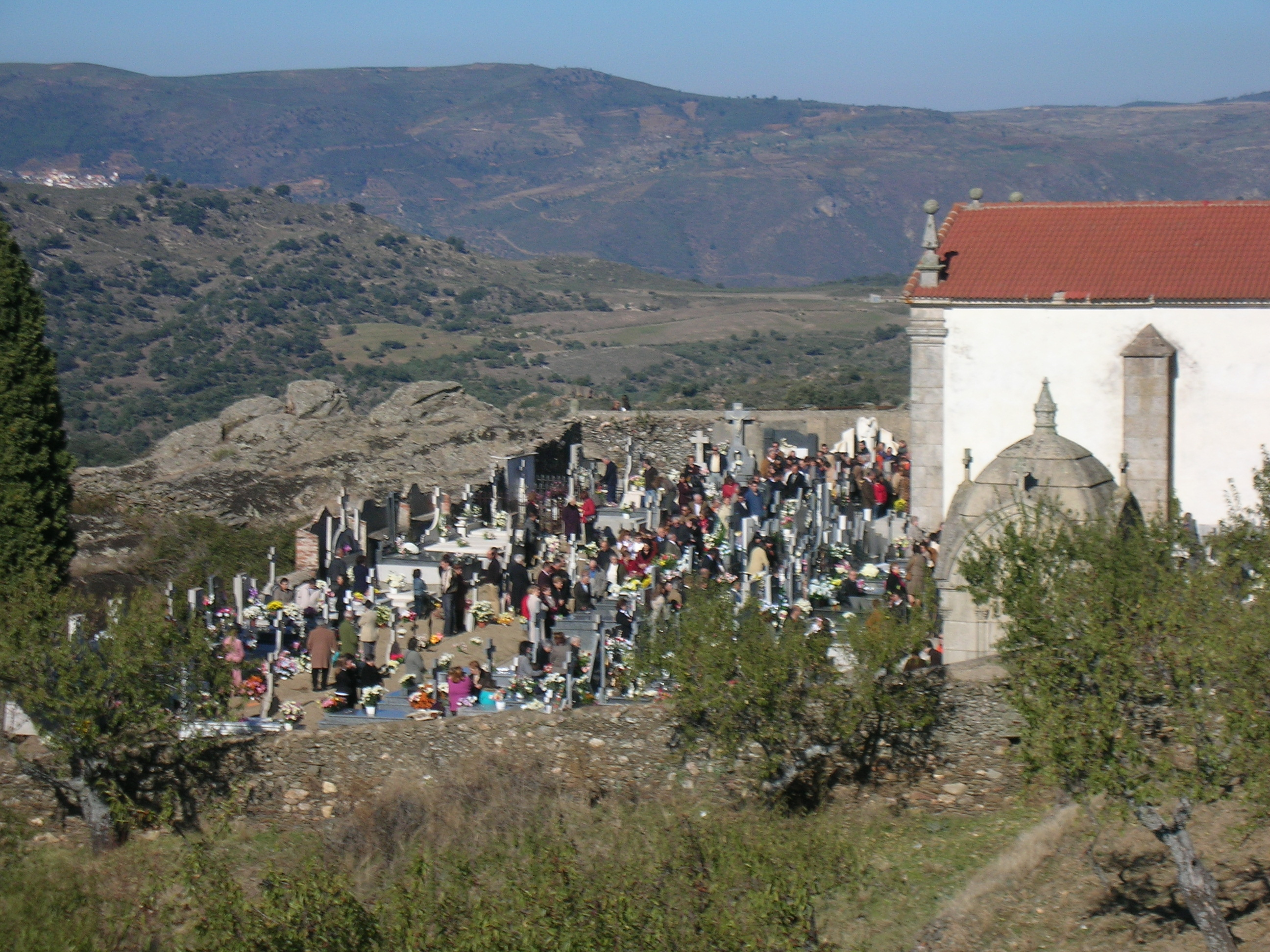
'Todos los Santos' day, Vilvestre.

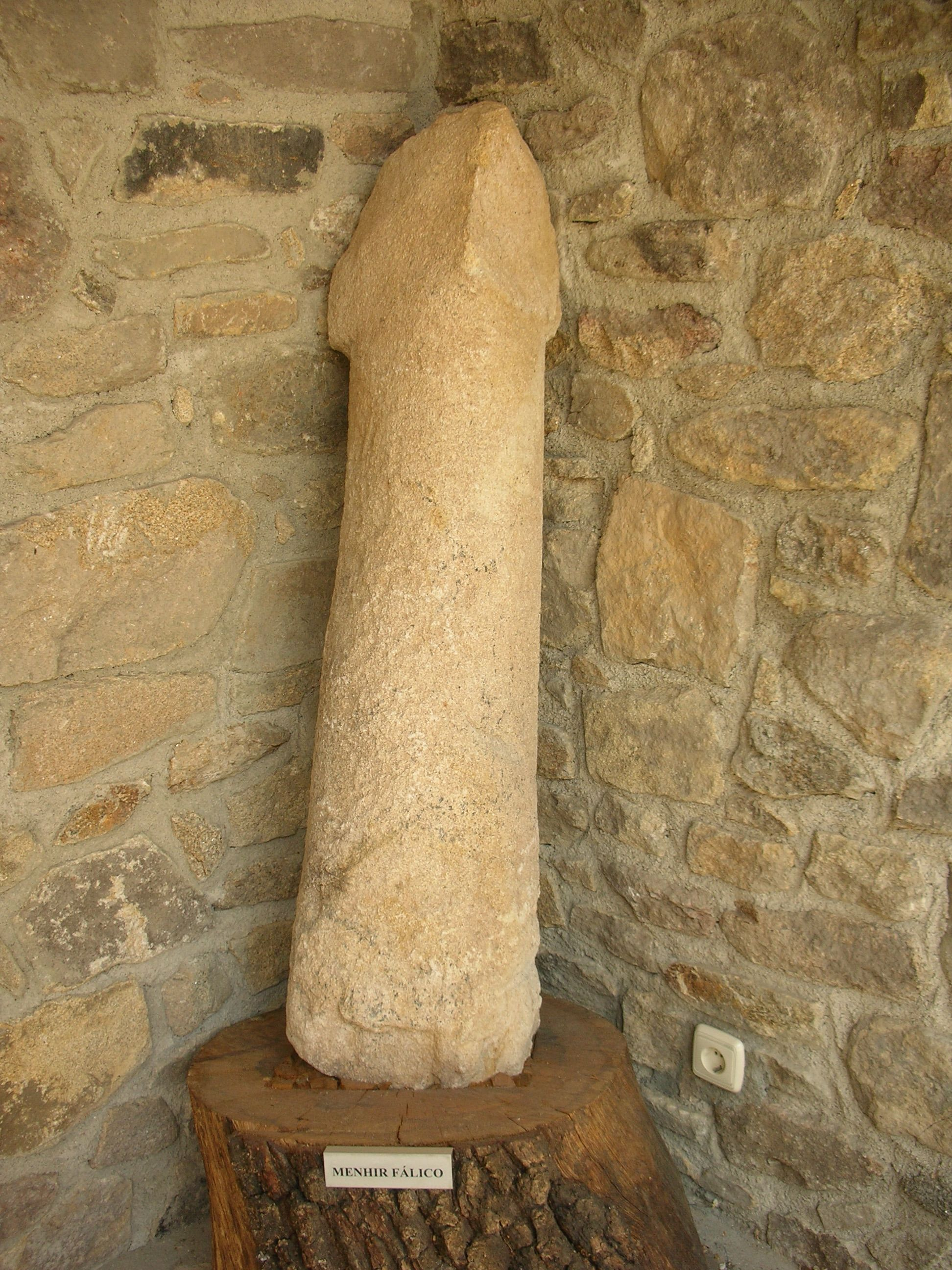
Prehistoric statue of a penis in the Vilvestre Museum.
