= Pozos de Hinojo =

- Municipality
- Coat of arms

- Location in Salamanca
- Coordinates: 40°54′44″N 6°24′40″W
- Country: Spain
- Autonomous community: Castile and León
- Province: Salamanca
- Comarca: Vitigudino
- Subcomarca: Tierra de Vitigudino

Government
  - Mayor: Francisco Sánchez Hernández (People's Party)

Area
  - Total: 59 km^{2} (23 sq mi)
- Elevation: 737 m (2,418 ft)

Population (2025-01-01)
  - Total: 48
  - Density: 0.81/km^{2} (2.1/sq mi)
- Time zone: UTC+1 (CET)
  - Summer (DST): UTC+2 (CEST)
- Postal code: 37216

Pozos de Hinojo is a sparsely populated village and municipality in the province of Salamanca, western Spain, part of the autonomous community of Castile-Leon. It is located 78 kilometres (48 mi) from the provincial capital city of Salamanca and has a population of 51 people.

== Geography ==
The municipality covers an area of 59 km^{2} (23 sq mi). It lies 737 metres (2,418 ft) above sea level and the postal code is 37219.

== See also ==
- List of municipalities in Salamanca
