= La Ramajería =

Coordinates: 41°5′31″N 6°31′39″W

- Comarca
- Location in Salamanca
- Country: Spain
- Autonomous community: Castile and León
- Province: Salamanca
- Comarca: Comarca de Vitigudino

Area
  - Total: 680.13 km^{2} (262.60 sq mi)

Population (2014)
  - Total: 3,362
  - Density: 4.943/km^{2} (12.80/sq mi)
- Time zone: UTC+1 (CET)
  - Summer (DST): CEST

La Ramajería is a subcomarca in the comarca of Vitigudino in the province of Salamanca, Castile and León. It contains 23 municipalities: Ahigal de Villarino, Almendra, Barceo, Barruecopardo, Brincones, Cabeza del Caballo, Cerezal de Peñahorcada, El Manzano, El Milano, Encinasola de los Comendadores, Guadramiro, Iruelos, La Peña, La Vídola, La Zarza de Pumareda, Puertas, Saldeana, Sanchón de la Ribera, Trabanca, Valderrodrigo, Valsalabroso, Villar de Samaniego and Villasbuenas.
