= Encinasola de los Comendadores =

- Municipality
- Location in Salamanca

- Location in Spain
- Coordinates: 41°01′50″N 6°31′57″W
- Country: Spain
- Autonomous community: Castile and León
- Province: Salamanca
- Comarca: Vitigudino
- Subcomarca: La Ramajería

Government
  - Mayor: Francisco Prieto Prieto (People's Party)

Area
  - Total: 34 km^{2} (13 sq mi)
- Elevation: 710 m (2,330 ft)

Population (2025-01-01)
  - Total: 146
  - Density: 4.3/km^{2} (11/sq mi)
- Time zone: UTC+1 (CET)
  - Summer (DST): UTC+2 (CEST)
- Postal code: 37256

Encinasola de los Comendadores is a village and municipality in the province of Salamanca, western Spain, part of the autonomous community of Castile and León. It is located 96 kilometres (60 mi) from the provincial capital city of Salamanca and has a population of 184 people.

== Geography ==
The municipality covers an area of 34 km^{2} (13 sq mi). It lies 710 metres (2,330 ft) above sea level and the postal code is 37256.

== See also ==
- List of municipalities in Salamanca
