= Sanchón de la Ribera =

- Municipality
- Location in Salamanca

- Location in Spain
- Coordinates: 41°5′16″N 6°24′28″W
- Country: Spain
- Autonomous community: Castile and León
- Province: Salamanca
- Comarca: Vitigudino
- Subcomarca: La Ramajería

Government
  - Mayor: Juan Antonio Holgado Sánchez (People's Party)

Area
  - Total: 29 km^{2} (11 sq mi)
- Elevation: 735 m (2,411 ft)

Population (2025-01-01)
  - Total: 66
  - Density: 2.3/km^{2} (5.9/sq mi)
- Time zone: UTC+1 (CET)
  - Summer (DST): UTC+2 (CEST)
- Postal code: 37217

Sanchón de la Ribera is a municipality located in the province of Salamanca, Castile and León, Spain. As of 2016 the municipality has a population of 78 inhabitants.

It belongs to the subcomarca of La Ramajería, a rural area formed by meadows known as 'curtains' and in which popular architecture stands out for having a high degree of conservation. The small farmhouse occupies a hillside on the edge of a small stream that runs around nearby. The land is surrounded by pastures and oak forests.

The town was founded during the repopulation of the Leonese kings between the 10th and 12th centuries and the parish church is preserved from its past under the title of Saint Christopher, patron saint of the place. On the outskirts is the Hermitage of Humilladero, a small 17th-century building with a single nave and which houses the image of the Holy Christ of Mercy, of great devotion among the inhabitants. An old mill, now demolished, on the banks of the Vado, informs us of old activities that are no longer in use.

About 20 kilometers away is the Arribes del Duero Natural Park, a natural space where you can go hiking, among other activities.
