= Guadramiro =

- Municipality
- Flag Coat of arms

- Location in Salamanca

- Location in Spain
- Coordinates: 41°01′03″N 6°29′36″W
- Country: Spain
- Autonomous community: Castile and León
- Province: Salamanca
- Comarca: Vitigudino
- Subcomarca: La Ramajería

Government
  - Mayor: Juan María Moro Criado (People's Party)

Area
  - Total: 150 km^{2} (58 sq mi)
- Elevation: 745 m (2,444 ft)

Population (2025-01-01)
  - Total: 120
  - Density: 0.80/km^{2} (2.1/sq mi)
- Time zone: UTC+1 (CET)
  - Summer (DST): UTC+2 (CEST)
- Postal code: 37219

Guadramiro is a municipality located in the province of Salamanca, in the autonomous community of Castile and León, Spain.
