= Fregeneda–Almendra pegmatitic field =

The Fregeneda–Almendra pegmatitic field is a geologic area in the Iberian Peninsula extending across the Portuguese district of Guarda and the Spanish province of Salamanca. Part of the Central Iberian Zone, it is located in the western part of a narrow E–W metamorphic belt. It consists of a variety of granitic pegmatites, where some rocks are rich in lithium. The Li minerals include spodumene, petalite, lithian muscovite and montebrasite.

A mining site for the extraction of lithium, tin, niobium and tantalium is located in La Fregeneda area.

== Bibliography ==
Bibliography

- Roda Robles, E.; Pesquera Pérez, A.; Velasco Roldán, F; Fontán, F (1999). "The granitic pegmatites of the Fregeneda area (Salamanca, Spain): characteristics and petrogenesis". Mineralogical Magazine. 63 (4): 535–558. doi:10.1180/002646199548709. S2CID 53619076.
- Roda, E.; Vieira, R.; Lima, R; Pesquera, A; Noronha, F; Fontán, F (2007). "The Fregeneda – Almendra pegmatitic field (Spain & Portugal): mineral assemblages and regional zonation" (PDF). Granitic Pegmatites: The State of the Art – International Symposium. 06th – 12th May 2007, Porto, Portugal.
- Roda-Robles, E.; Pesquera, A; Gil-Crespo, P. P.; Vieira, R.; Lima, A; Garate-Olave, I.; Martins, T; Torres-Ruiz, J (2016). "Geology and mineralogy of Li mineralization in the Central Iberian Zone (Spain and Portugal)" (PDF). Mineralogical Magazine. 80 (1): 103–126. doi:10.1180/minmag.2016.080.049. S2CID 131486042. Archived from the original (PDF) on 29 April 2020.
- Roda-Robles, Encarnación; Vieira, Romeu; Pesquera, Alfonso; Lima, Alexandre (2010). "Chemical variations and significance of phosphates from the Fregeneda-Almendra pegmatite field, Central Iberian Zone (Spain and Portugal)". Mineralogy and Petrology. 100 (1–2): 23–34. doi:10.1007/s00710-010-0117-7. S2CID 131665018.
