= Laurel incident =

1943 diplomatic incident

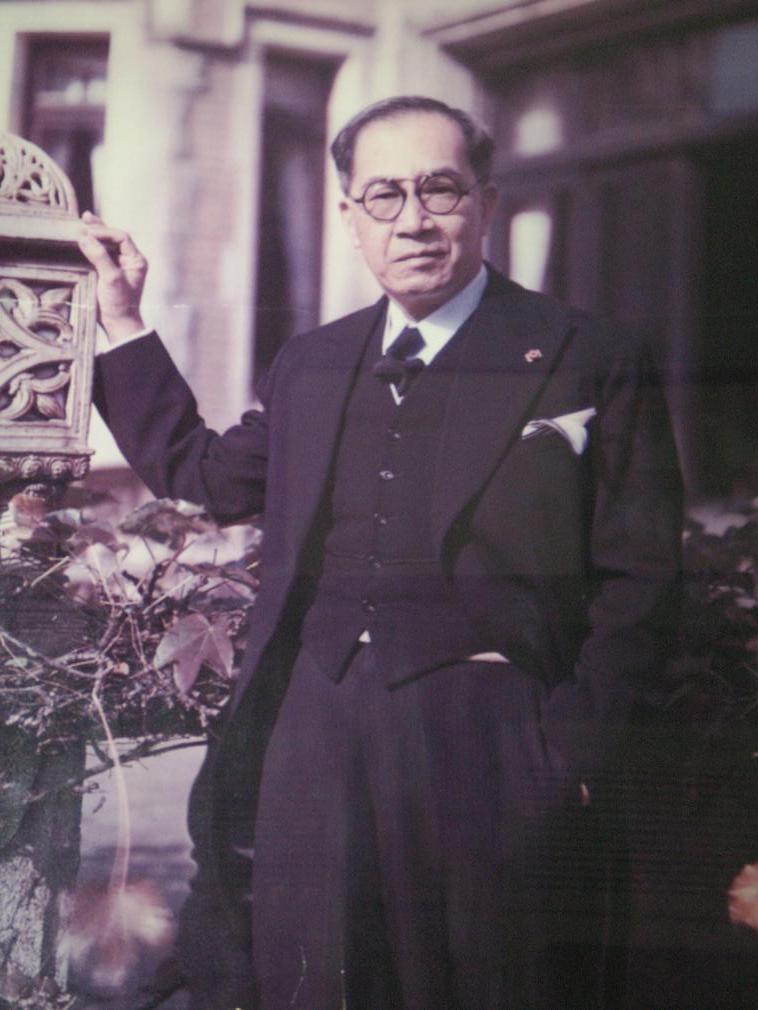
President Jose Laurel in 1943, the year of the incident

The Laurel incident occurred when the United States intercepted a letter of congratulation from Spain's Foreign Ministry to Filipino President José Laurel about the puppet government Second Philippine Republic on 18 October 1943.

While the Francoist State intended the message as a polite response to a message of friendship sent by Laurel, the United States government interpreted the message as Spanish recognition of the new government. Other Axis countries also disseminated the message as a sign of support from Spain.

While Spain maintained a close relationship with the Axis powers, Spain also maintained diplomatic and trade relations with the United States. Spain was dependent on imports of oil and grain, and many in the US had long pushed for a stronger stand against Spain. The Laurel telegram became an important cause in both the press and the U.S. Congress.

Spain was a major producer of tungsten, a crucial material to Germany's war effort. The United States had launched a program at great expense to buy the entirety of Spain's tungsten production, but some still went to feed Germany's war machine. The United States used the incident to put pressure on Spain to stop all exports of tungsten to Germany.

The Allies also wanted Spain to expel German agents from Tangier, the return of Italian ships following the Italian armistice, and landing rights in Spain for Allied commercial planes. However, none of these demands were met.

The denouncement by the United States and Britain prompted Spain to explain that it was only a courtesy greeting and contained no official recognition on the new regime. The crisis resulted in an oil embargo by the United States against Spain.

== See also ==
- Wolfram Crisis
