= Villarmuerto =

- Municipality
- Location in Salamanca
- Coordinates: 41°3′23″N 6°21′44″W
- Country: Spain
- Autonomous community: Castile and León
- Province: Salamanca
- Comarca: Vitigudino
- Subcomarca: Tierra de Vitigudino

Government
  - Mayor: Alfredo Jesús Martín González (People's Party)

Area
  - Total: 39 km^{2} (15 sq mi)
- Elevation: 760 m (2,490 ft)

Population (2025-01-01)
  - Total: 38
  - Density: 0.97/km^{2} (2.5/sq mi)
- Time zone: UTC+1 (CET)
  - Summer (DST): UTC+2 (CEST)
- Postal code: 37217

Villarmuerto is a municipality located in the province of Salamanca, Castile and León, Spain. As of 2016 the municipality has a population of 41 inhabitants.
