= Cipérez =

- municipality
- Flag Coat of arms

- Location in Salamanca

- Location in Spain
- Coordinates: 40°57′46″N 6°15′50″W
- Country: Spain
- Autonomous community: Castile and León
- Province: Salamanca
- Comarca: Vitigudino
- Subcomarca: Tierra de Vitigudino

Government
  - Mayor: Juan Francisco Alonso Ramos (Spanish Socialist Workers' Party)

Area
  - Total: 105 km^{2} (41 sq mi)
- Elevation: 769 m (2,523 ft)

Population (2025-01-01)
  - Total: 233
  - Density: 2.22/km^{2} (5.75/sq mi)
- Time zone: UTC+1 (CET)
  - Summer (DST): UTC+2 (CEST)
- Postal code: 37216

Cipérez is a village and large municipality in the province of Salamanca, western Spain, part of the autonomous community of Castile-Leon. It is located 60 kilometres (37 mi) from the provincial capital city of Salamanca and as of 2016 has a population of 278 people.

== Geography ==
The municipality covers an area of 105 km^{2} (41 sq mi). It lies 769 metres (2,523 ft) above sea level at the center and the postal code is 37216.

== Economy ==
The basis of the economy is agriculture.
