= El Cubo de Don Sancho =

- Municipality
- Coat of arms

- Location in Salamanca

- Location in Spain
- Coordinates: 40°53′N 6°18′W
- Country: Spain
- Autonomous community: Castile and León
- Province: Salamanca
- Comarca: Vitigudino
- Subcomarca: Tierra de Vitigudino

Government
  - Mayor: Emiliano Muñoz Corral (People's Party)

Area
  - Total: 91 km^{2} (35 sq mi)
- Elevation: 736 m (2,415 ft)

Population (2025-01-01)
  - Total: 373
  - Density: 4.1/km^{2} (11/sq mi)
- Time zone: UTC+1 (CET)
  - Summer (DST): UTC+2 (CEST)
- Postal code: 37281

El Cubo de Don Sancho is a large municipality in the province of Salamanca, western Spain, part of the autonomous community of Castile-Leon. It is located 66 kilometres (41 mi) from the provincial capital city of Salamanca and as of 2016 has a population of 463 people.

== Geography ==
The municipality covers an area of 91 km^{2} (35 sq mi). It lies 736 metres (2,415 ft) above sea level and the postal code is 37281.
