= La Vídola =

- Municipality
- Flag Coat of arms

- Location in Salamanca

- Location in Spain
- Coordinates: 41°9′12″N 6°29′16″W
- Country: Spain
- Autonomous community: Castile and León
- Province: Salamanca
- Comarca: Vitigudino
- Subcomarca: La Ramajería

Government
  - Mayor: Ángel Vicente Villoria (People's Party)

Area
  - Total: 30 km^{2} (12 sq mi)
- Elevation: 702 m (2,303 ft)

Population (2025-01-01)
  - Total: 95
  - Density: 3.2/km^{2} (8.2/sq mi)
- Time zone: UTC+1 (CET)
  - Summer (DST): UTC+2 (CEST)
- Postal code: 37214
- ISO 3166 code: ESP

La Vídola is a municipality located in the province of Salamanca, Castile and León, Spain. As of 2016 the municipality has a population of 117 inhabitants.
