= La Peña, Salamanca =

La Peña
- Municipality
- Flag Coat of arms

- Location in Salamanca

- Location in Spain
- Coordinates: 41°10′30″N 06°31′10″W
- Country: Spain
- Autonomous community: Castile and León
- Province: Salamanca
- Comarca: Vitigudino
- Subcomarca: La Ramajería

Government
  - Mayor: José Tomás Hernández Rebollo (People's Party)

Area
  - Total: 25 km^{2} (9.7 sq mi)
- Elevation: 696 m (2,283 ft)

Population (2025-01-01)
  - Total: 69
  - Density: 2.8/km^{2} (7.1/sq mi)
- Time zone: UTC+1 (CET)
  - Summer (DST): UTC+2 (CEST)
- Postal code: 37214

La Peña is a municipality located in the province of Salamanca, Castile and León, Spain.
