= Lumbrales =

- Municipality
- Lumbrales
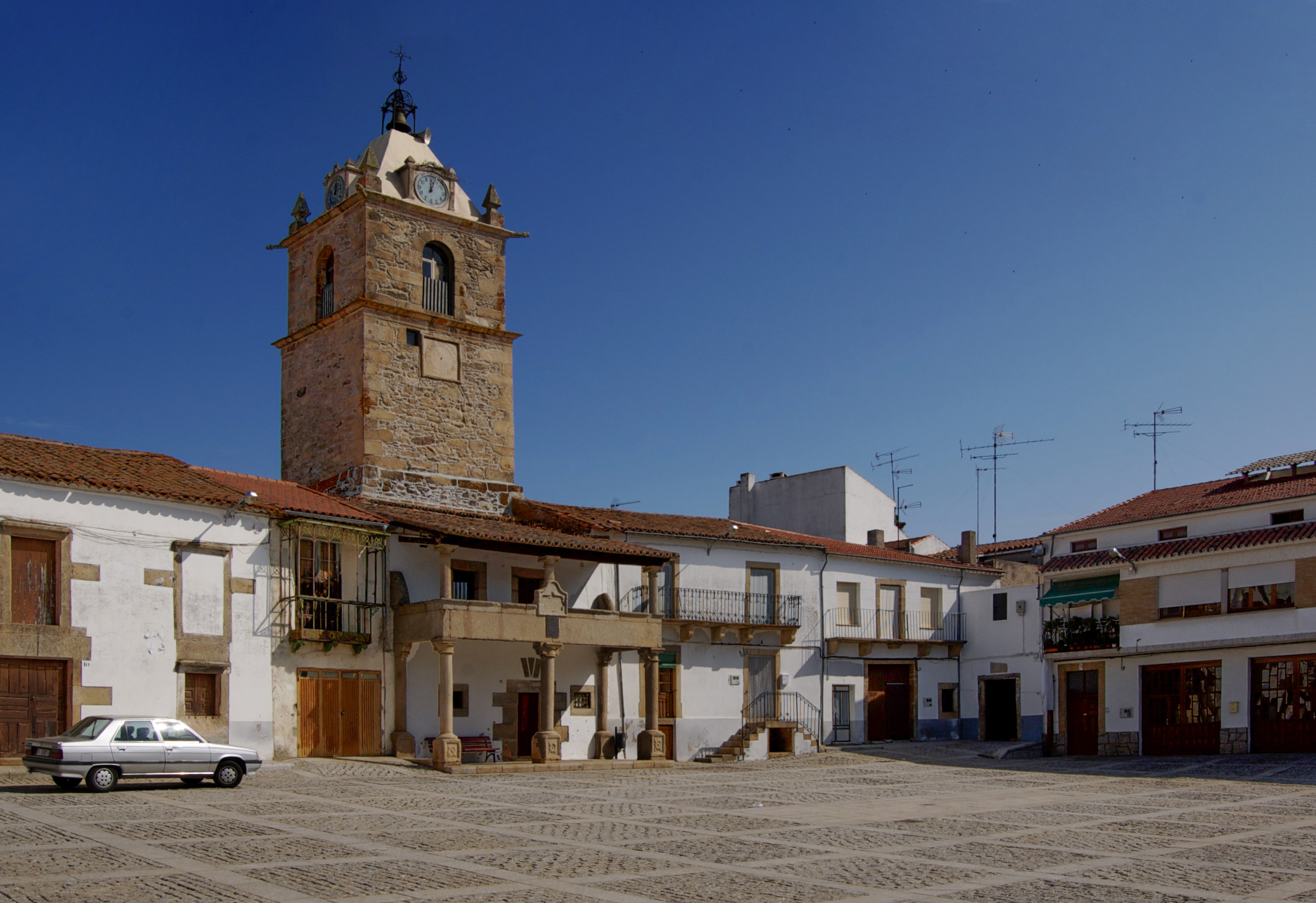

- Flag Coat of arms

- Location in Spain
- Coordinates: 40°56′00″N 6°43′00″W
- Country: Spain
- Autonomous community: Castile and León
- Province: Salamanca
- Comarca: El Abadengo

Government
  - Alcalde (Mayor): Pedro Sánchez Calderon (PP)

Area
  - Total: 70 km^{2} (27 sq mi)
- Elevation: 673 m (2,208 ft)

Population (2025-01-01)
  - Total: 1,507
  - Density: 22/km^{2} (56/sq mi)
- Demonym: Lumbralense
- Time zone: UTC+1 (CET)
  - Summer (DST): UTC+2 (CEST)
- Postal code: 37240
- Website: www.lumbrales.es

Lumbrales is a municipality located in the province of Salamanca, Castile and León, Spain. As of 2018 the municipality has a population of 1,619 inhabitants.

Close to its border with the municipality of Bermellar is the Castro de Las Merchanas, an old Vettonian settlement that stands as one of the most attractive tourist attractions within the Arribes del Duero Natural Park.
