= Peralejos de Abajo =

- Municipality
- Flag Coat of arms

- Location in Salamanca

- Location in Spain
- Coordinates: 41°0′20″N 6°21′52″W
- Country: Spain
- Autonomous community: Castile and León
- Province: Salamanca
- Comarca: Vitigudino
- Subcomarca: Tierra de Vitigudino

Government
  - Mayor: Alfonso Castilla Roso (People's Party)

Area
  - Total: 20 km^{2} (7.7 sq mi)
- Elevation: 755 m (2,477 ft)

Population (2025-01-01)
  - Total: 162
  - Density: 8.1/km^{2} (21/sq mi)
- Time zone: UTC+1 (CET)
  - Summer (DST): UTC+2 (CEST)
- Postal code: 37216

Peralejos de Abajo is a municipality located in the province of Salamanca, Castile and León, Spain. As of 2016 the municipality has a population of 165 inhabitants.
