= Espadaña =

- Municipality
- Location in Salamanca

- Location in Spain
- Coordinates: 41°04′N 6°17′W
- Country: Spain
- Autonomous community: Castile and León
- Province: Salamanca
- Comarca: Vitigudino
- Subcomarca: Tierra de Vitigudino

Area
  - Total: 39 km^{2} (15 sq mi)
- Elevation: 779 m (2,556 ft)

Population (2025-01-01)
  - Total: 32
  - Density: 0.82/km^{2} (2.1/sq mi)
- Time zone: UTC+1 (CET)
  - Summer (DST): UTC+2 (CEST)
- Postal code: 37148

Espadaña is a sparsely populated village and municipality in the province of Salamanca, western Spain, part of the autonomous community of Castile-Leon. It is located 56 kilometres (35 mi) from the provincial capital city of Salamanca and has a population of 32 people. The name of the town originated in espadaña, a certain architectural element common in small churches throughout the Iberian Peninsula.

== Geography ==
The municipality covers an area of 39 km^{2} (15 sq mi). It lies 779 metres (2,556 ft) above sea level and the postal code is 37148.

== See also ==
- List of municipalities in Salamanca
