= El Milano =

- Municipality
- Flag Coat of arms

- Location in Salamanca

- Location in Spain
- Coordinates: 41°05′33″N 6°35′53″W
- Country: Spain
- Autonomous community: Castile and León
- Province: Salamanca
- Comarca: Vitigudino
- Subcomarca: La Ramajería

Government
  - Mayor: José Manuel Vicente Sánchez (People's Party)

Area
  - Total: 23 km^{2} (8.9 sq mi)
- Elevation: 730 m (2,400 ft)

Population (2025-01-01)
  - Total: 88
  - Density: 3.8/km^{2} (9.9/sq mi)
- Time zone: UTC+1 (CET)
  - Summer (DST): UTC+2 (CEST)
- Postal code: 37256

El Milano is a village and municipality in the province of Salamanca, western Spain, part of the autonomous community of Castile-Leon. It is located 83 kilometres (52 mi) from the provincial capital city of Salamanca and has a population of 123 people.

== Geography ==
The municipality covers an area of 23 km^{2} (8.9 sq mi). It lies 730 metres (2,400 ft) above sea level and the postal code is 37256.

== See also ==
- List of municipalities in Salamanca
