= Trabanca =

- Municipality
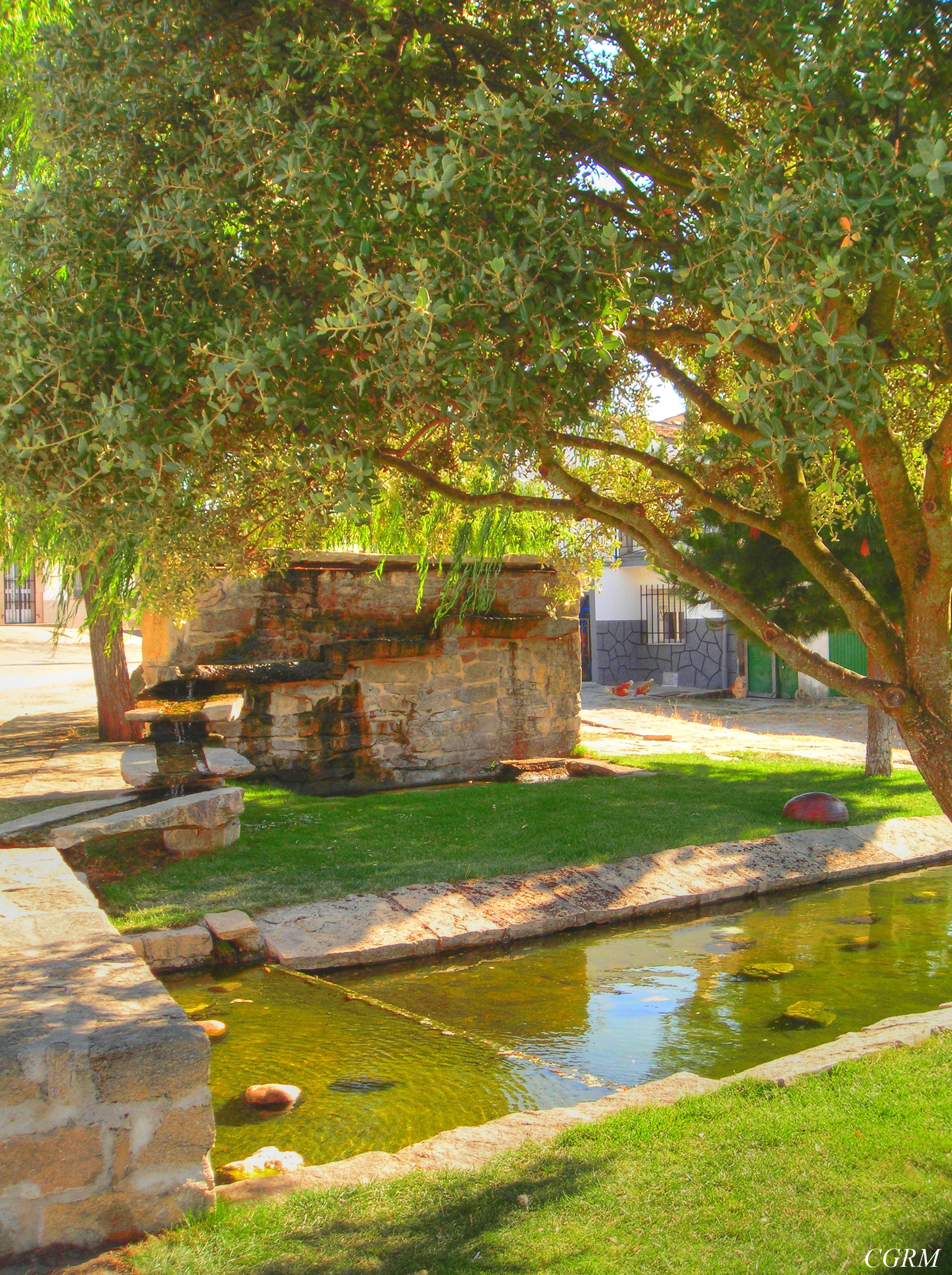
- La fuente de Trabanca

- Coat of arms

- Location in Salamanca

- Location in Spain
- Coordinates: 41°13′59″N 6°23′5″W
- Country: Spain
- Autonomous community: Castile and León
- Province: Salamanca
- Comarca: Vitigudino
- Subcomarca: La Ramajería

Government
  - Mayor: Jesús Borrego Vicente (PSOE)

Area
  - Total: 30 km^{2} (12 sq mi)
- Elevation: 745 m (2,444 ft)

Population (2025-01-01)
  - Total: 159
  - Density: 5.3/km^{2} (14/sq mi)
- Time zone: UTC+1 (CET)
  - Summer (DST): UTC+2 (CEST)
- Postal code: 37173

Trabanca is a municipality located in the province of Salamanca, Castile and León, Spain.
