= Villasbuenas =

- Municipality
- Coat of arms

- Location in Salamanca

- Location in Spain
- Coordinates: 41°3′44″N 6°35′45″W
- Country: Spain
- Autonomous community: Castile and León
- Province: Salamanca
- Comarca: Vitigudino
- Subcomarca: La Ramajería

Government
  - Mayor: Afrodisio Martín Calderon (People's Party)

Area
  - Total: 40 km^{2} (15 sq mi)
- Elevation: 733 m (2,405 ft)

Population (2025-01-01)
  - Total: 158
  - Density: 3.9/km^{2} (10/sq mi)
- Time zone: UTC+1 (CET)
  - Summer (DST): UTC+2 (CEST)
- Postal code: 37256

Villasbuenas is a municipality located in the province of Salamanca, Castile and León, Spain. As of 2016 the municipality has a population of 208 inhabitants.
