= La Zarza de Pumareda =

- Municipality
- Flag Coat of arms

- Location in Salamanca

- Location in Spain
- Coordinates: 41°09′46″N 6°37′39″W
- Country: Spain
- Autonomous community: Castile and León
- Province: Salamanca
- Comarca: Vitigudino
- Subcomarca: La Ramajería

Government
  - Mayor: Francisco Javier Recio Hernández (People's Party)

Area
  - Total: 28 km^{2} (11 sq mi)
- Elevation: 701 m (2,300 ft)

Population (2025-01-01)
  - Total: 131
  - Density: 4.7/km^{2} (12/sq mi)
- Time zone: UTC+1 (CET)
  - Summer (DST): UTC+2 (CEST)
- Postal code: 37253

La Zarza de Pumareda is a village and municipality in the province of Salamanca, western Spain, part of the autonomous community of Castile and León.

== See also ==
- List of municipalities in Salamanca
