= Villar de Peralonso =

- Municipality
- Flag Coat of arms

- Location in Salamanca
- Coordinates: 41°2′1″N 6°13′0″W
- Country: Spain
- Autonomous community: Castile and León
- Province: Salamanca
- Comarca: Vitigudino
- Subcomarca: Tierra de Vitigudino

Government
  - Mayor: Teofilo Fidentino Vicente Vicente (People's Party)

Area
  - Total: 32 km^{2} (12 sq mi)
- Elevation: 820 m (2,690 ft)

Population (2025-01-01)
  - Total: 212
  - Density: 6.6/km^{2} (17/sq mi)
- Time zone: UTC+1 (CET)
  - Summer (DST): UTC+2 (CEST)
- Postal code: 37147

Villar de Peralonso is a municipality located in the province of Salamanca, Castile and León, Spain. As of 2016 the municipality has a population of 249 inhabitants.
