= Valsalabroso =

- Municipality
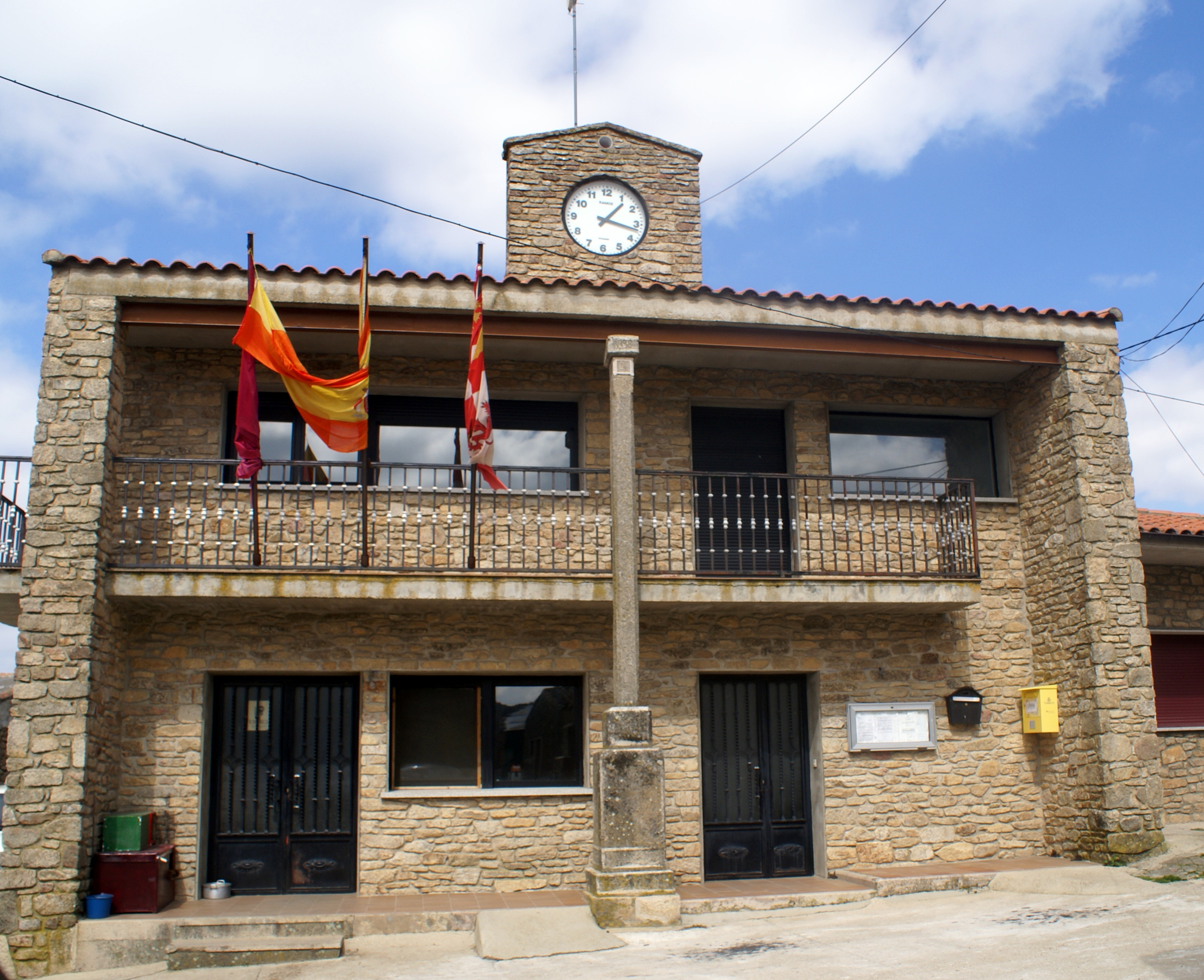
- Town hall

- Location in Salamanca

- Location in Spain
- Coordinates: 41°6′33″N 6°30′5″W
- Country: Spain
- Autonomous community: Castile and León
- Province: Salamanca
- Comarca: Vitigudino
- Subcomarca: La Ramajería

Government
  - Mayor: Emilio Vicente Vicente (People's Party)

Area
  - Total: 27 km^{2} (10 sq mi)
- Elevation: 727 m (2,385 ft)

Population (2025-01-01)
  - Total: 120
  - Density: 4.4/km^{2} (12/sq mi)
- Time zone: UTC+1 (CET)
  - Summer (DST): UTC+2 (CEST)
- Postal code: 37214

Valsalabroso is a municipality located in the province of Salamanca, Castile and León, Spain. As of 2016 the municipality has a population of 146 inhabitants.
