= Almendra, Salamanca =

Almendra
- Municipality
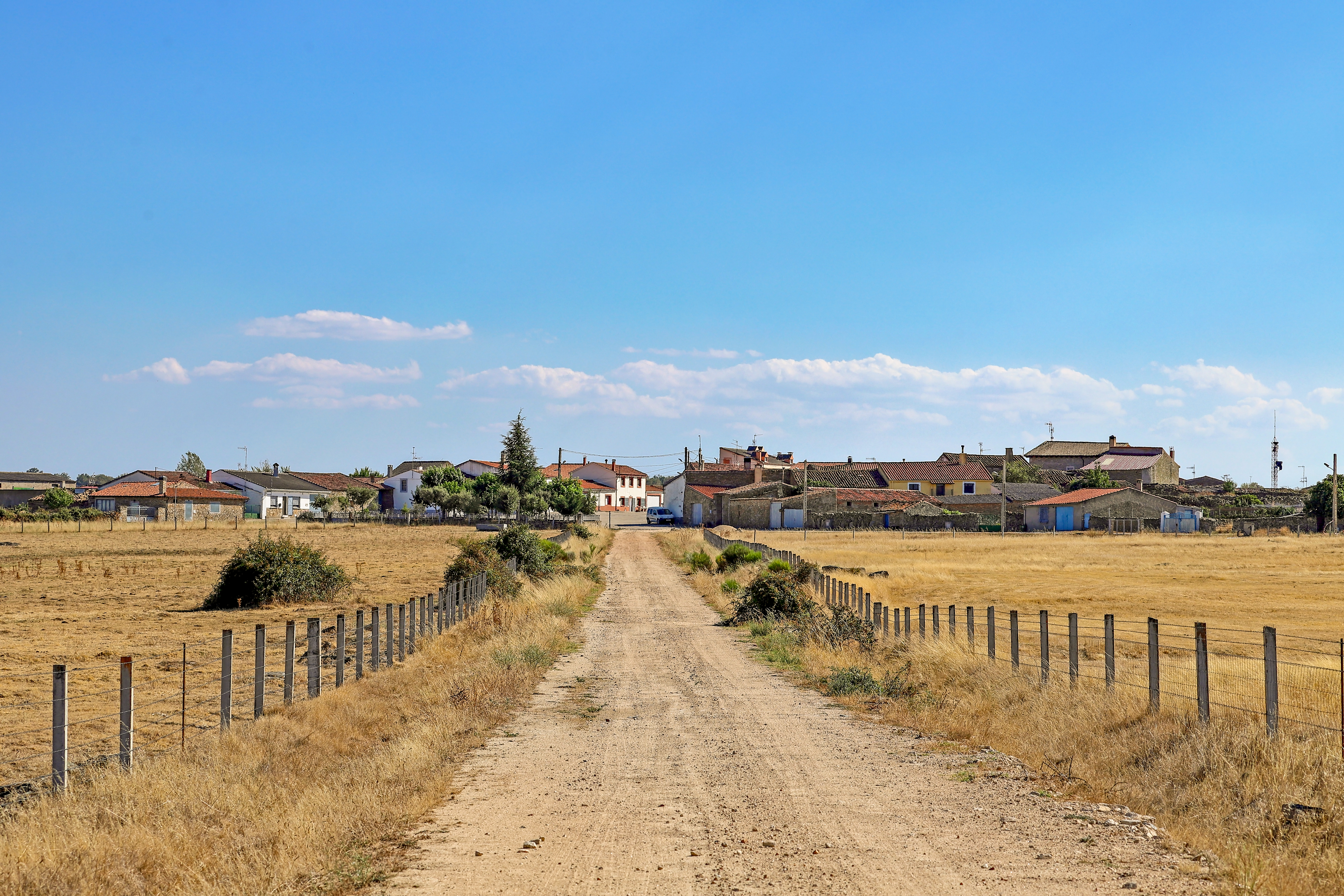

- Coat of arms

- Location in Salamanca

- Location in Spain
- Coordinates: 41°13′47″N 6°20′28″W
- Country: Spain
- Autonomous community: Castile and León
- Province: Salamanca
- Comarca: Vitigudino
- Subcomarca: La Ramajería

Government
  - Mayor: Alejandro Benito Sevillano (People's Party)

Area
  - Total: 39 km^{2} (15 sq mi)
- Elevation: 768 m (2,520 ft)

Population (2025-01-01)
  - Total: 129
  - Density: 3.3/km^{2} (8.6/sq mi)
- Time zone: UTC+1 (CET)
  - Summer (DST): UTC+2 (CEST)
- Postal code: 37176
- Website: almendra.es

Almendra is a village and municipality in the province of Salamanca, western Spain, part of the autonomous community of Castile and León. As of 2016 it has a population of 166 inhabitants.

== See also ==
- Province of Salamanca
- Almendra Dam
