= Tierra de Vitigudino =

- Comarca
- Interactive map of Tierra de Vitigudino
- Country: Spain
- Autonomous community: Castile and León
- Province: Salamanca
- Comarca: Comarca de Vitigudino

Area
  - Total: 594.85 km^{2} (229.67 sq mi)

Population (2012)
  - Total: 4,606
  - Density: 7.743/km^{2} (20.05/sq mi)
- Time zone: UTC+1 (CET)
  - Summer (DST): CEST

Tierra de Vitigudino (occasionally referred to as Campo de Vitigudino) is a subcomarca in the comarca of Vitigudino in the province of Salamanca, Castile and León. It contains the municipalities of Cipérez, El Cubo, Espadaña, Moronta, Peralejos de Abajo, Peralejos de Arriba, Pozos de Hinojo, Villar de Peralonso, Villares de Yeltes, Villarmuerto, Vitigudino and Yecla.
