= Valderrodrigo =

- Municipality
- Location in Salamanca

- Location in Spain
- Coordinates: 41°3′56″N 6°30′31″W
- Country: Spain
- Autonomous community: Castile and León
- Province: Salamanca
- Comarca: Vitigudino
- Subcomarca: La Ramajería

Government
  - Mayor: Eduardo Rodríguez Vicente (People's Party)

Area
  - Total: 22 km^{2} (8.5 sq mi)
- Elevation: 738 m (2,421 ft)

Population (2025-01-01)
  - Total: 129
  - Density: 5.9/km^{2} (15/sq mi)
- Time zone: UTC+1 (CET)
  - Summer (DST): UTC+2 (CEST)
- Postal code: 37256

Valderrodrigo is a municipality located in the province of Salamanca, Castile and León, Spain. As of 2016 the municipality has a population of 151 inhabitants.
