= Barruecopardo =

- Municipality
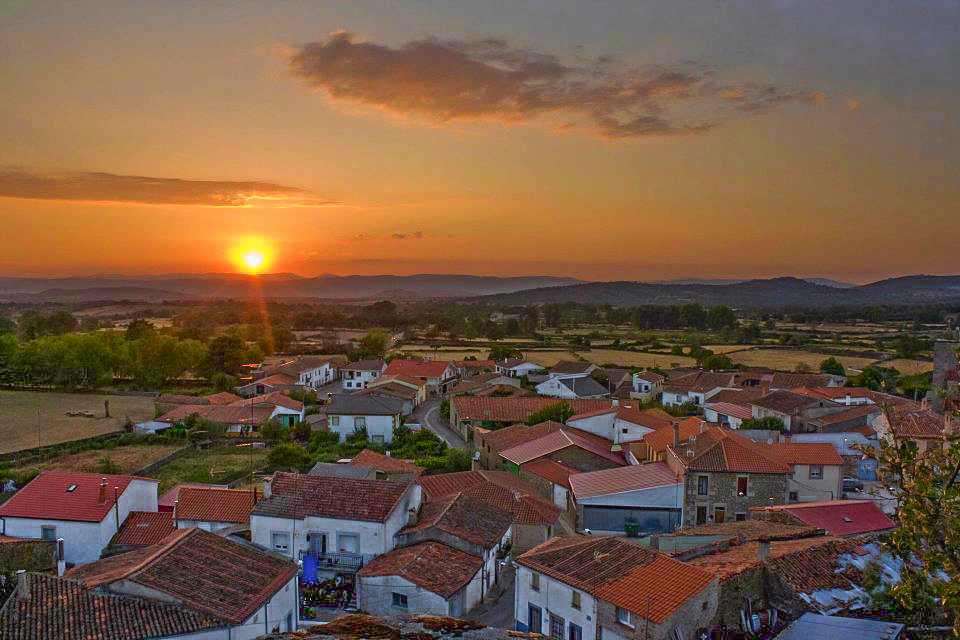

- Coat of arms

- Location in Salamanca

- Location in Spain
- Coordinates: 41°04′21″N 6°39′46″W
- Country: Spain
- Autonomous community: Castile and León
- Province: Salamanca
- Comarca: Vitigudino
- Subcomarca: La Ramajería

Government
  - Mayor: Jesús María Ortiz Fernández (People's Party)

Area
  - Total: 38 km^{2} (15 sq mi)
- Elevation: 730 m (2,400 ft)

Population (2025-01-01)
  - Total: 409
  - Density: 11/km^{2} (28/sq mi)
- Time zone: UTC+1 (CET)
  - Summer (DST): UTC+2 (CEST)
- Postal code: 37255

Barruecopardo is a village and municipality in the province of Salamanca, western Spain, part of the autonomous community of Castile and León. It has a population of 504 people and lies 730 metres (2,400 ft) above sea level.

The postal code is 37255. Barruecopardo mine is a tungsten mine in the vicinity.
