= Barceo =

- Municipality
- Location in Salamanca

- Location in Spain
- Coordinates: 41°03′40″N 6°27′07″W
- Country: Spain
- Autonomous community: Castile and León
- Province: Salamanca
- Comarca: Vitigudino
- Subcomarca: La Ramajería

Government
  - Mayor: Sara Martín Gil (People's Party)

Area
  - Total: 21 km^{2} (8.1 sq mi)
- Elevation: 720 m (2,360 ft)

Population (2025-01-01)
  - Total: 45
  - Density: 2.1/km^{2} (5.5/sq mi)
- Time zone: UTC+1 (CET)
  - Summer (DST): UTC+2 (CEST)
- Postal code: 37217

Barceo is a village and municipality in the province of Salamanca, western Spain, part of the autonomous community of Castile-Leon. It is located 74 kilometres (46 mi) from the city of Salamanca and has a population of 48 people. The municipality covers an area of 21 km^{2} (8.1 sq mi).

The village lies 720 metres (2,360 ft) above sea level.

The postal code is 37215.

== Population development ==
Year	1900	1950	1960	1970	1981	1991	2000	2018
Population	332	248	256	181	122	80	70	46
