= Moronta =

- Municipality
- Location in Salamanca

- Location in Spain
- Coordinates: 40°58′41″N 6°25′56″W
- Country: Spain
- Autonomous community: Castile and León
- Province: Salamanca
- Comarca: Vitigudino
- Subcomarca: Tierra de Vitigudino

Government
  - Mayor: Juan Jesús Mangas Benito (People's Party)

Area
  - Total: 28 km^{2} (11 sq mi)
- Elevation: 764 m (2,507 ft)

Population (2025-01-01)
  - Total: 73
  - Density: 2.6/km^{2} (6.8/sq mi)
- Time zone: UTC+1 (CET)
  - Summer (DST): UTC+2 (CEST)
- Postal code: 37258

Moronta is a municipality located in the province of Salamanca, Castile and León, Spain. As of 2016 the municipality has a population of 80 inhabitants.
