= Yecla de Yeltes =

- Municipality
- Location in Salamanca
- Coordinates: 40°58′50″N 6°26′0″W
- Country: Spain
- Autonomous community: Castile and León
- Province: Salamanca
- Comarca: Vitigudino
- Subcomarca: Tierra de Vitigudino

Government
  - Mayor: Ignacio Abarca Andrés (People's Party)

Area
  - Total: 57 km^{2} (22 sq mi)
- Elevation: 723 m (2,372 ft)

Population (2025-01-01)
  - Total: 223
  - Density: 3.9/km^{2} (10/sq mi)
- Time zone: UTC+1 (CET)
  - Summer (DST): UTC+2 (CEST)
- Postal code: 37219
- Website: www.yecladeyeltes.net

Yecla de Yeltes is a large municipality in the province of Salamanca, western Spain, part of the autonomous community of Castile-Leon. It is located 76 kilometres from the city of Salamanca and as of 2003 has a population 339 people. The municipality covers an area of 57 km^{2}. It lies 723 metres above sea level and the postal code is 37219.
