= Cabeza del Caballo =

- Municipality
- Flag Coat of arms

- Location in Salamanca

- Location in Spain
- Coordinates: 41°07′49″N 6°33′35″W
- Country: Spain
- Autonomous community: Castile and León
- Province: Salamanca
- Comarca: Vitigudino
- Subcomarca: La Ramajería

Government
  - Mayor: Antonio Sánchez Martín (People's Party)

Area
  - Total: 45 km^{2} (17 sq mi)
- Elevation: 732 m (2,402 ft)

Population (2025-01-01)
  - Total: 224
  - Density: 5.0/km^{2} (13/sq mi)
- Time zone: UTC+1 (CET)
  - Summer (DST): UTC+2 (CEST)
- Postal code: 37214

Cabeza del Caballo is a village and municipality in the province of Salamanca, western Spain, part of the autonomous community of Castile-Leon. It is 90 kilometres (56 mi) from the provincial capital city of Salamanca and has a population of 338 people.
