= El Manzano =

- Municipality
- Location in Salamanca

- Location in Spain
- Coordinates: 41°10′27″N 6°17′16″W
- Country: Spain
- Autonomous community: Castile and León
- Province: Salamanca
- Comarca: Vitigudino
- Subcomarca: La Ramajería

Government
  - Mayor: María del Carmen Ruano Delgado (PSOE)

Area
  - Total: 37 km^{2} (14 sq mi)
- Elevation: 779 m (2,556 ft)

Population (2025-01-01)
  - Total: 54
  - Density: 1.5/km^{2} (3.8/sq mi)
- Time zone: UTC+1 (CET)
  - Summer (DST): UTC+2 (CEST)
- Postal code: 37171

El Manzano is a village and large municipality in the province of Salamanca, western Spain, part of the autonomous community of Castile-Leon. It is located 65 kilometres (40 mi) from the provincial capital city of Salamanca and has a population of 74 people.

== Geography ==
The ◅municipality covers an area of 37 km^{2} (14 sq mi).

It lies 779 metres (2,556 ft) above sea level.

The postal code is 37171.

== See also ==
- List of municipalities in Salamanca
