= El Abadengo =

Coordinates: 40°54′55″N 6°40′29″W

- Comarca
- Location in Salamanca
- Country: Spain
- Autonomous community: Castile and León
- Province: Salamanca
- Comarca: Comarca de Vitigudino

Area
  - Total: 742.57 km^{2} (286.71 sq mi)

Population (2014)
  - Total: 5,766
  - Density: 7.765/km^{2} (20.11/sq mi)
- Time zone: UTC+1 (CET)
  - Summer (DST): CEST

El Abadengo is a subcomarca in the comarca of Vitigudino in the province of Salamanca, Castile and León. It contains 14 municipalities: Ahigal de los Aceiteros, Bañobárez, Bermellar, Bogajo, Cerralbo, Fuenteliante, La Fregeneda, Hinojosa de Duero, Lumbrales, Olmedo de Camaces, La Redonda, San Felices de los Gallegos, Sobradillo and Villavieja.
