= Iruelos =

- Municipality
- Location in Salamanca

- Location in Spain
- Coordinates: 41°08′24″N 6°19′44″W
- Country: Spain
- Autonomous community: Castile and León
- Province: Salamanca
- Comarca: Vitigudino
- Subcomarca: La Ramajería

Government
  - Mayor: José Julio Hernández López (People's Party)

Area
  - Total: 36 km^{2} (14 sq mi)
- Elevation: 781 m (2,562 ft)

Population (2025-01-01)
  - Total: 29
  - Density: 0.81/km^{2} (2.1/sq mi)
- Time zone: UTC+1 (CET)
  - Summer (DST): UTC+2 (CEST)
- Postal code: 37217

Iruelos is a municipality located in Salamanca, Castile and León, Spain. As of 2016 the municipality has a population of 36 inhabitants.
