= Cerralbo =

- Municipality
- Location in Salamanca

- Location in Spain
- Coordinates: 40°58′N 6°35′W
- Country: Spain
- Autonomous community: Castile and León
- Province: Salamanca
- Comarca: El Abadengo

Area
  - Total: 52 km^{2} (20 sq mi)
- Elevation: 682 m (2,238 ft)

Population (2025-01-01)
  - Total: 105
  - Density: 2.0/km^{2} (5.2/sq mi)
- Time zone: UTC+1 (CET)
  - Summer (DST): UTC+2 (CEST)
- Postal code: 37291

Cerralbo is a village and large municipality in the province of Salamanca, western Spain, part of the autonomous community of Castile-Leon. It is located 84 kilometres (52 mi) from the provincial capital city of Salamanca and has a population of 170 people.

== Geography ==
The municipality covers an area of 52 km^{2} (20 sq mi). It lies 682 metres (2,238 ft) above sea level and the postal code is 37291.
