= Los Villares de Soria =

Los Villares de Soria, Spain
- Municipality
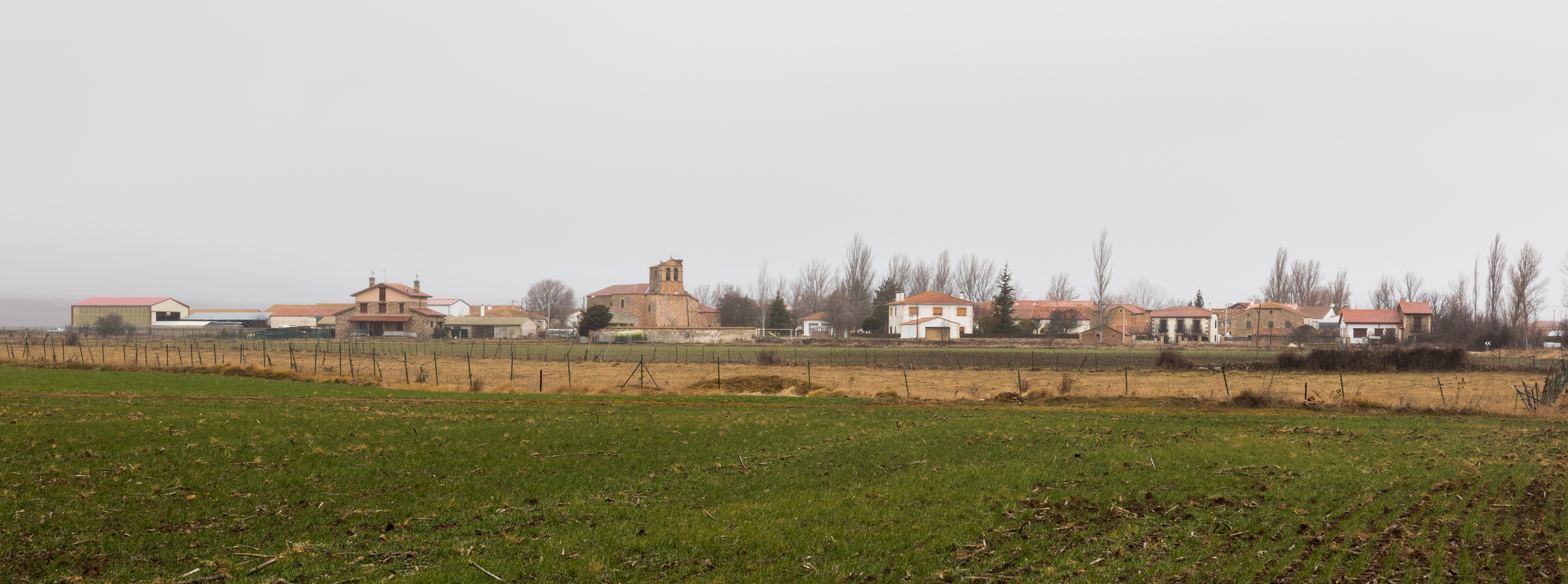
- View of Los Villares de Soria, Spain

- Location in Spain. Los Villares de Soria, Spain (Spain)
- Coordinates: 41°51′52″N 2°21′20″W
- Country: Spain
- Autonomous community: Castile and León
- Province: Soria
- Municipality: Los Villares de Soria

Area
  - Total: 14 km^{2} (5.4 sq mi)

Population (2025-01-01)
  - Total: 72
  - Density: 5.1/km^{2} (13/sq mi)
- Time zone: UTC+1 (CET)
  - Summer (DST): UTC+2 (CEST)
- Website: Official website

Los Villares de Soria is a municipality located in the province of Soria, Castile and León, Spain. According to the 2004 census (INE), the municipality has a population of 117 inhabitants.
