= La Fregeneda =

- Municipality
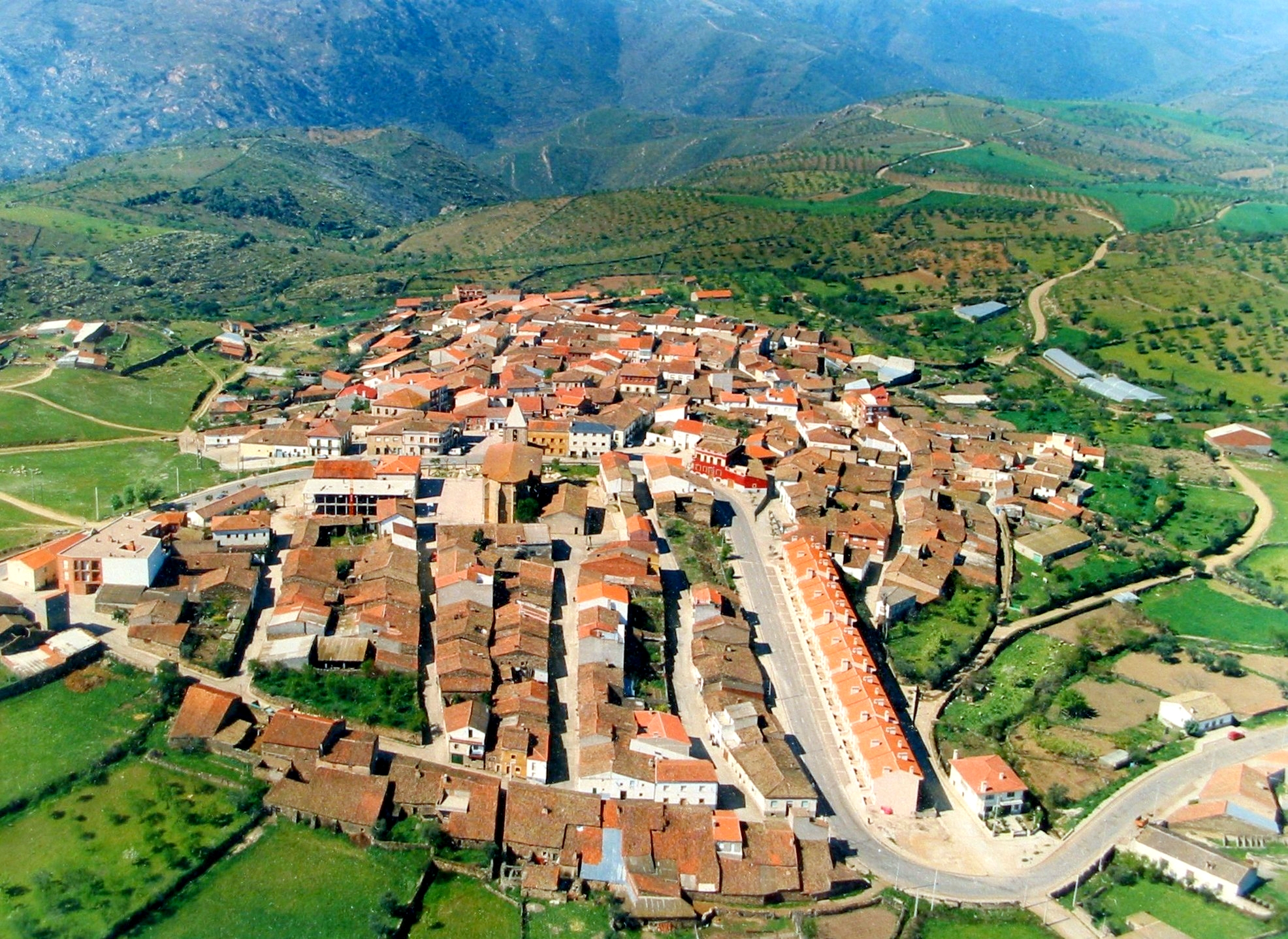

- Flag Coat of arms

- Location in Salamanca

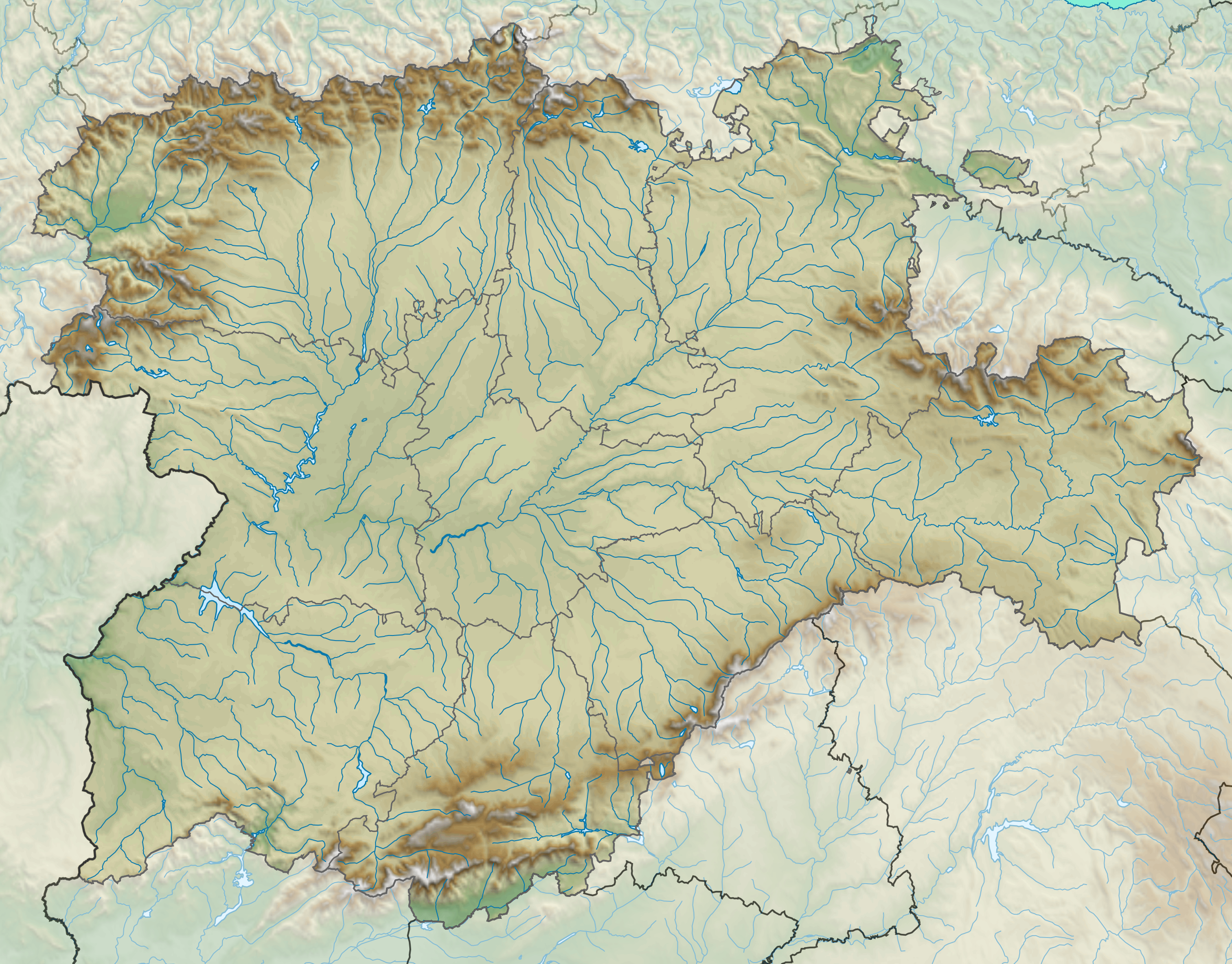
- Location within Spain Location within Castile and León
- Coordinates: 40°59′16″N 6°52′02″W
- Country: Spain
- Autonomous community: Castile and León
- Province: Salamanca
- Comarca: El Abadengo

Government
  - Mayor: Bernardo García Trigo (People's Party)

Area
  - Total: 45 km^{2} (17 sq mi)
- Elevation: 527 m (1,729 ft)

Population (2025-01-01)
  - Total: 296
  - Density: 6.6/km^{2} (17/sq mi)
- Time zone: UTC+1 (CET)
  - Summer (DST): UTC+2 (CEST)
- Postal code: 37220

La Fregeneda is a municipality of Spain located in the province of Salamanca, Castile and León. As of 2016 the municipality has a population of 337 inhabitants.

== See also ==
- Fregeneda–Almendra pegmatitic field
