= Villares de Jadraque =

Villares de Jadraque, Spain
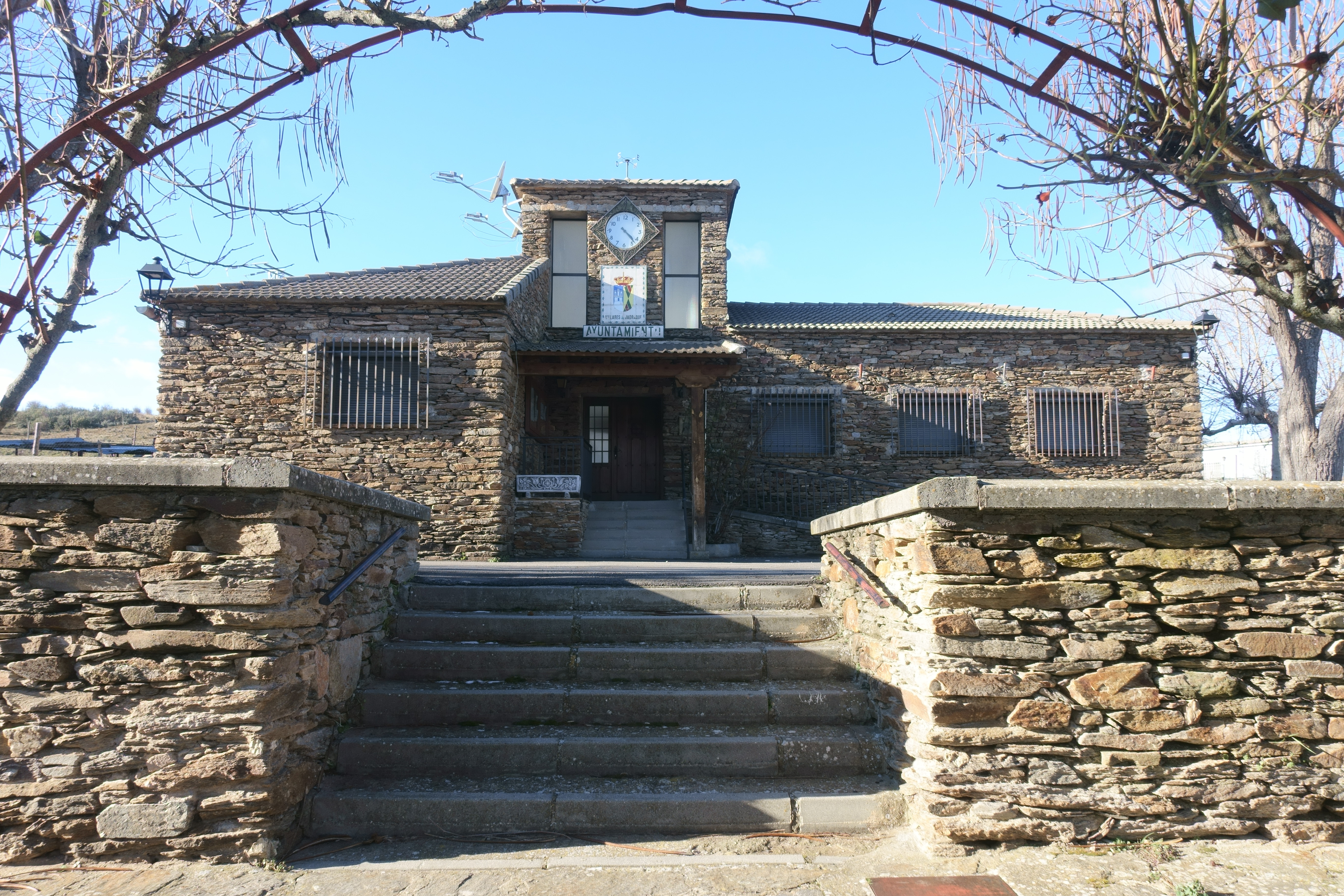
- Town hall

- Coat of arms

- Location within Province of Guadalajara Location within Castilla-La Mancha Location within Spain
- Coordinates: 41°06′10″N 3°01′28″W
- Country: Spain
- Autonomous community: Castile-La Mancha
- Province: Guadalajara
- Municipality: Villares de Jadraque

Area
  - Total: 17 km^{2} (6.6 sq mi)

Population (2025-01-01)
  - Total: 39
  - Density: 2.3/km^{2} (5.9/sq mi)
- Time zone: UTC+1 (CET)
  - Summer (DST): UTC+2 (CEST)

Villares de Jadraque is a municipality located in the province of Guadalajara, Castile-La Mancha, Spain. According to the 2004 census (INE), the municipality has a population of 55 inhabitants.
