= Villares de Yeltes =

- Municipality
- Coat of arms

- Location in Salamanca
- Coordinates: 40°52′51″N 6°25′13″W
- Country: Spain
- Autonomous community: Castile and León
- Province: Salamanca
- Comarca: Vitigudino
- Subcomarca: Tierra de Vitigudino

Government
  - Mayor: Manuel José Hernández Calzada (People's Party)

Area
  - Total: 41 km^{2} (16 sq mi)
- Elevation: 725 m (2,379 ft)

Population (2025-01-01)
  - Total: 102
  - Density: 2.5/km^{2} (6.4/sq mi)
- Time zone: UTC+1 (CET)
  - Summer (DST): UTC+2 (CEST)
- Postal code: 37267

Villares de Yeltes is a municipality located in the province of Salamanca, Castile and León, Spain. As of 2016 the municipality has a population of 128 inhabitants.
