= San Felices de los Gallegos =

- Municipality
- Flag Coat of arms

- Location in Salamanca
- Coordinates: 40°51′02″N 6°42′38″W
- Country: Spain
- Autonomous community: Castile and León
- Province: Salamanca
- Comarca: El Abadengo

Government
  - Mayor: Francisco de la Cruz Suarez (People's Party)

Area
  - Total: 81 km^{2} (31 sq mi)
- Elevation: 667 m (2,188 ft)

Population (2025-01-01)
  - Total: 355
  - Density: 4.4/km^{2} (11/sq mi)
- Time zone: UTC+1 (CET)
  - Summer (DST): UTC+2 (CEST)
- Postal code: 37270

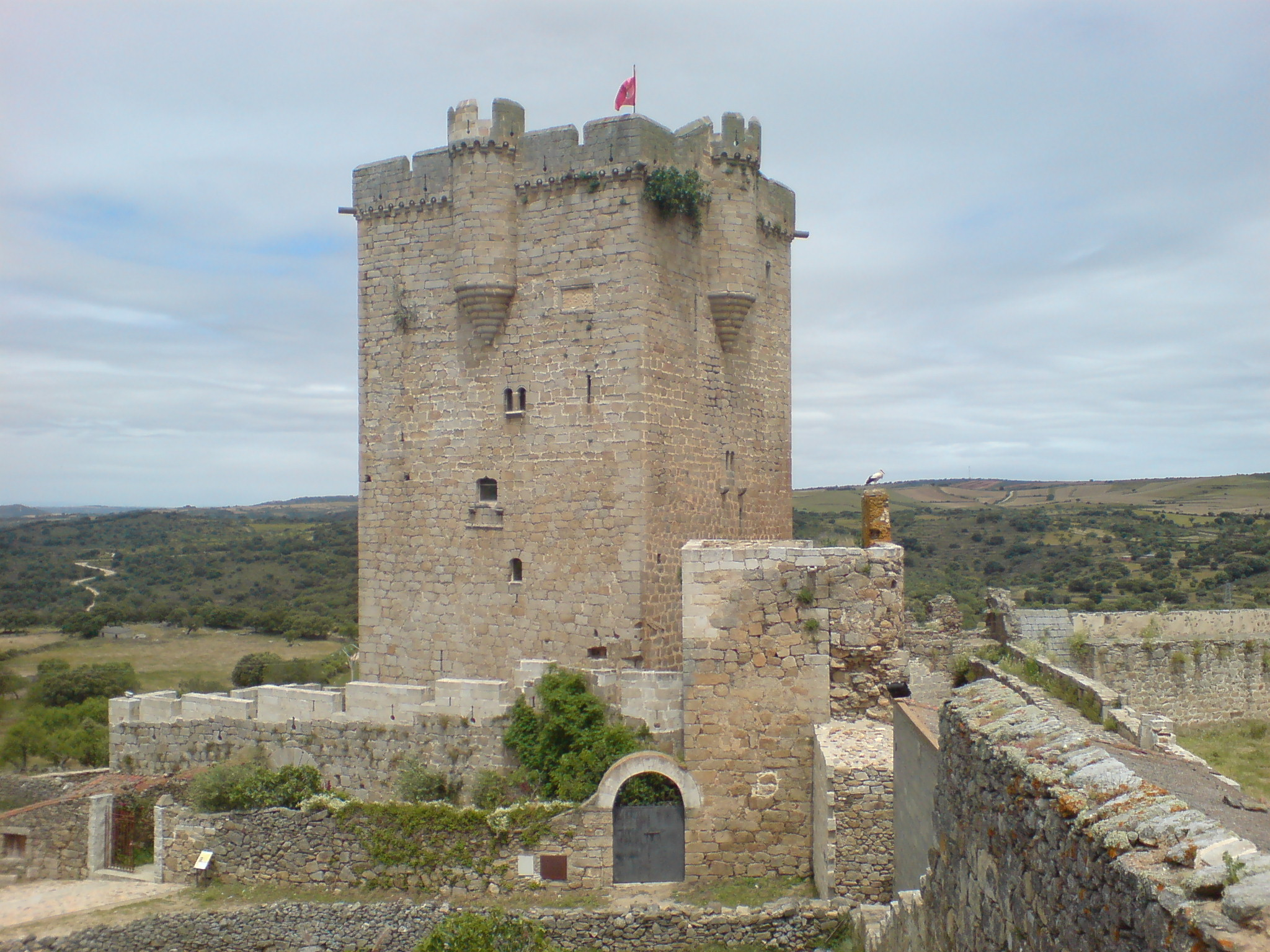
Castillosanfelices

San Felices de los Gallegos is a village and large municipality in the province of Salamanca, western Spain, part of the autonomous community of Castile and León. It is located 102 kilometers from the provincial capital city of Salamanca and has a population of 442 people, with a 2017 Wolfram Alpha estimate placing it at 427. It is situated within the Arribes del Duero Natural Park.

== History ==
As a result of the Treaty of Alcañices in 1297 the village became part of the Kingdom of Portugal, with the name of São Felix de Galegos, along with other Spanish towns: Hermisende (Ermesende in Portuguese), Salvaterra de Miño (Salvaterra do Minho), Olivenza (Olivença; including the current municipality of Táliga). The Portuguese held San Felices de los Gallegos until 1327 and occupied it briefly c. 1370 and again c. 1476.

== Geography ==
The municipality covers an area of 81 km^{2}. It lies 667 meters above sea level and the postal code is 37270.

== See also ==
List of municipalities in Salamanca
