= Ahigal =

Municipality in Cáceres, Spain

- Municipality
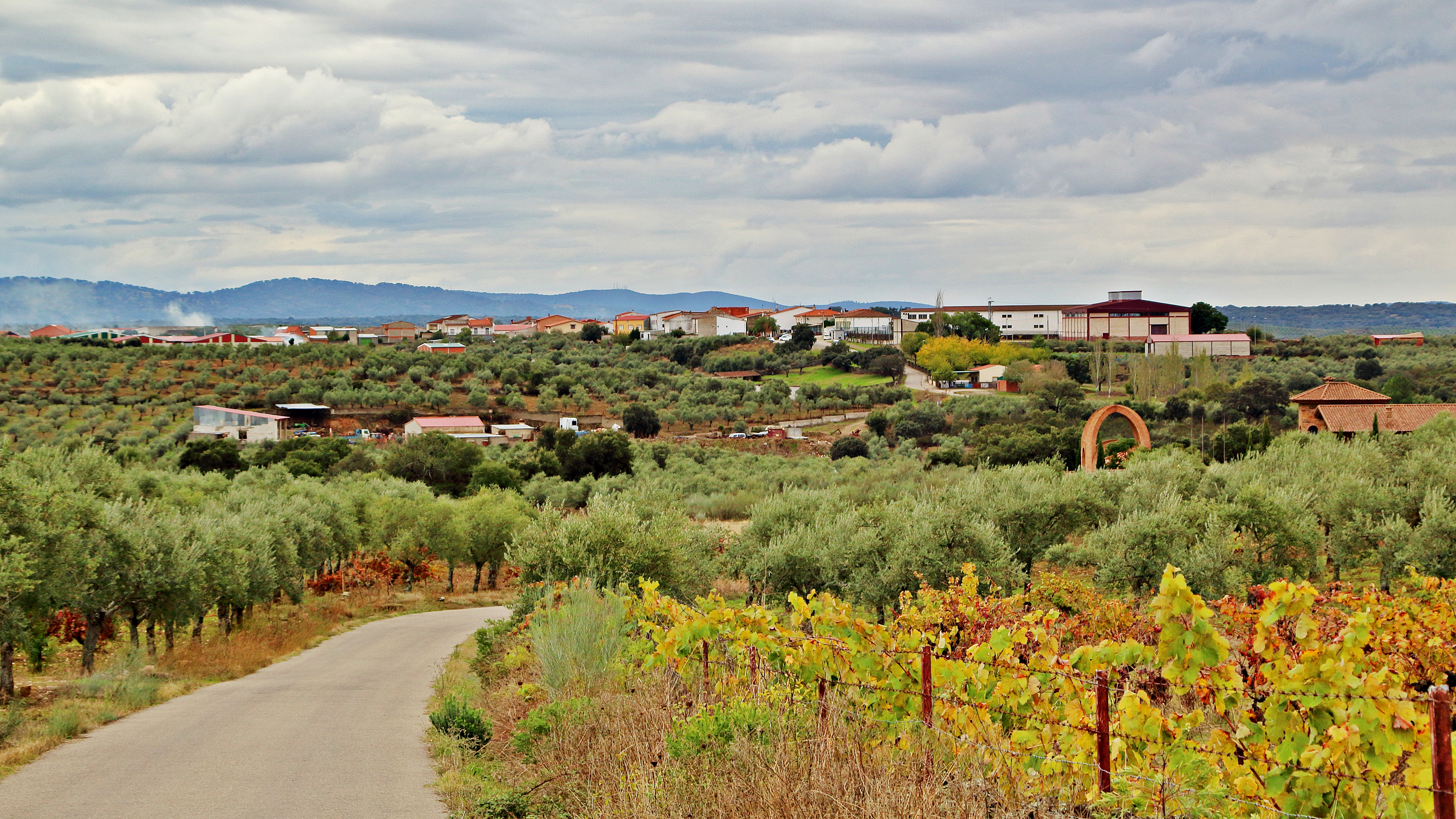

- Coat of arms

- Location of Ahigal in the Cáceres province.
- Coordinates: 40°11′N 6°11′W
- Country: ESP
- Province: Cáceres
- Autonomous communities of Spain: Extremadura
- Region: Tierras de Granadilla

Government
  - Mayor: Luis Fernando García Nicolás

Area
  - Total: 52.07 km^{2} (20.10 sq mi)
- Elevation: 391 m (1,283 ft)

Population (2025-01-01)
  - Total: 1,340
- Postal code: 10650
- Website: www.ahigal.es/

Ahigal is a municipality in the province of Cáceres and autonomous community of Extremadura, Spain. The municipality covers an area of 52.07 square kilometres (20.10 sq mi) and as of 2011 had a population of 1,435 people.

== Toponym ==
The origin of the series of place names "Ahigal" is a place name created from a plant. Figal is used as a surname in Asturias: the figal is the fig tree; many variations still exist such as La Figar, La Figal or Figares in Asturian place names. Like in Latin, the feminine gender of the tree name is maintained.

== Geographical limits ==
Ahigal is bordered by:

- Cerezo to the north;
- Guijo de Granadilla to the east;
- Oliva de Plasencia to the south-east;
- Valdeobispo to the south-west;
- Santibáñez el Bajo to the west.

== History ==
At the fall of the old regime the area was formed into a constitutional municipality in the Extremadura region, judicial district of Granadilla, then known as Aigal, which, in the census of 1842, had 250 homes and 1370 residents

== See also ==
- List of municipalities in Cáceres
