= Bogajo =

- Municipality
- Coat of arms

- Location in Salamanca

- Location in Spain
- Coordinates: 40°54′27″N 6°31′47″W
- Country: Spain
- Autonomous community: Castile and León
- Province: Salamanca
- Comarca: El Abadengo

Government
  - Mayor: Javier Castro Rodríguez (People's Party)

Area
  - Total: 33 km^{2} (13 sq mi)
- Elevation: 711 m (2,333 ft)

Population (2025-01-01)
  - Total: 124
  - Density: 3.8/km^{2} (9.7/sq mi)
- Time zone: UTC+1 (CET)
  - Summer (DST): UTC+2 (CEST)
- Postal code: 37291

Bogajo is a village and municipality in the province of Salamanca, western Spain, part of the autonomous community of Castile-Leon. It is 90 kilometres (56 mi) from the provincial capital city of Salamanca and has a population of 141 people.

It lies 711 metres (2,333 ft) above sea level and the postal code is 37249.
