= Villares del Saz =

Villares del Saz, Spain
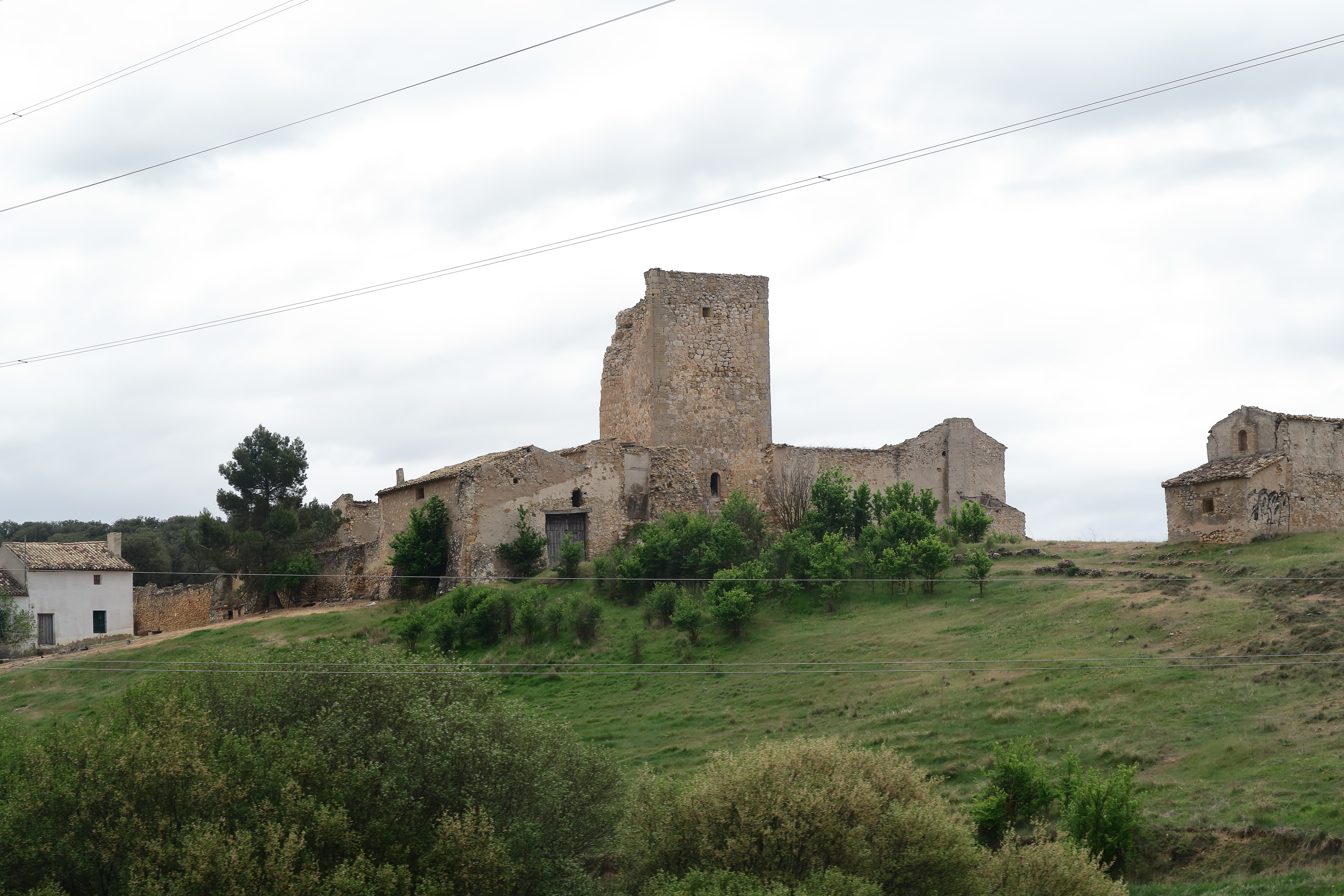
- Villares del Sanz, Torre del Monje, desde N-III

- Location within Spain Location within Castilla-La Mancha
- Coordinates: 39°51′N 2°30′W
- Country: Spain
- Autonomous community: Castile-La Mancha
- Province: Cuenca
- Municipality: Villares del Saz

Area
  - Total: 70.2 km^{2} (27.1 sq mi)
- Elevation: 851 m (2,792 ft)

Population (2025-01-01)
  - Total: 499
  - Density: 7.11/km^{2} (18.4/sq mi)
- Time zone: UTC+1 (CET)
  - Summer (DST): UTC+2 (CEST)

Villares del Saz is a municipality located in the province of Cuenca, Castile-La Mancha, Spain. According to the 2004 census (INE), the municipality had a population of 639 inhabitants.
