= Villa Vieja =

Coordinates: 31°16′S 62°42′W

- Municipality and village
- Interactive map of Villa Vieja
- Country: Argentina
- Province: Santiago del Estero
- Time zone: UTC−3 (ART)

Villa Vieja is a municipality and village in Santiago del Estero in Argentina.
