= Vitigudino =

- Municipality
- Flag Coat of arms

- Location in Salamanca
- Coordinates: 41°0′36″N 6°26′0″W
- Country: Spain
- Autonomous community: Castile and León
- Province: Salamanca
- Comarca: Vitigudino
- Subcomarca: Tierra de Vitigudino

Government
  - Mayor: Germán Vicente Sánchez (PSOE)

Area
  - Total: 52.33 km^{2} (20.20 sq mi)
- Elevation: 769 m (2,523 ft)

Population (2025-01-01)
  - Total: 2,344
  - Density: 44.79/km^{2} (116.0/sq mi)
- Time zone: UTC+1 (CET)
  - Summer (DST): UTC+2 (CEST)
- Postal code: 37210

Vitigudino is a village and municipality in the province of Salamanca, western Spain, part of the autonomous community of Castile and Leon. It is located 67 kilometers from the provincial capital city of Salamanca and has a population of 2.700 people. The municipality is made up of two entities: Majuges at 3 km and Vitigudino, which is the head. In addition, the region has 56 municipalities.

== Geography ==
The municipality covers an area of 52 km². It lies 769 meters above sea level and the postal code is 37210.

== Culture ==
Festivals

There are several festivals in this town, but the most important are: "Los Corpus" and "Ferias".

Los Corpus

These festivities begin on Wednesday, with an incipient "chupinazo" in the Plaza de España, followed at midnight by a capea-verbena that takes place in the bullring. The main day that gives rise to the festivities is the traditional Corpus Thursday, in which a Solemn Mass is celebrated with a subsequent procession with the Blessed Sacrament under a canopy through the main streets of the municipality.

The streets are adorned with thyme and altars in which the blessing with the monstrance is prayed and imparted, while the Blessed Jesus is incense and flower petals are thrown. In the afternoon there is a costume contest, in which the People take the center of town until, at night, running with bulls through the streets takes place.

Friday and Saturday they have a very similar program, traditional running of the bulls at noon (also with carts for children), cape in the afternoon in the bullring and dance in the Plaza de España at night, all accompanied by brass bands, the boot wine, good food and the colorful atmosphere provided by the many friends' clubs. It is noteworthy that some years (although less and less) in the evening capeas the traditional "charlotada" is performed in which a peña or group of friends dressed up with a specific theme and with all the possible props enters the bullring where then they take out a heifer for everyone to enjoy. On Sunday the religious festival is repeated, in communion with the whole Church, in addition to a confinement that puts an end to all celebrations.

Ferias

On August 15, the dedication of the Virgen del Socorro, whose image is venerated in a hermitage on a high part of the town, is especially celebrated on August 15. Previously, the image has been taken to the parish church where the Novena will be celebrated (9 days of preparation) and on the day of the feast, solemn Mass is celebrated and subsequent procession to the hermitage. Numerous women and girls accompany the Virgin with the traditional charro costume or with a mantilla. Already in the hermitage a floral offering is made. Also famous are the colorful parade of floats that same day 15 at night, and the immemorial cattle market that takes place on the 16th. In addition, on those days some bullfighting is usually celebrated, as well as festivals.

== See also ==
List of municipalities in Salamanca
