= Barruecopardo mine =

Tungsten mine in Spain

- Location in Spain
- Location: Barruecopardo, Salamanca, Spain; 41°02′55″N 6°40′00″W
- Products: Tungsten
- Company: Saloro SLU

The Barruecopardo mine is a large open pit mine located in the western part of Spain in Province of Salamanca. Barruecopardo represents one of the largest tungsten reserves in Spain having estimated reserves of 10.9 million tonnes of ore grading 0.45% tungsten.

The mine closed in the early 1980s. Saloro SLU redeveloped the site and production recommenced in early 2019.
