= Bañobárez =

- Municipality
- Flag Coat of arms

- Location in Salamanca

- Location in Spain
- Coordinates: 40°51′4″N 6°36′46″W
- Country: Spain
- Autonomous community: Castile and León
- Province: Salamanca
- Comarca: El Abadengo

Government
  - Mayor: José María Regalado García (People's Party)

Area
  - Total: 50 km^{2} (19 sq mi)
- Elevation: 743 m (2,438 ft)

Population (2025-01-01)
  - Total: 277
  - Density: 5.5/km^{2} (14/sq mi)
- Time zone: UTC+1 (CET)
  - Summer (DST): UTC+2 (CEST)
- Postal code: 37271

Bañobárez is a village and municipality in the province of Salamanca, western Spain, part of the autonomous community of Castile-Leon. It is located 92 kilometres (57 mi) from the city of Salamanca and has a population of 382 people. The municipality has an area of 50 km^{2} (19 sq mi). The village lies 743 metres (2,438 ft) above sea level.
