= Cerezal de Peñahorcada =

- Municipality
- Coat of arms

- Location in Salamanca

- Location in Spain
- Coordinates: 41°07′50″N 6°39′16″W
- Country: Spain
- Autonomous community: Castile and León
- Province: Salamanca
- Comarca: Vitigudino
- Subcomarca: La Ramajería

Government
  - Mayor: Jesús Javier Calvo Rodríguez (People's Party)

Area
  - Total: 18 km^{2} (6.9 sq mi)
- Elevation: 702 m (2,303 ft)

Population (2025-01-01)
  - Total: 64
  - Density: 3.6/km^{2} (9.2/sq mi)
- Time zone: UTC+1 (CET)
  - Summer (DST): UTC+2 (CEST)
- Postal code: 37254

Cerezal de Peñahorcada is a village and municipality in the province of Salamanca, western Spain, part of the autonomous community of Castile and León. It is 93 kilometres (58 mi) from the provincial capital city of Salamanca and has a population of 80 people. The municipality covers an area of 18 km^{2} (6.9 sq mi). It lies 702 metres (2,303 ft) above sea level and the post code is 37254.
