= La Redonda =

- Municipality
- Location in Salamanca
- Coordinates: 40°54′32″N 6°44′57″W
- Country: Spain
- Autonomous community: Castile and León
- Province: Salamanca
- Comarca: El Abadengo

Government
  - Mayor: Ángel Sánchez (PSOE)

Area
  - Total: 17 km^{2} (6.6 sq mi)
- Elevation: 668 m (2,192 ft)

Population (2025-01-01)
  - Total: 61
  - Density: 3.6/km^{2} (9.3/sq mi)
- Time zone: UTC+1 (CET)
  - Summer (DST): UTC+2 (CEST)
- Postal code: 37247

La Redonda is a municipality located in the province of Salamanca, Castile and León, Spain. As of 2016 the municipality has a population of 94 inhabitants.
