= Olmedo de Camaces =

- Municipality
- Coat of arms

- Location in Salamanca
- Coordinates: 40°52′45″N 6°37′25″W
- Country: Spain
- Autonomous community: Castile and León
- Province: Salamanca
- Comarca: El Abadengo

Government
  - Mayor: Jesús Martín Vicente (People's Party)

Area
  - Total: 91 km^{2} (35 sq mi)
- Elevation: 713 m (2,339 ft)

Population (2025-01-01)
  - Total: 87
  - Density: 0.96/km^{2} (2.5/sq mi)
- Time zone: UTC+1 (CET)
  - Summer (DST): UTC+2 (CEST)
- Postal code: 37292

Olmedo de Camaces is a village and large municipality in the province of Salamanca, western Spain, part of the autonomous community of Castile-Leon. It is located 95 kilometres (59 mi) from the provincial capital city of Salamanca and has a population of 111 people.

== Basic History ==
Camaces Olmedo, cut across the river which gives its name, honors their patron Saint, George (23 April), with bullfights, as a local tradition.

The township is bordered on the north by a quartzite hill range, bordering on Cerralbo and the former desert of Fuenlabrada.

The Picon de Olmedo, at a height of 797 metres (2,615 ft) and the Cerro de San Jorge, at a height of 825 metres (2,707 ft), are among the highest altitudes of the region.

At the base-line of these hills lie the landscapes of the 'peneplain' and 'charro' field. The meadow is oak-lined -and cattle herds of 'Morucha' graze on this meadow.

== Geography ==
The municipality covers an area of 91 km^{2} (35 sq mi). It lies 713 metres (2,339 ft) above sea level and the postal code is 37292.

== See also ==
- List of municipalities in Salamanca
