= Fuenteliante =

- Municipality
- Location in Salamanca
- Coordinates: 40°52′26″N 6°34′23″W
- Country: Spain
- Autonomous community: Castile and León
- Province: Salamanca
- Comarca: El Abadengo

Government
  - Mayor: Manuel Amador del Molino Velasco (People's Party)

Area
  - Total: 50 km^{2} (19 sq mi)
- Elevation: 723 m (2,372 ft)

Population (2025-01-01)
  - Total: 80
  - Density: 1.6/km^{2} (4.1/sq mi)
- Time zone: UTC+1 (CET)
  - Summer (DST): UTC+2 (CEST)
- Postal code: 37291

Fuenteliante is a village and municipality in the province of Salamanca, western Spain, part of the autonomous community of Castile-Leon. It is located 87 kilometres (54 mi) from the provincial capital city of Salamanca and has a population of 126 people.

== Geography ==
The municipality covers an area of 50 km^{2} (19 sq mi). It lies 723 metres (2,372 ft) above sea level and the postal code is 37272.

== See also ==
- List of municipalities in Salamanca
