= Hinojosa de Duero =

- Municipality
- Coat of arms

- Location in Salamanca
- Coordinates: 40°59′10″N 6°47′46″W
- Country: Spain
- Autonomous community: Castile and León
- Province: Salamanca
- Comarca: El Abadengo

Government
  - Mayor: José Francisco Bautista Méndez (PSOE)

Area
  - Total: 93 km^{2} (36 sq mi)
- Elevation: 601 m (1,972 ft)

Population (2025-01-01)
  - Total: 562
  - Density: 6.0/km^{2} (16/sq mi)
- Time zone: UTC+1 (CET)
  - Summer (DST): UTC+2 (CEST)
- Postal code: 37230

Hinojosa de Duero is a village and large municipality in the province of Salamanca, western Spain, part of the autonomous community of Castile-Leon. It is located 105 kilometres (65 mi) from the provincial capital city of Salamanca and has a population of 699 people.

== Geography ==
The municipality covers an area of 93 km^{2} (36 sq mi). It lies 601 metres (1,972 ft) above sea level.

== Economy ==
The basis of the economy is agriculture. The village is also known for its local cheese ("queso de Hinojosa"), which is an aged cheese made with sheep milk, similar to Manchego.

== Culture ==
The city celebrates the San Juan festival on 24 June.

== See also ==
- List of municipalities in Salamanca
