= Sobradillo, Salamanca =

Sobradillo
- Municipality
- Coat of arms

- Location in Salamanca
- Coordinates: 40°55′1″N 6°47′58″W
- Country: Spain
- Autonomous community: Castile and León
- Province: Salamanca
- Comarca: El Abadengo

Government
  - Mayor: José María González González (People's Party)

Area
  - Total: 54 km^{2} (21 sq mi)
- Elevation: 651 m (2,136 ft)

Population (2025-01-01)
  - Total: 170
  - Density: 3.1/km^{2} (8.2/sq mi)
- Time zone: UTC+1 (CET)
  - Summer (DST): UTC+2 (CEST)
- Postal code: 37246

Sobradillo is a municipality located in the province of Salamanca, Castile and León, Spain. As of 2016, the municipality has a population of 242 inhabitants.
