= Ahigal de Villarino =

- Municipality
- Location in Salamanca

- Location in Spain
- Coordinates: 41°09′30″N 6°22′52″W
- Country: Spain
- Autonomous community: Castile and León
- Province: Salamanca
- Comarca: Vitigudino
- Subcomarca: La Ramajería

Government
  - Mayor: Ángel Herrero Rodríguez (People's Party)

Area
  - Total: 24.11 km^{2} (9.31 sq mi)
- Elevation: 766 m (2,513 ft)

Population (2025-01-01)
  - Total: 30
  - Density: 1.2/km^{2} (3.2/sq mi)
- Time zone: UTC+1 (CET)
  - Summer (DST): UTC+2 (CEST)
- Postal code: 37173

Ahigal de Villarino is a village and municipality in the province of Salamanca, western Spain, part of the autonomous community of Castile and León.
