= Villavieja de Yeltes =

- Municipality
- Flag Coat of arms

- Location in Salamanca
- Coordinates: 40°52′1″N 6°28′0″W
- Country: Spain
- Autonomous community: Castile and León
- Province: Salamanca
- Comarca: El Abadengo

Government
  - Mayor: Jorge Rodríguez Martín (PSOE)

Area
  - Total: 50.84 km^{2} (19.63 sq mi)
- Elevation: 740 m (2,430 ft)

Population (2025-01-01)
  - Total: 676
  - Density: 13.3/km^{2} (34.4/sq mi)
- Time zone: UTC+1 (CET)
  - Summer (DST): UTC+2 (CEST)
- Postal code: 37260

Villavieja de Yeltes is a municipality in Salamanca, Castile and León, Spain.

== Geography ==
The municipality is in the western portion of Castile and León, about 290 km from Madrid, at 738 meters above sea level. Its northern and eastern borders are formed by the Yeltes river, and its entire area is in the river's drainage basin. Its highest point is 828 meters above sea level, in La Berzosa.

== History ==
The shores of the Yeltes river have been inhabited since prehistoric times, as indicated by artifacts found there. Megalithic-stage structures were scattered throughout the area, and many remains have been discovered from the medieval period.

== Demographics ==
The population has fallen inexorably since 2001.

Year	2001	2002	2003	2004	2005	2006	2007
Population	1119	1113	1082	1029	1041	1022	989
Men	558	553	541	514	518	511	498
Women	561	560	541	515	523	511	491
