= Bermellar =

- Municipality
- Coat of arms

- Location in Salamanca

- Location in Spain
- Coordinates: 40°59′55″N 6°40′16″W
- Country: Spain
- Autonomous community: Castile and León
- Province: Salamanca
- Comarca: El Abadengo

Government
  - Mayor: Manuel José Sánchez Francia (PSOE)

Area
  - Total: 28 km^{2} (11 sq mi)
- Elevation: 639 m (2,096 ft)

Population (2025-01-01)
  - Total: 129
  - Density: 4.6/km^{2} (12/sq mi)
- Time zone: UTC+1 (CET)
  - Summer (DST): UTC+2 (CEST)
- Postal code: 37291

Bermellar is a village and municipality in the province of Salamanca, Spain. It is 90 km (56 mi) from the provincial capital city of Salamanca and has a population of 134 people.

It predates Celtic times.

Bermellar lies 639 metres (2,096 ft) above sea level and the post code is 37249.
