= Tarazona (disambiguation) =

Tarazona is a town and municipality in Aragon, Spain.

Tarazona may also refer to:

== Places in Spain ==
- Tarazona y el Moncayo, a comarca in Aragon
- Tarazona de Guareña, a municipality in Castile and León
- Tarazona de la Mancha, a municipality in Castile-La Mancha

== Sports ==
- SD Tarazona, a football team in Tarazona, Spain
- Atlético Tarazona, a football team in Tarazona de la Mancha, Spain, 1979–2011

== People ==
- Carlos Tarazona (born 1965), Venezuelan long-distance runner
- Daniela Tarazona (born 1975), Mexican writer and journalist
- Eloy Tarazona (1880–1953), Venezuelan military figure
- Juan Rovira Tarazona (1930–1990), Spanish politician
- Santiago Tarazona (born 1996), Argentine field hockey player
