= Villaflores =

Villaflores may refer to:

- Villaflores, Chiapas, a municipality in the state of Chiapas, Mexico
- Villaflores, Salamanca, a municipality in the province of Salamanca, Castile and León, Spain
- Villaflores, a hamlet in the municipality of Guadalajara, Spain
- Villaflores College, school in Tanjay City, Negros Oriental, Philippines
- Villaflores Integrated School, school in Cuyapo, Nueva Ecija, Philippines
