= Cantalapiedra =

- Municipality
- Coat of arms

- Location in Salamanca

- Location in Spain
- Coordinates: 41°07′N 5°11′W
- Country: Spain
- Autonomous community: Castile and León
- Province: Salamanca
- Comarca: Tierra de Cantalapiedra

Government
  - Mayor: Juana González (People's Party)

Area
  - Total: 25 km^{2} (9.7 sq mi)
- Elevation: 797 m (2,615 ft)

Population (2025-01-01)
  - Total: 884
  - Density: 35/km^{2} (92/sq mi)
- Time zone: UTC+1 (CET)
  - Summer (DST): UTC+2 (CEST)
- Postal code: 37630

Cantalapiedra is a village and municipality in the province of Salamanca, western Spain, part of the autonomous community of Castile and León. It is located 50 kilometres (31 mi) from the city of Salamanca and has a population of 1250 people. The municipality covers an area of 25 km^{2} (9.7 sq mi).

It is 50 km (31 mi) from Salamanca, the provincial capital. The region forms part of the Field of Peñaranda.

Cantalapiedra, which lies within the province of Salamanca (which itself is bordered by the Zamora, Valladolid and Ávila provinces, within the 71.15 square kilometres of the region) has a diameter of around 50 kilometres (31 mi) (from the centre of the town). Governed by the judicial system of Peñaranda, Cantalapiedra is a 'typical' town in Salamanca; in the middle of seamlessly endless plains of fertile wheat, and located between such historic states as the Old Kingdom of León and the Old Kingdom of Castile.

The first organization in Cantalapiedra was the church of Santa Maria of the Castle. The town is surrounded by plains to the north, northeast, northwest and south, grown there to 'frame' the town. Its historic past is reflected in local landmarks, like the street of Weavers, encased within a wall, which goes up to the old slaughter house and leads to the street of the hospital. The rest of the old enclosure symbolizes the tower of the Dean. Now one can stroll down the main streets, immersed in the cultural and economic growth which has occurred in the 20th and 21st centuries. The town is served by a railway line. Cantalapiedra is the antipode of Whitby, New Zealand.

The village lies 797 metres (2,615 ft) above sea level and the post code is 37630.

== Notable people ==
- Ángela María de la Concepción (1649-1690), Trinitarian nun, writer and mystic; founder, Monasterio de El Toboso y de las Monjas Trinitarias Recoletas

== See also ==
- List of municipalities in Salamanca
