= Eusebia Palomino Yenes =

Spanish nun, blessed (1899–1935)

Blessed Eusebia Palomino Yenes F.M.A.
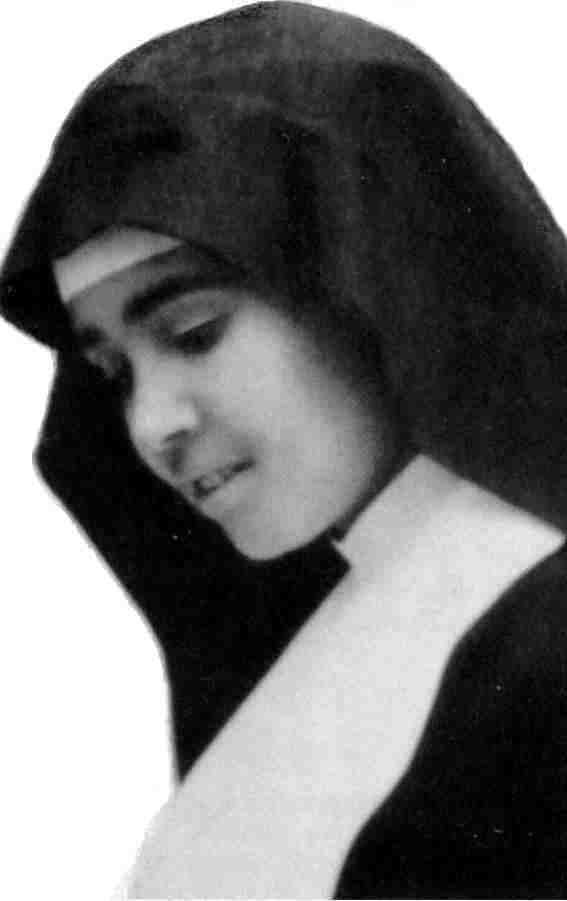
- Eusebia Palomino Yenes, c. 1930.

Religious
- Born: 15 December 1899; Cantalpino, Salamanca, Kingdom of Spain
- Died: 10 February 1935 (aged 35); Valverde del Camino, Huelva, Second Spanish Republic
- Venerated in: Roman Catholic Church
- Beatified: 25 April 2004, Saint Peter's Square, Vatican City by Pope John Paul II
- Feast: 9 February (Salesians); 10 February
- Attributes: Religious habit

Eusebia Palomino Yenes (15 December 1899 – 10 February 1935) was a Spanish Roman Catholic professed religious and a professed member of the Salesian Sisters of Don Bosco. Palomino worked as a domestic during her adolescence, having withdrawn from her education to support her parents. She later worked with the Salesian Sisters before beginning the process of becoming a member of that order in the 1920s. She continued many of the same duties afterward and became known for her devotion to the five wounds of Jesus Christ and to the Via Crucis.

Palomino's beatification cause commenced on 15 December 1981, and she was titled as a Servant of God. The ratification of a decree recognizing her life of heroic virtue allowed Pope John Paul II to name her Venerable on 17 December 1996. That same pope confirmed a miracle attributed to her intercession and beatified Palomino on 25 April 2004 in Saint Peter's Square.

== Life ==
Eusebia Palomino Yenes was born in Cantalpino on 15 December 1899 as the third of four children to Agustin Palomino and Juana Yenes de Villaflores; an older sister was Dolores. Her father worked as a seasonal farmhand and during winter - when there was no work - he would go to towns close to home to beg for food; she would go with him on these trips around 1909 and he would often teach her catechism. Palomino made her First Communion aged eight and dubbed this her first "encounter" with Jesus Christ. In 1906 she entered a girls school but withdrew to support her parents.

Palomino first worked as a domestic servant in a rich household before serving in an orphanage in 1911 alongside her older sister Dolores. Once a week she would go to the Sancti Spiritus school chapel that the Salesian Sisters of Don Bosco managed and she came to know them; the sisters asked if she would work for them and so she served as a maid and a cook the religious. School cleaning and collecting firewood also formed part of this job in addition to getting to know the students who came to admire her and seek her out for her sage advice.

But she fostered a secret desire: to join the religious but she did not ask for she feared she would be refused on the grounds of being a poor woman with a limited education; a visiting superior discussed this with her and told her she would be accepted soon. Her acceptance came when she was admitted as a postulant on 31 January 1921 and she would receive the order's religious habit on 5 May 1922. Palomino began her novitiate on 5 August 1922 in Barcelona and made her initial profession in August 1924 before being transferred to the Salesian house at Valverde del Camino. Her arrival saw the students mock her for her appearance and she remained indifferent to this as she tended to her domestic duties. The students came to see her spiritual learning and her piousness and were captivated with stories of the saints she would tell them as well as stories from the life of Giovanni Bosco. She made her solemn profession in 1930. Priests and religious came to her for advice on numerous occasions. The nun liked the so-called 'Marian servitude' of Louis Grignion de Montfort and spread devotion to the wounds of Jesus Christ as well as the Via Crucis.

In the thirties there was an air of anti-religious sentiment in the nation and she offered herself as a victim to God for the salvation of the state. In August 1932 she contracted an unknown illness that doctors were unable to diagnose; her limbs often would wind up and her mild asthma worsened and made her sufferings more. On 4 October 1934 she had a pale complexion and told her sisters to beg God to save Catalonia and to keep it safe.

Palomino died in 1935 and had predicted not long prior that the anti-religious sentiment would transcend to conflict - this happened not long after as the Spanish Civil War.

== Beatification ==
The beatification process commenced on 15 December 1981 after the Congregation for the Causes of Saints issued the official "nihil obstat" and titled her as a Servant of God; the diocesan process opened in the Diocese of Huelva and Bishop Rafael González Moralejo oversaw the diocesan process from 12 April 1982 until 15 September 1984. The C.C.S. validated this process in Rome on 20 December 1985 and received the Positio from postulation officials in 1990. Theologians approved the cause on 14 May 1996 as did the C.C.S. on 5 November 1996 which later allowed for Pope John Paul II to confirm her heroic virtue and name her as Venerable on 17 December 1996.

The miracle for beatification was investigated prior to C.C.S. validation on 5 February 1999; a medical board approved it on 22 November 2001 as did theologians on 30 May 2003 and the C.C.S. on 16 December 2003. John Paul II approved this miracle on 20 December 2003 and later beatified Palomino on 25 April 2004 in Saint Peter's Square.

The current postulator for this cause is the Salesian priest Pierluigi Cameroni.
