= Cantalpino =

- Municipality
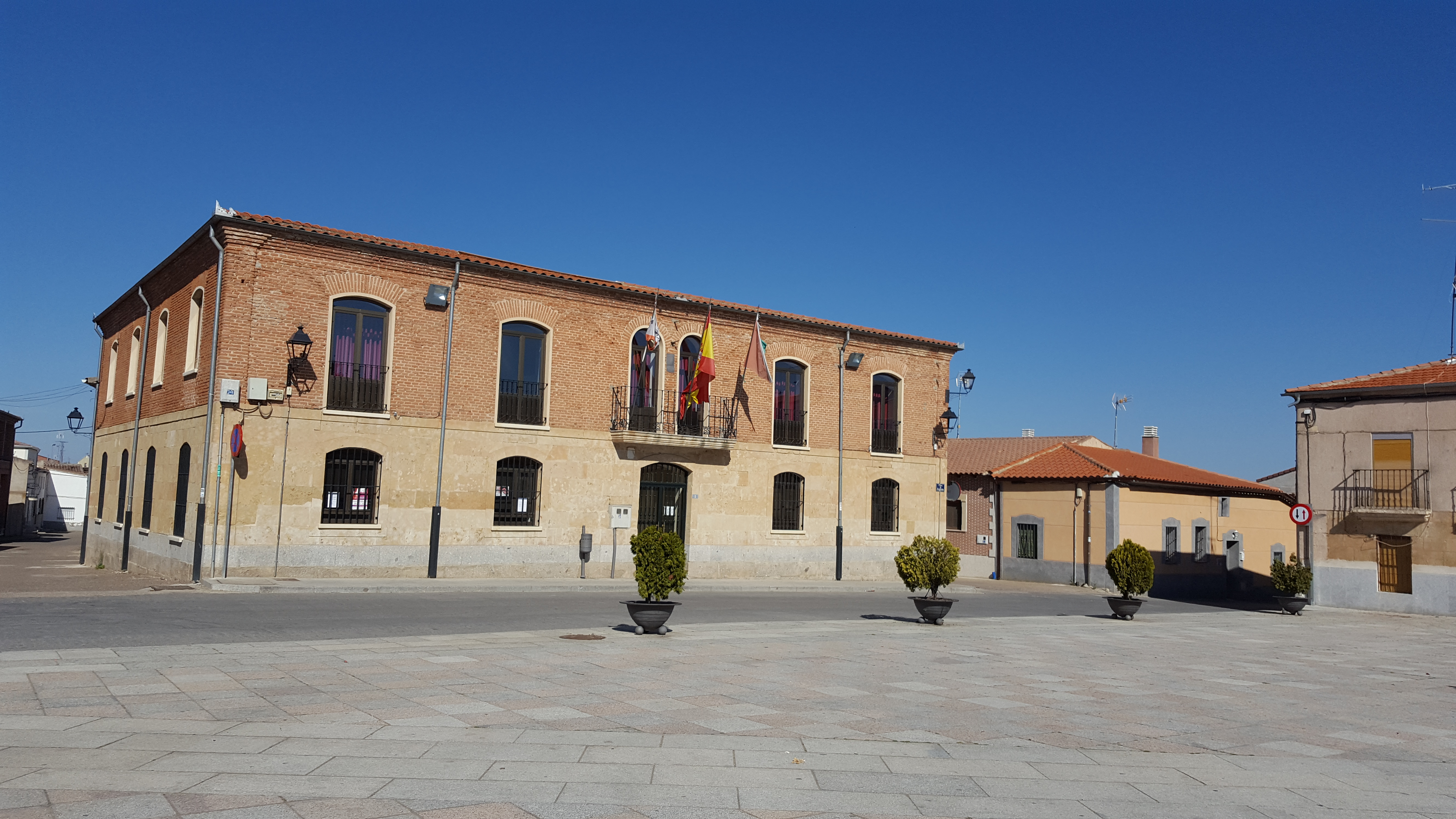
- Town hall

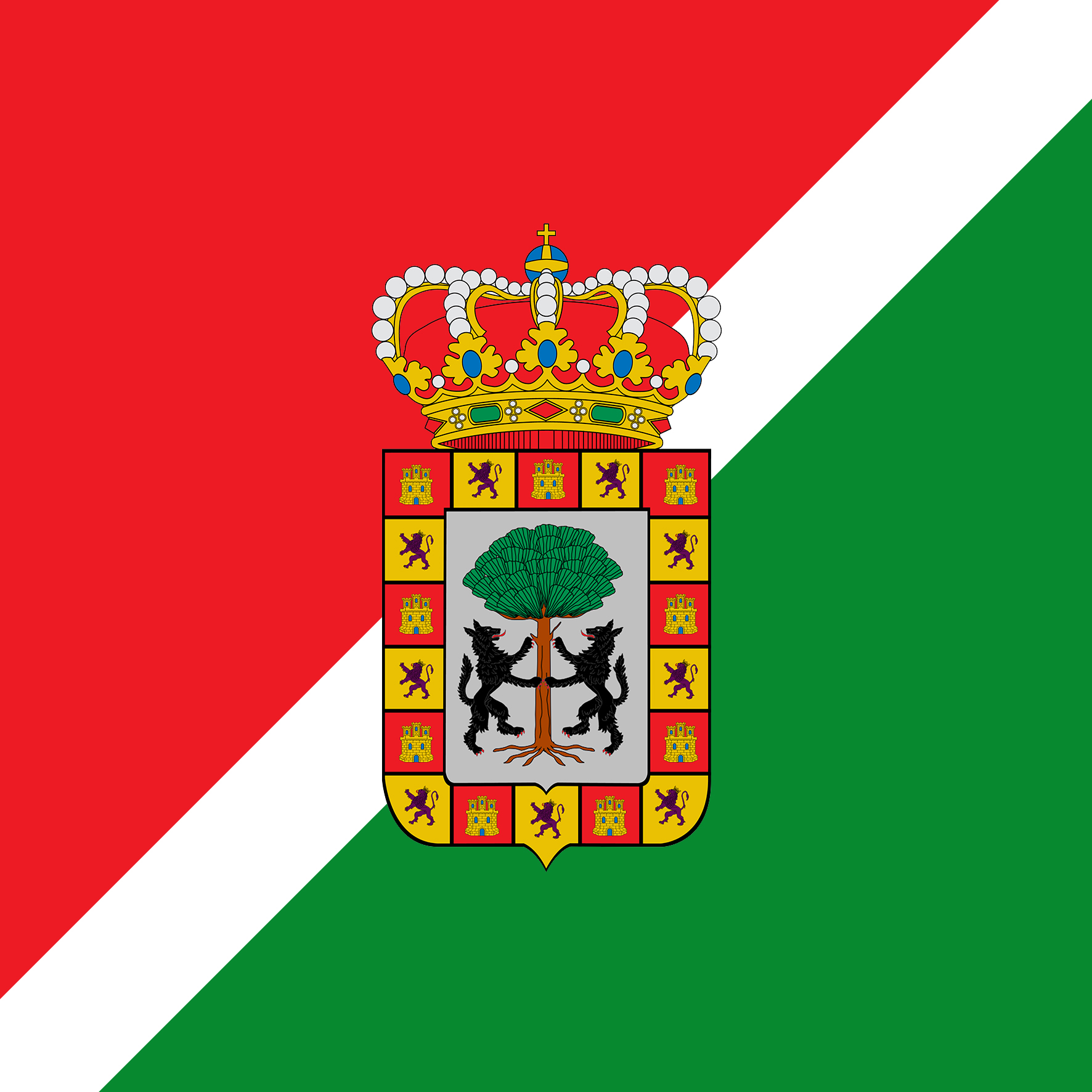
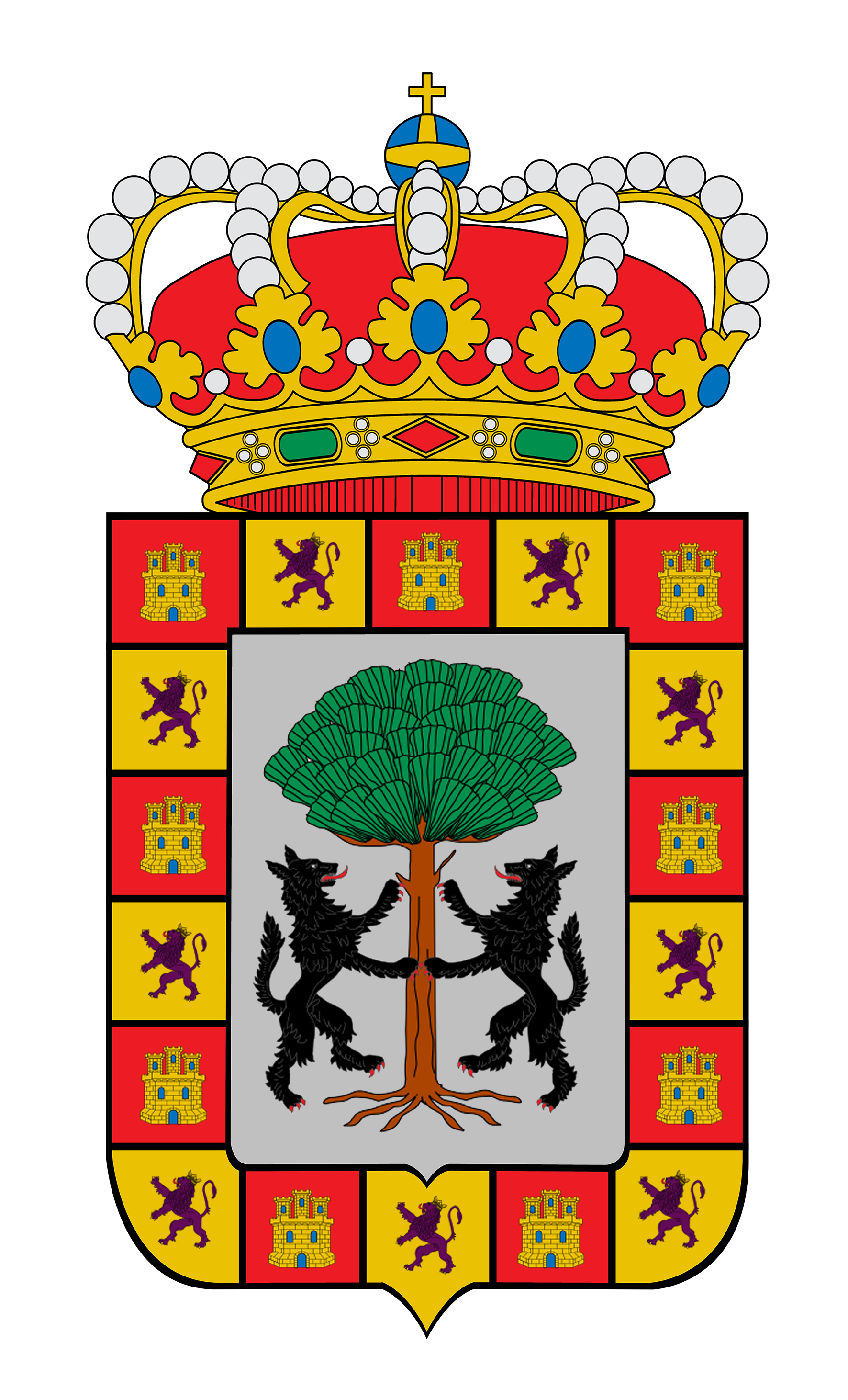
- Flag Coat of arms

- Location in Salamanca

- Location in Spain
- Coordinates: 41°03′N 5°20′W
- Country: Spain
- Autonomous community: Castilla y León
- Province: Salamanca
- Comarca: Tierra de Cantalapiedra

Government
  - Mayor: Javier Bolao Puente (People's Party)

Area
  - Total: 78 km^{2} (30 sq mi)
- Elevation: 809 m (2,654 ft)

Population (2025-01-01)
  - Total: 802
  - Density: 10/km^{2} (27/sq mi)
- Time zone: UTC+1 (CET)
  - Summer (DST): UTC+2 (CEST)
- Postal code: 37405

Cantalpino is a village and municipality in the province of Salamanca, western Spain, part of the autonomous community of Castile-Leon. It is located 30 kilometres (19 mi) from the city of Salamanca and as of 2016 has a population of 927 people. The municipality covers an area of 78.47 km^{2} (30.30 sq mi).

The village lies 809 metres (2,654 ft) above sea level.

The postal code is 37405.

== Notable people ==
On 15 December 1899, Eusebia Palomino Yenes, a nun of the Salesian Sisters of Don Bosco, was born here. In 2004 she was beatified.
