= Ángela María de la Concepción =

Spanish Trinitarian nun, mystical writer and reformer

Sor Ángela María de la Concepción
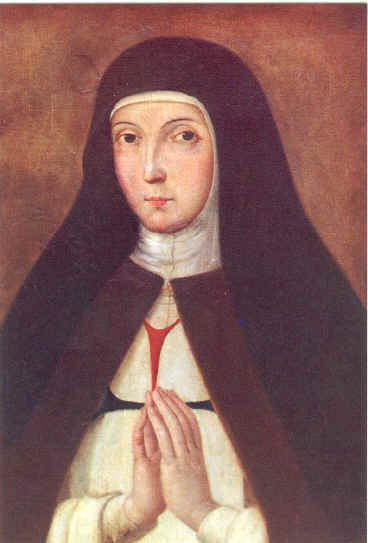

Personal life
- Born: March 1, 1649 Cantalapiedra, Spain
- Died: April 19, 1690 (aged 41) El Toboso, Spain
- Notable work: Vida de la venerable madre sor Angela Maria de la Concepcion: reformadora de la regla primitiva del órden de la Santísima Trinidad y fundadora del Convento de Religiosas Trinitarias de la villa del Toboso
- Known for: Order founder

Religious life
- Religion: Roman Catholic
- Denomination: Trinitarias contemplativas
- Order: Monasterio de las trinitarias de El Toboso

Ángela María de la Concepción (Cantalapiedra, March 1, 1649 - El Toboso, April 19, 1690) was a Spanish Trinitarian nun, mystical writer, and reformer. She was the founder of the Monasterio de las trinitarias de El Toboso and of the Trinitarias contemplativas.

== Early life ==
Ángela María was born in the Salamanca town of Cantalapiedra on March 1, 1649, the daughter of Alonso Tabares and María Martínez Santo. At thirteen years of age, after a general confession, she made a vow of virginity and to become a religious. She fulfilled this when she turned 21, entering the Convento de Las Descalzas Reales in Valladolid, but had to withdraw due to an unspecified disease.

When Ángela María recovered from her illness, for unknown reasons, she did not return to the monastery of the Carmelites, but rather, she entered the Convent of the Trinitarian Sisters of Medina del Campo, Valladolid. During her novitiate, she endeavored to fulfill the requirements demanded by the religious order: progress in humility, in the spirit of prayer, in obedience, and in mortification.

== Founder ==
After nine years of being professed, Ángela María felt the call from God to start the Trinitarian religious community. This was in the time of the reforms of the religious orders in Spain, marked by the postulants of the Council of Trent, which tried to live a life more in keeping with the spirit of the religious origins. Thus, Ángela María took charge as prioress of the establishment of the Monasterio de las trinitarias of El Toboso, one of the most important centers in La Mancha. Along with eleven other nuns, she wore the habit of recollection in the convent of the Trinitarian Recollects on May 20, 1680.

On June 10, 1681, the first Trinitarian Recollects professed their vows. It is there that Ángela María added the religious name of "La Concepción". Three years later, on February 22, 1685, Pope Innocent XI approved the Constitutions of the Trinitarian Recollection.

Ángela María was characterized by writing works of a religious and mystical nature, among which, in addition to the Constituciones (Constitutions), her Autobiografía (Autobiography) and Riego espiritual para las nuevas plantas, stand out, as well as numerous letters and some spiritual treatises, among these, the Tratado de las virtudes (Treatise on Virtues) and the Tratado de la oración mental (Treatise on mental prayer), which she left unfinished. All of her works are filled with the reforming nature of her time, influenced by the writings of Saint Teresa of Jesus, Saint John of the Cross, Saint Simón de Rojas, and Juan García López-Rico.

== Death ==
From July 1689, Ángela María remained bedridden, slowly weakening. On April 9, 1690, she asked for the anointing of the sick, and ten days later, she died.

A cause for her beatification was opened on July 29, 1912, and she was formally declared Servant of God.

== Selected works ==
- Angela Maria de la Concepcion (sor) (1854). Vida de la venerable madre sor Angela Maria de la Concepcion: reformadora de la regla primitiva del órden de la Santísima Trinidad y fundadora del Convento de Religiosas Trinitarias de la villa del Toboso (in Spanish). Imprenta de Vicente Fernandez.
