= Palaciosrubios =

- Municipality
- Coat of arms

- Location in Salamanca
- Coordinates: 41°03′05″N 5°11′40″W
- Country: Spain
- Autonomous community: Castile and León
- Province: Salamanca
- Comarca: Tierra de Cantalapiedra

Government
  - Alcalde: Victor Jiménez García (People's Party)

Area
  - Total: 36 km^{2} (14 sq mi)
- Elevation: 811 m (2,661 ft)

Population (2025-01-01)
  - Total: 283
  - Density: 7.9/km^{2} (20/sq mi)
- Time zone: UTC+1 (CET)
  - Summer (DST): UTC+2 (CEST)
- Climate: BSk

Palaciosrubios is a municipality located in the province of Salamanca, Castile and León, Spain. As of 2016 the municipality has a population of 382 inhabitants.
