= Poveda de las Cintas =

- Municipality
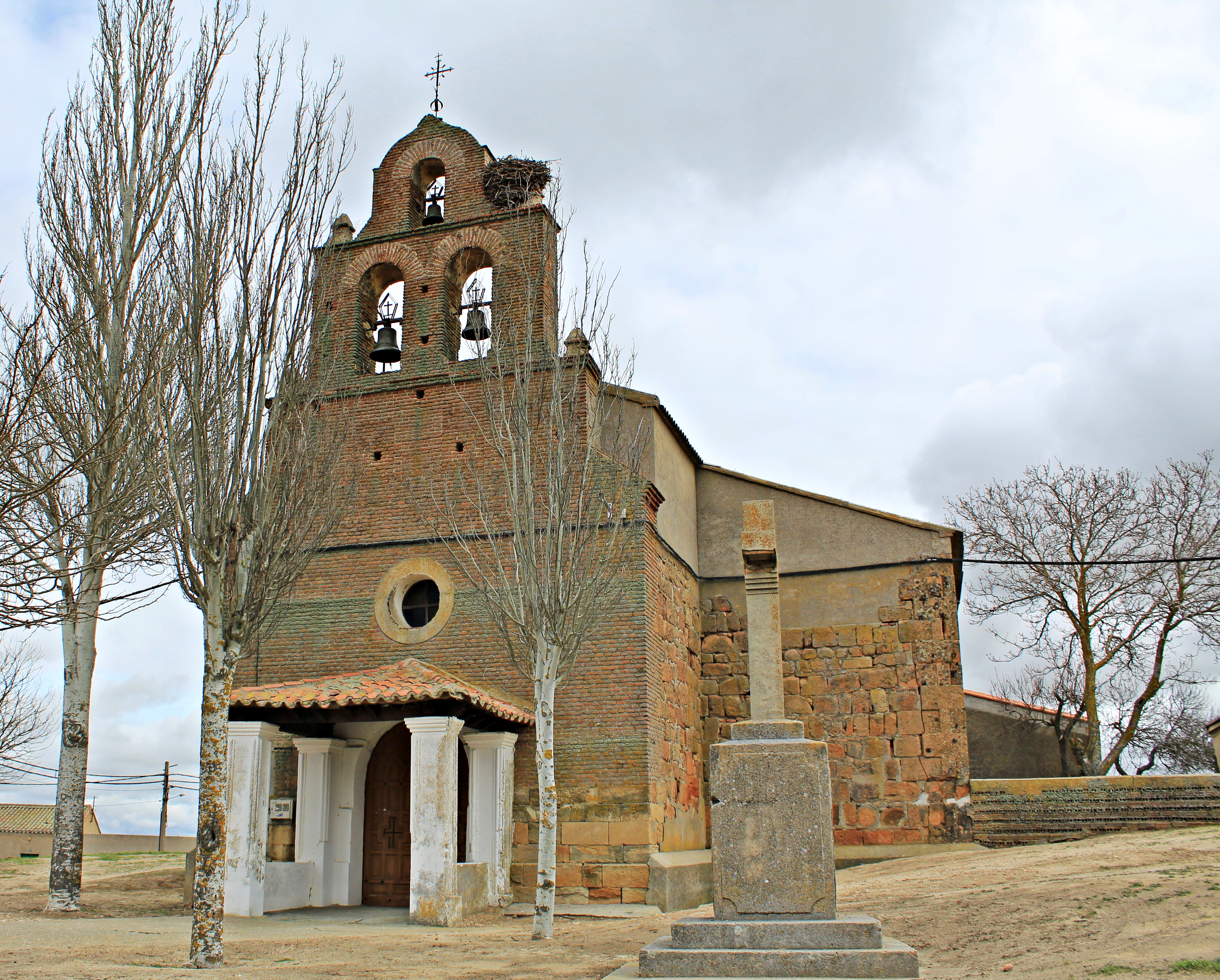

- Location in Salamanca
- Coordinates: 41°2′51″N 5°15′44″W
- Country: Spain
- Autonomous community: Castile and León
- Province: Salamanca
- Comarca: Tierra de Cantalapiedra

Government
  - Mayor: Ramón de Cossio Cruz (PSOE)

Area
  - Total: 24 km^{2} (9.3 sq mi)
- Elevation: 828 m (2,717 ft)

Population (2025-01-01)
  - Total: 197
  - Density: 8.2/km^{2} (21/sq mi)
- Time zone: UTC+1 (CET)
  - Summer (DST): UTC+2 (CEST)
- Postal code: 37406

Poveda de las Cintas is a municipality located in the province of Salamanca, Castile and León, Spain. As of 2016 the municipality has a population of 242 inhabitants.
