= Peñaranda Church =

Roman Catholic church in Nueva Ecija, Philippines

- Saint Francis of Assisi Parish Church
- Parokya ni San Francisco ng Assisi (Filipino)
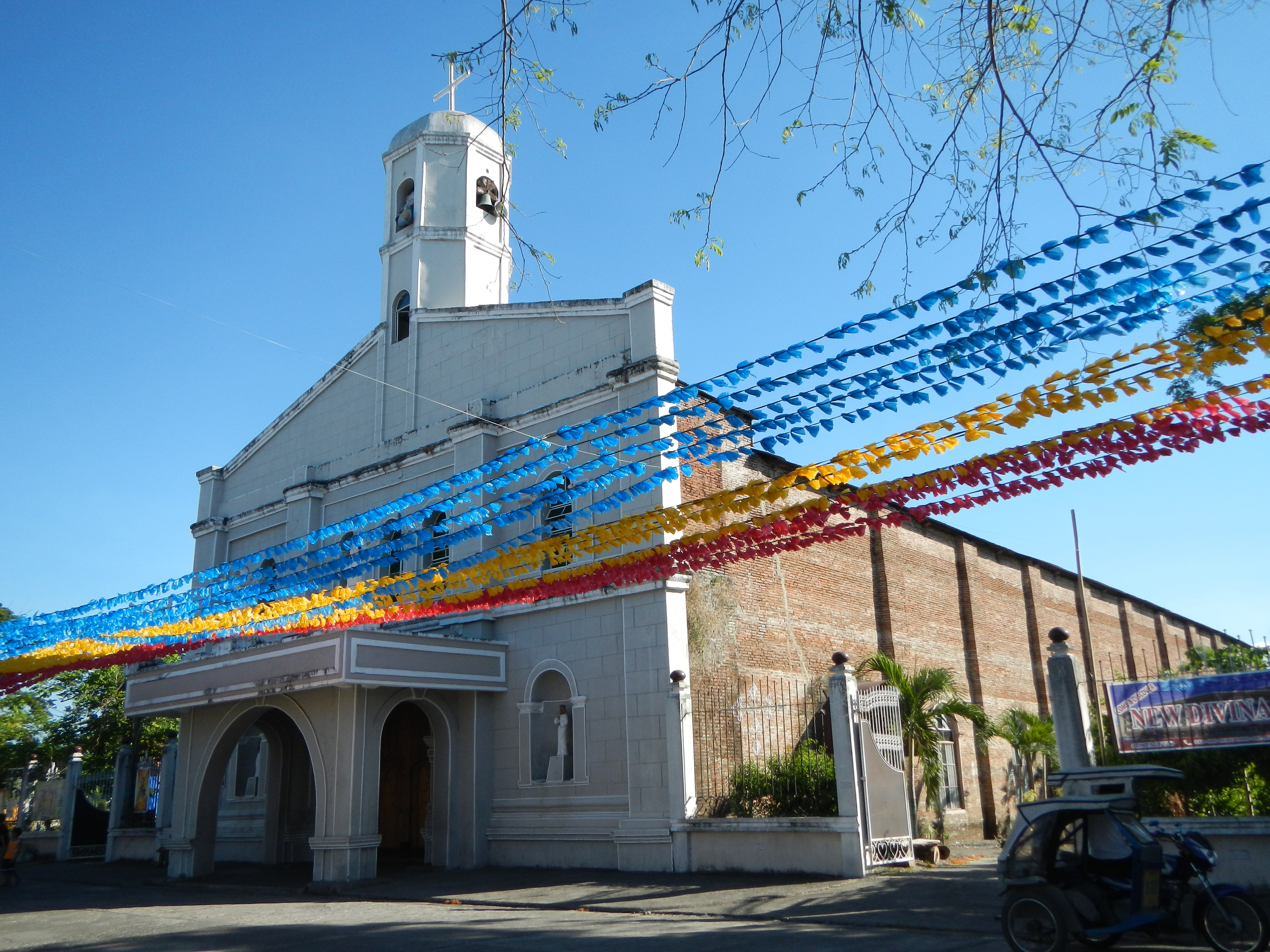
- The church in 2014

- Location in Nueva Ecija Location in Luzon Location in the Philippines
- 15°21′12.4″N 121°00′06.9″E
- Location: Peñaranda, Nueva Ecija
- Country: Philippines
- Denomination: Roman Catholic

History
- Status: Parish church
- Founded: 1853
- Dedication: Saint Francis of Assisi

Architecture
- Functional status: Active
- Heritage designation: NHCP Marked Structure
- Designated: 1951
- Architectural type: Church building
- Style: Baroque
- Groundbreaking: 1869
- Completed: 1889

Administration
- Archdiocese: Lingayen-Dagupan
- Diocese: Cabanatuan

Clergy
- Bishop: Prudencio Andaya Jr.

Saint Francis of Assisi Parish Church, commonly known as Peñaranda Church, is a Roman Catholic parish church located at Penaranda, Nueva Ecija, Philippines. It is under the Diocese of Cabanatuan with Francis of Assisi as patron saint.

== History ==
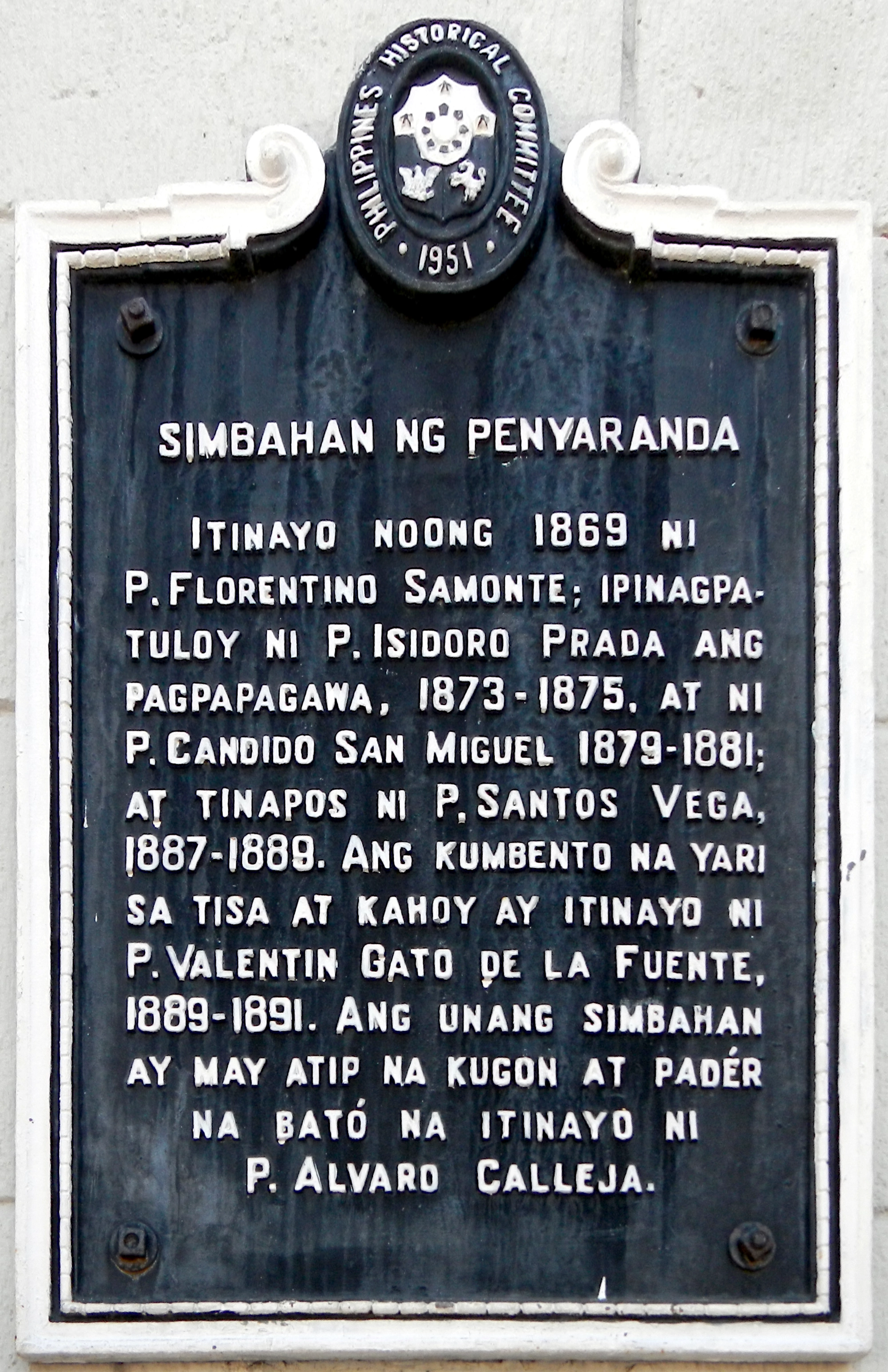
Church PHC historical marker installed in 1951

The Roman Catholic parish of Peñaranda was founded in 1853. Its first church with cogon roof and stone walls was constructed by Fr. Alvaro Calleja. In 1869, Fr. Florentino Samonte ordered the commencement of the church construction. This was continued by Fr. Isidoro Prada from 1873 to 1875, and also by Fr. Candido San Miguel from 1879 to 1881. The church was finished by Fr. Santos Vega from 1887 to 1889. The convent made of bricks and stone was built by Fr. Valentin Gato de la Fuente from 1889 to 1891. In 1951, a historical marker was unveiled for the church by the National Historical Commission of the Philippines.

It is one of the Jubilee Churches for the 500 Years of Christianity in the Philippines.

On October 4, 2024, a Solemn Mass was officiated by Archbishop Charles John Brown with Parish Priest Fr. Sedfrey J. Calderon to celebrate the patronal festival of Saint Francis of Assisi and the 170th Founding Anniversary of the Parish.

== Gallery ==
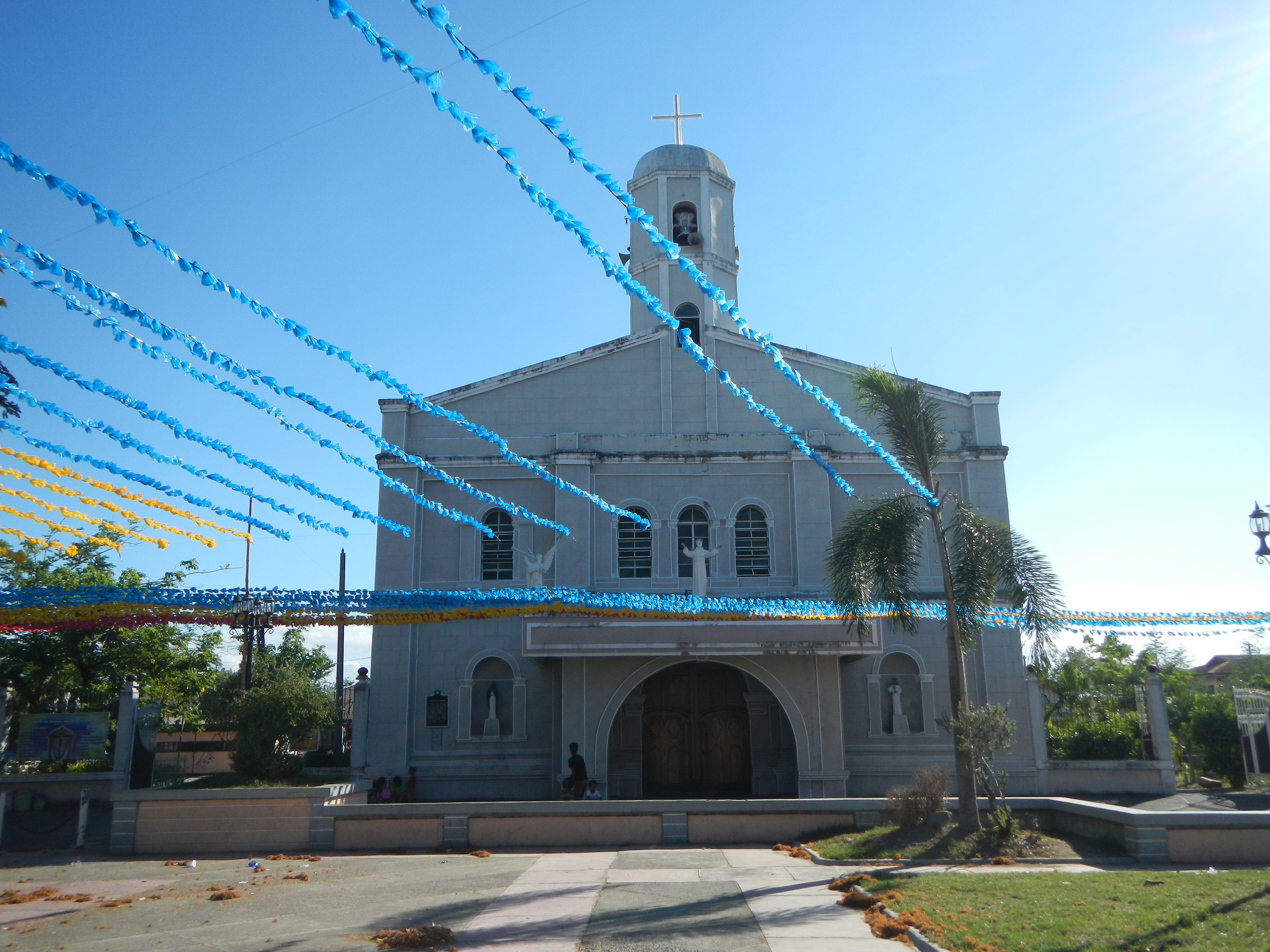
View of the facade from the church plaza

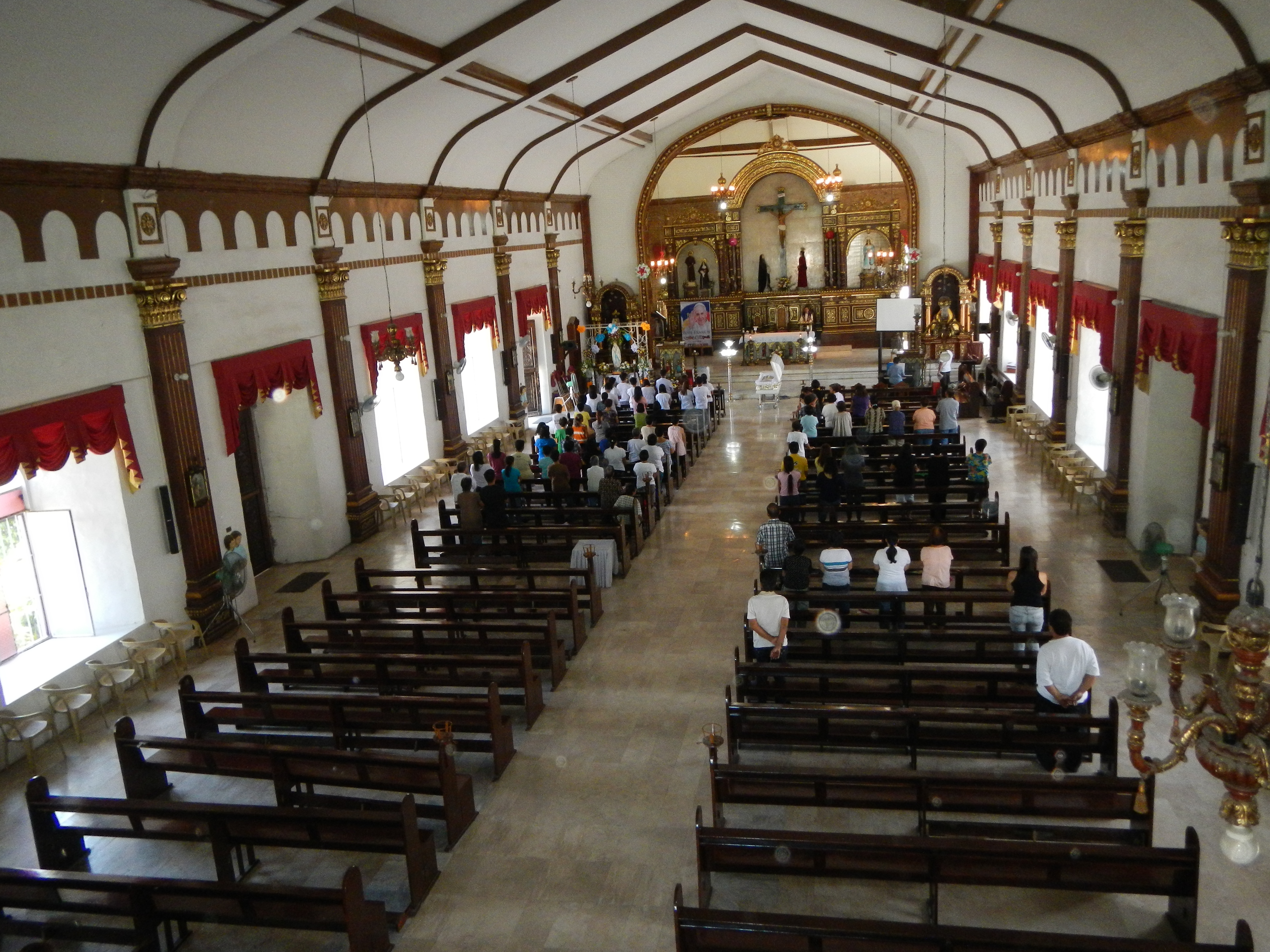
Interior view from the choir loft (2015)

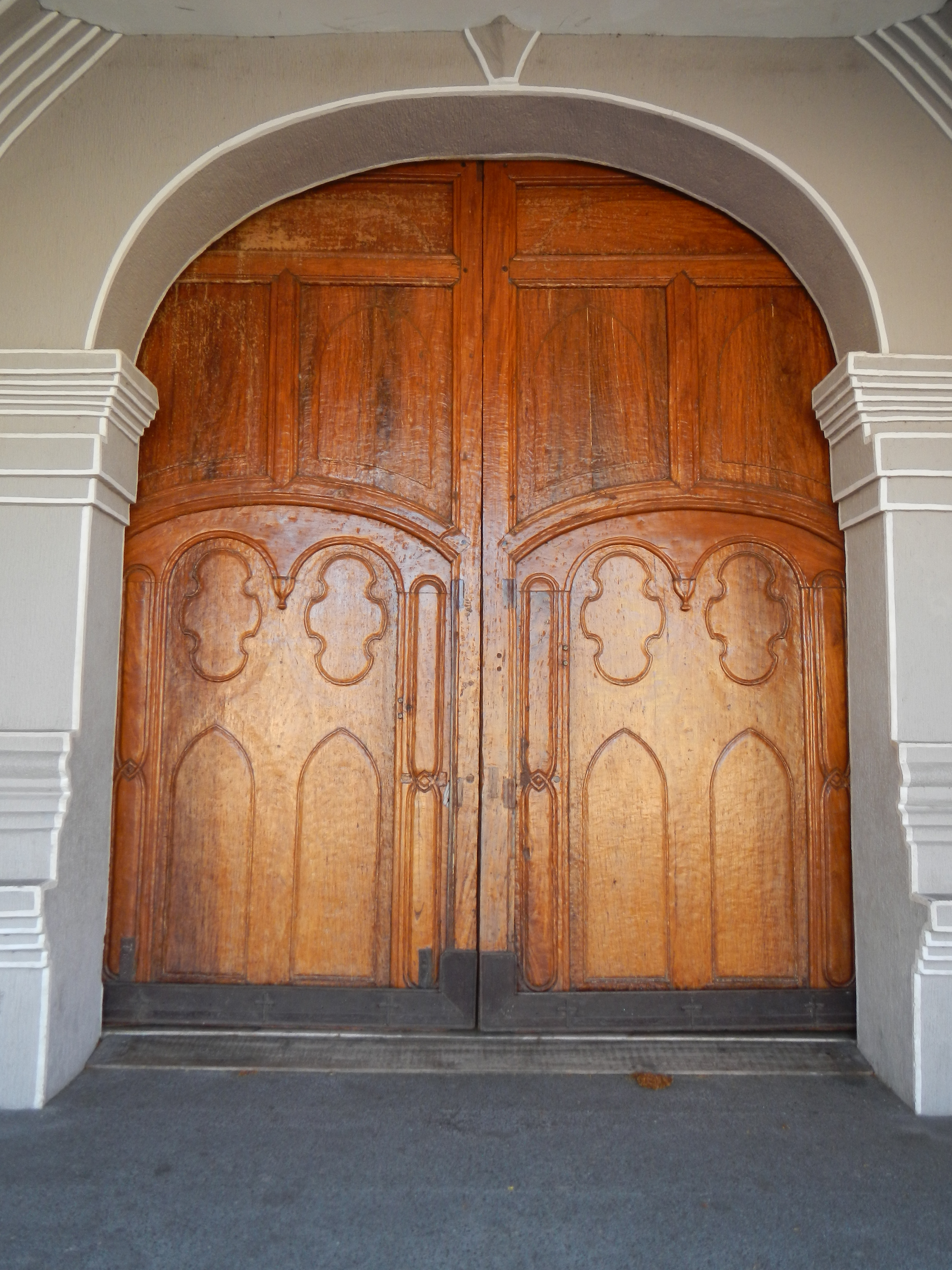
Church main door

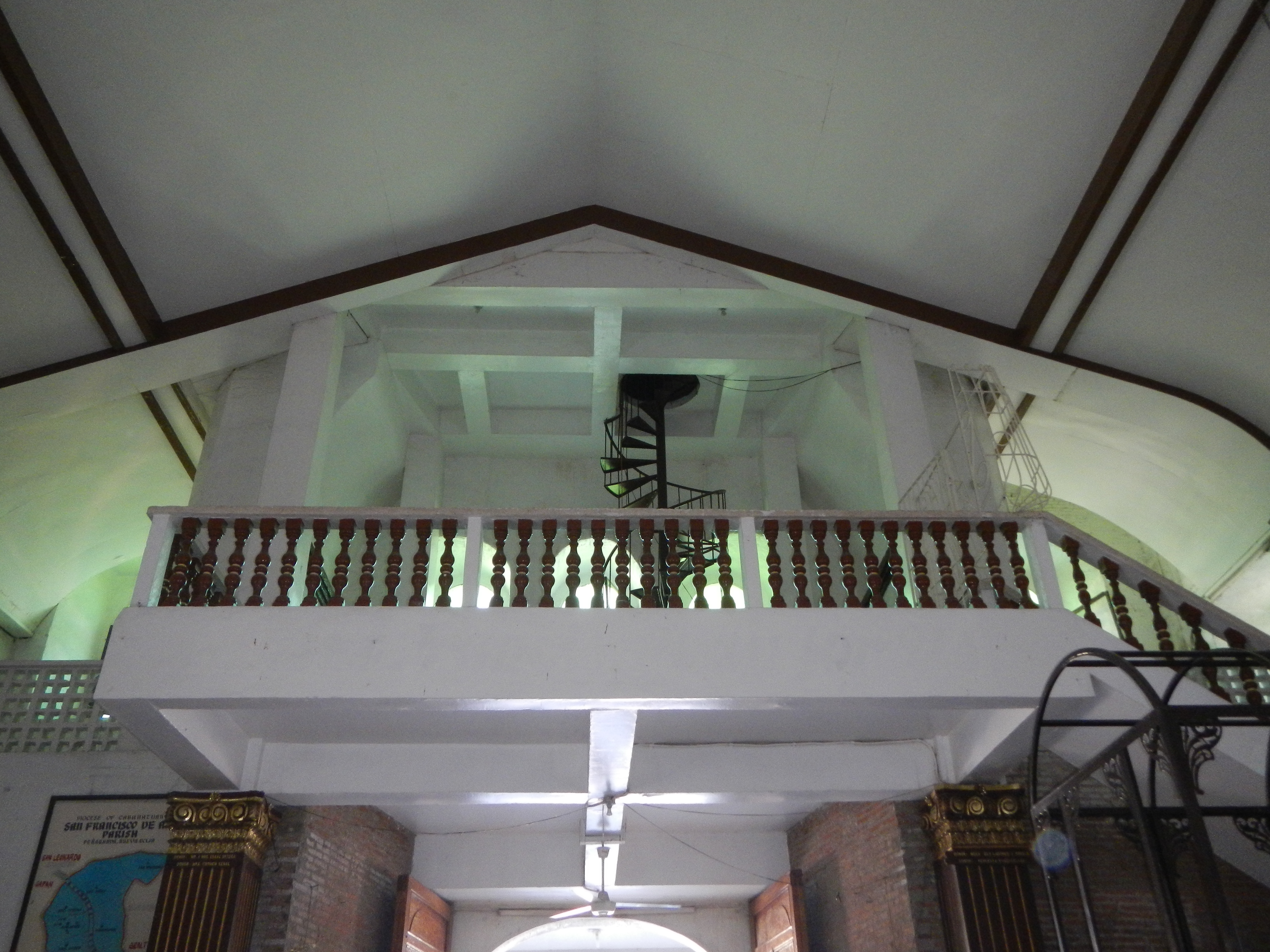
Stairway to the belfry

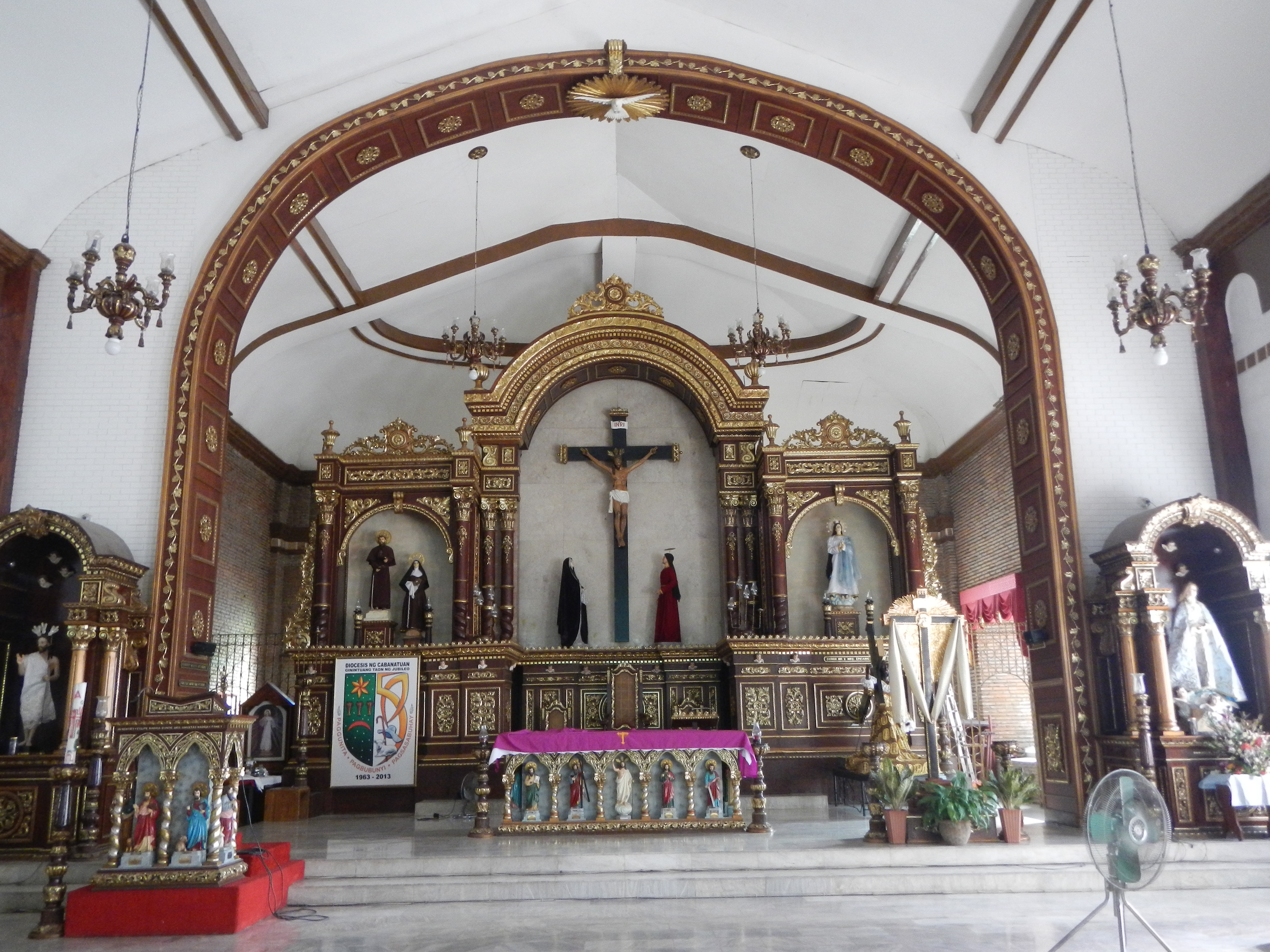
Church altar

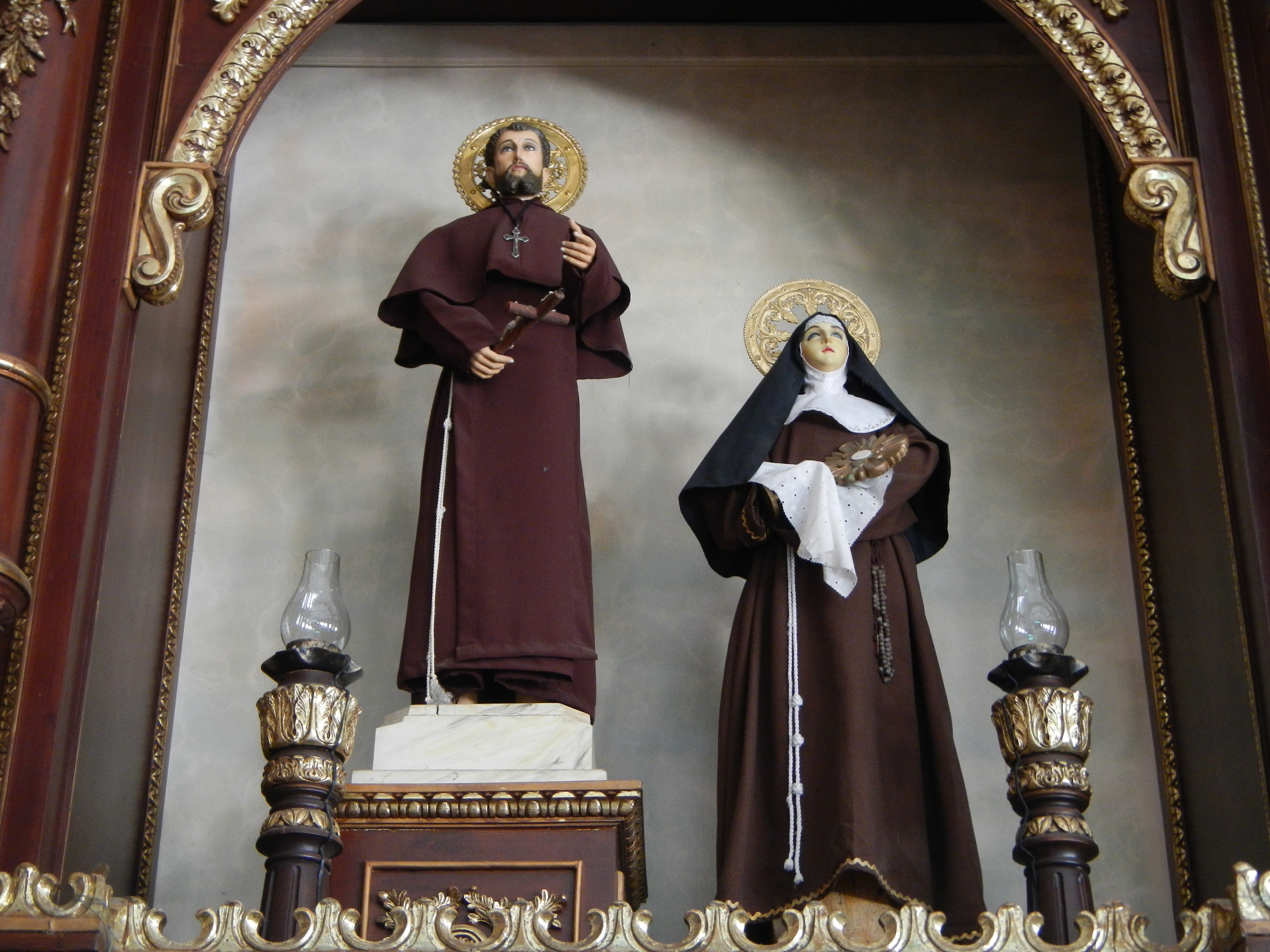
Religious images of Francis and Clare of Assisi

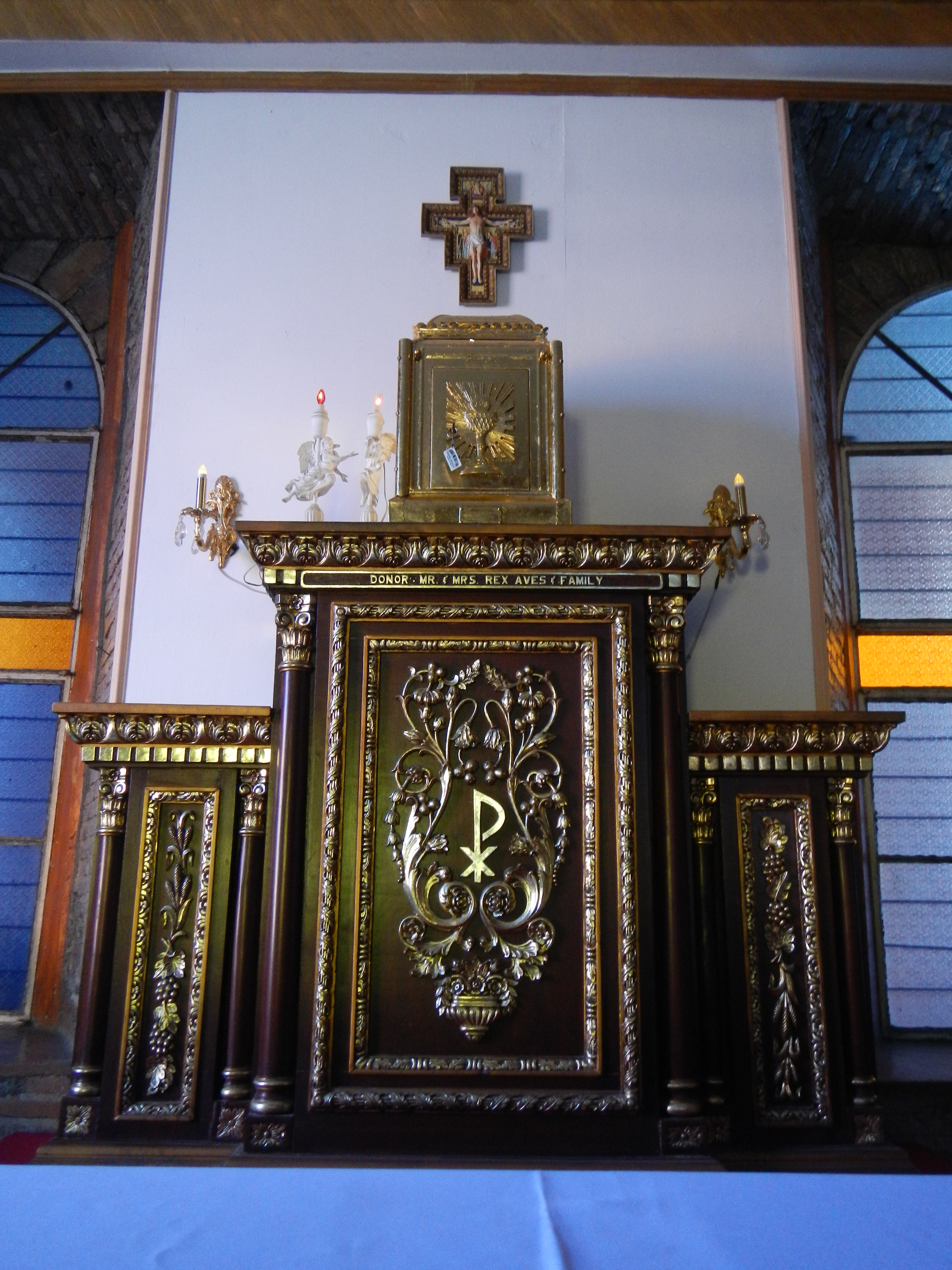
Church tabernacle

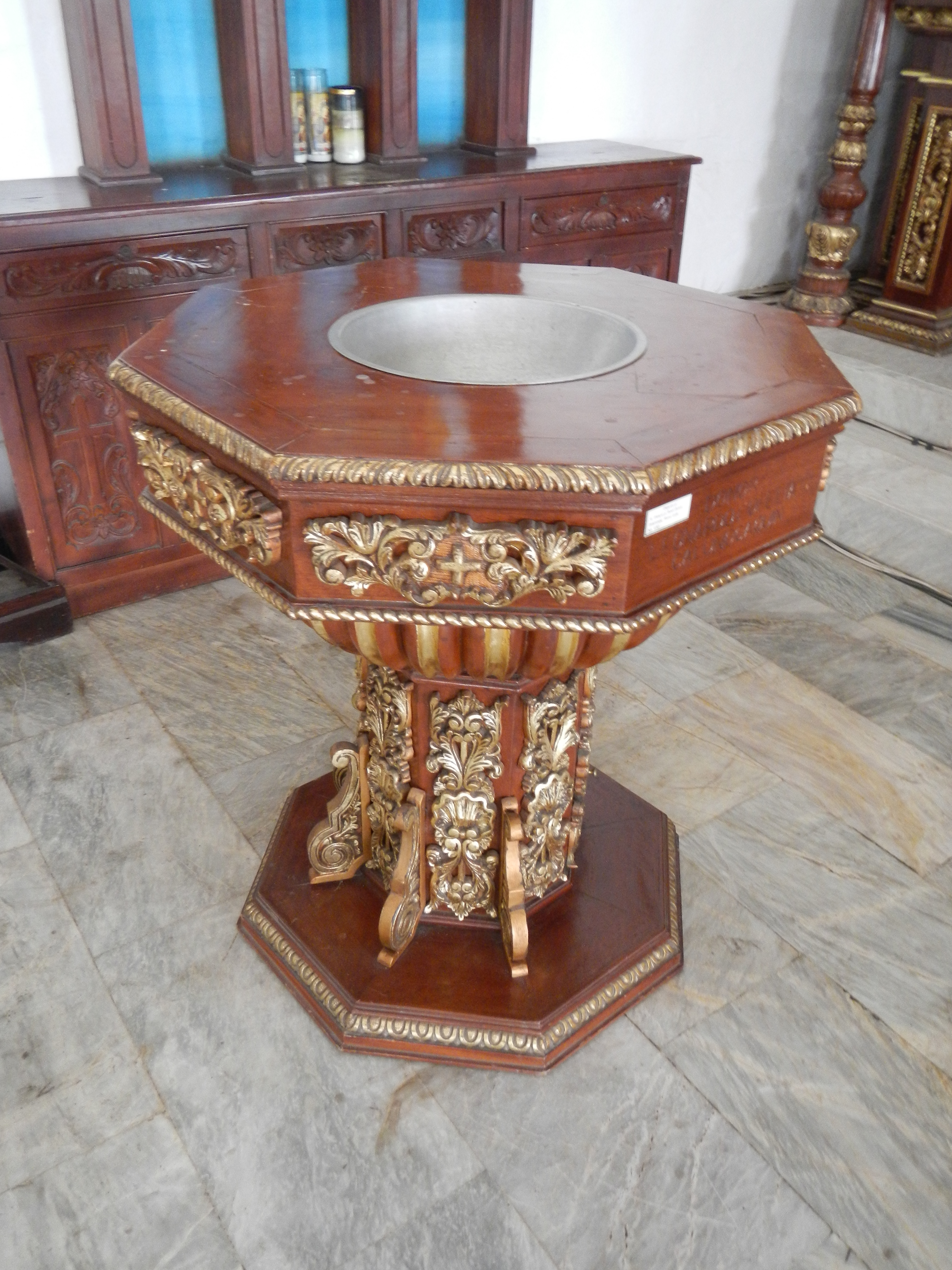
Baptismal font

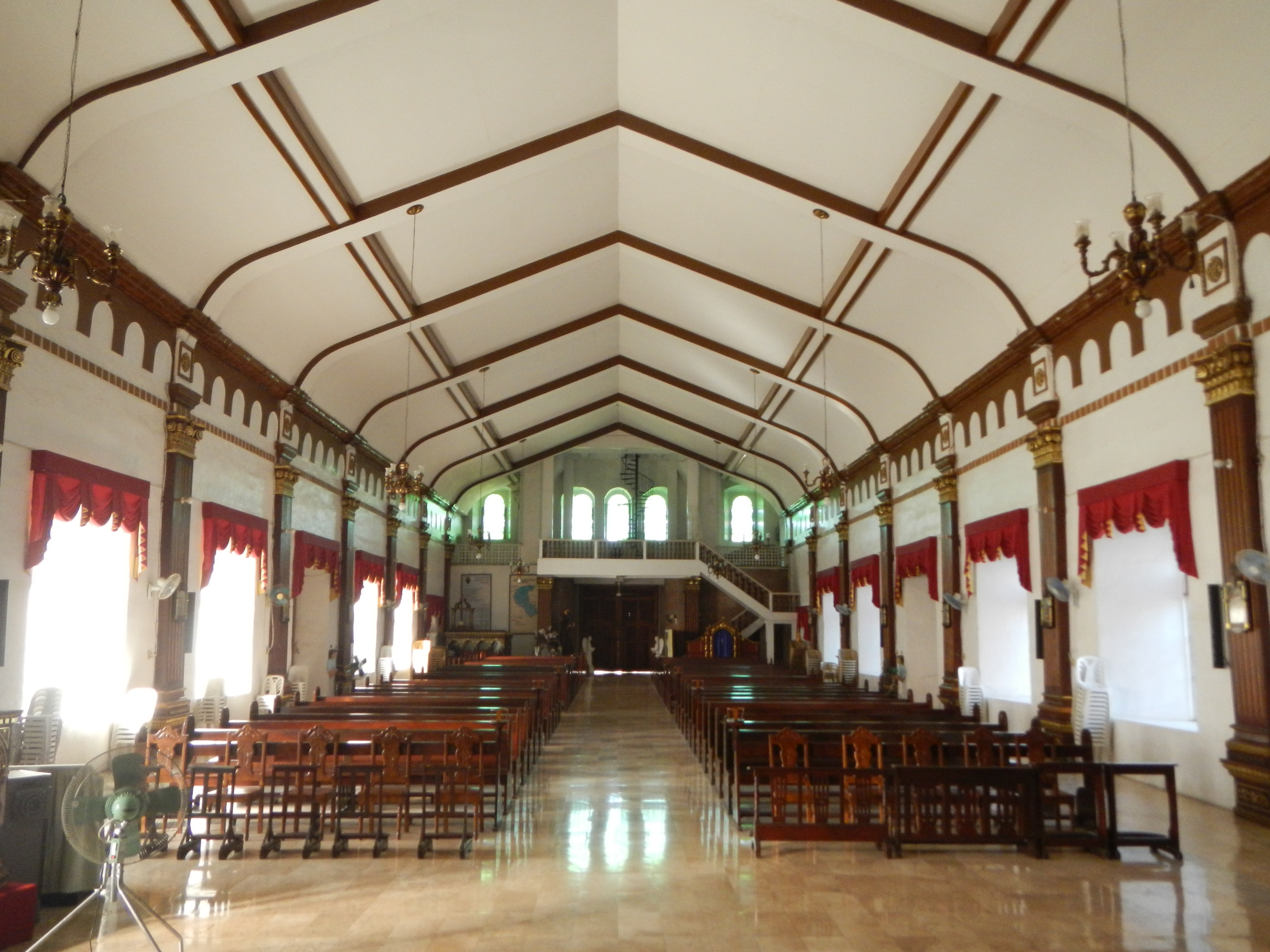
View of the nave from the altar

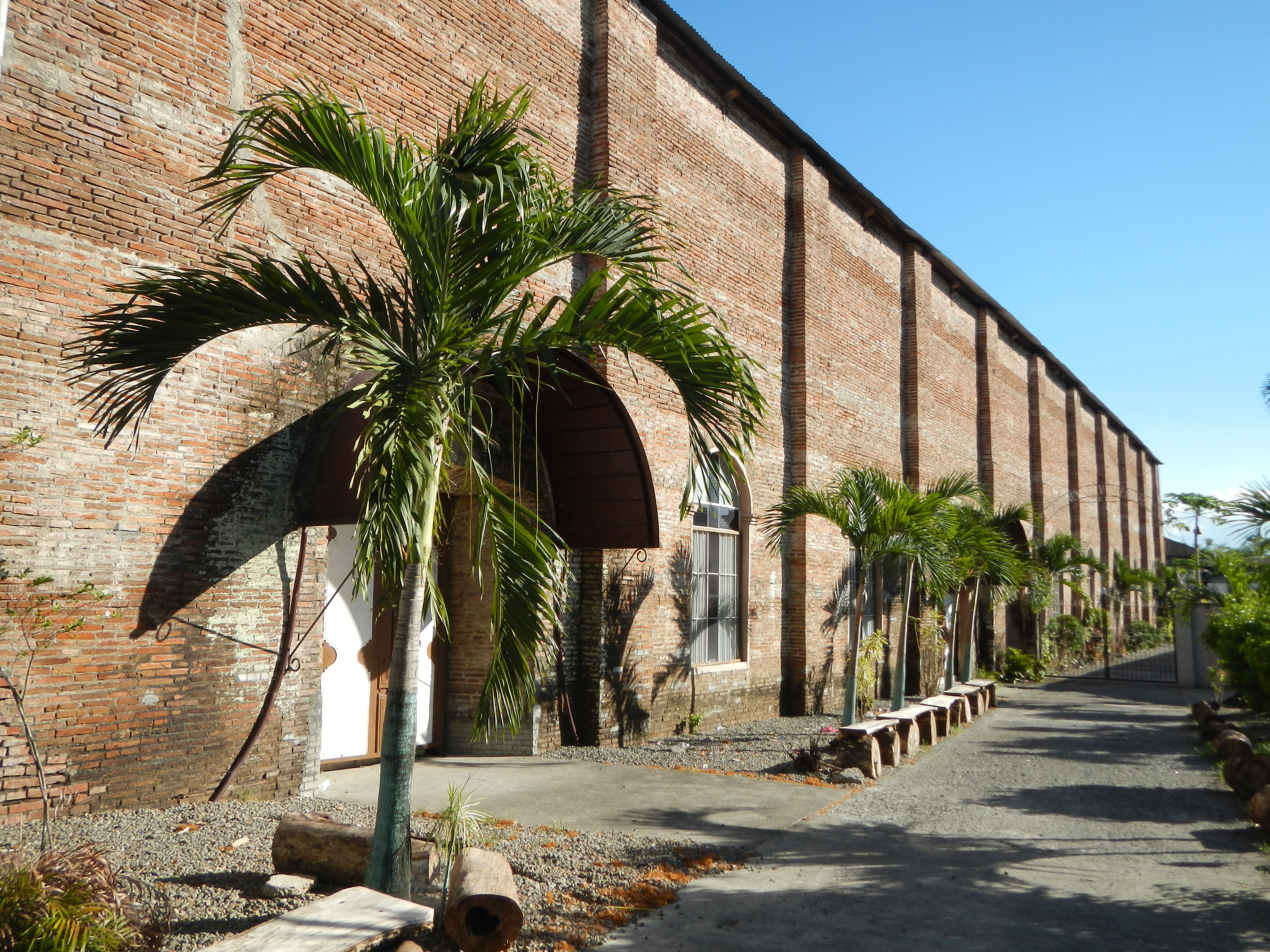
Side view of the church

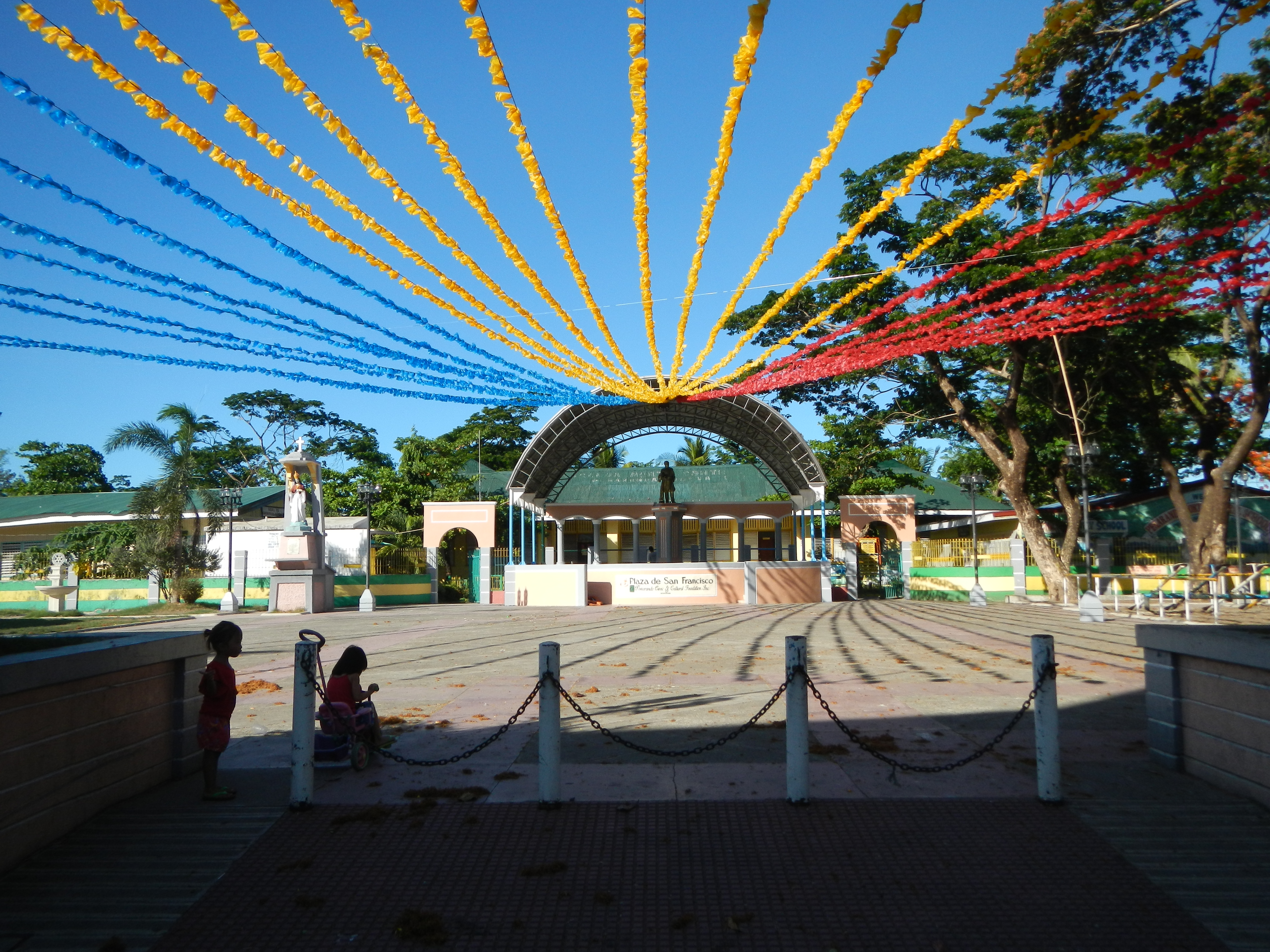
Church plaza
