= Tierra de Cantalapiedra =

Administrative area in Castile and León, Spain

Coordinates: 41°5′32″N 5°13′59″W

- Comarca
- Nicknames: La Guareñas, Las Guareñas
- Location in Salamanca
- Country: Spain
- Autonomous community: Castile and León
- Province: Salamanca

Area
  - Total: 281.13 km^{2} (108.54 sq mi)

Population (2010)
  - Total: 3,574
  - Density: 12.71/km^{2} (32.93/sq mi)
- Time zone: UTC+1 (CET)
  - Summer (DST): CEST

Tierra de Cantalapiedra is a comarca in the province of Salamanca, Castile and León. It contains six municipalities: Cantalapiedra, Cantalpino, Palaciosrubios, Poveda de las Cintas, Tarazona de Guareña and Villaflores.
