= Villaflores, Salamanca =

Villaflores
- Municipality
- Location in Salamanca
- Coordinates: 41°5′2″N 5°14′0″W
- Country: Spain
- Autonomous community: Castile and León
- Province: Salamanca
- Comarca: Tierra de Cantalapiedra

Government
  - Mayor: Vicente José González López (People's Party)

Area
  - Total: 42 km^{2} (16 sq mi)
- Elevation: 799 m (2,621 ft)

Population (2025-01-01)
  - Total: 255
  - Density: 6.1/km^{2} (16/sq mi)
- Time zone: UTC+1 (CET)
  - Summer (DST): UTC+2 (CEST)
- Postal code: 37406

Villaflores is a municipality located in the province of Salamanca, Castile and León, Spain. As of 2016 the municipality has a population of 293 inhabitants.
