= Peñaranda, Nueva Ecija =

Municipality in Nueva Ecija, Philippines

Peñaranda Mapisong
- Municipality
- Municipality of Peñaranda
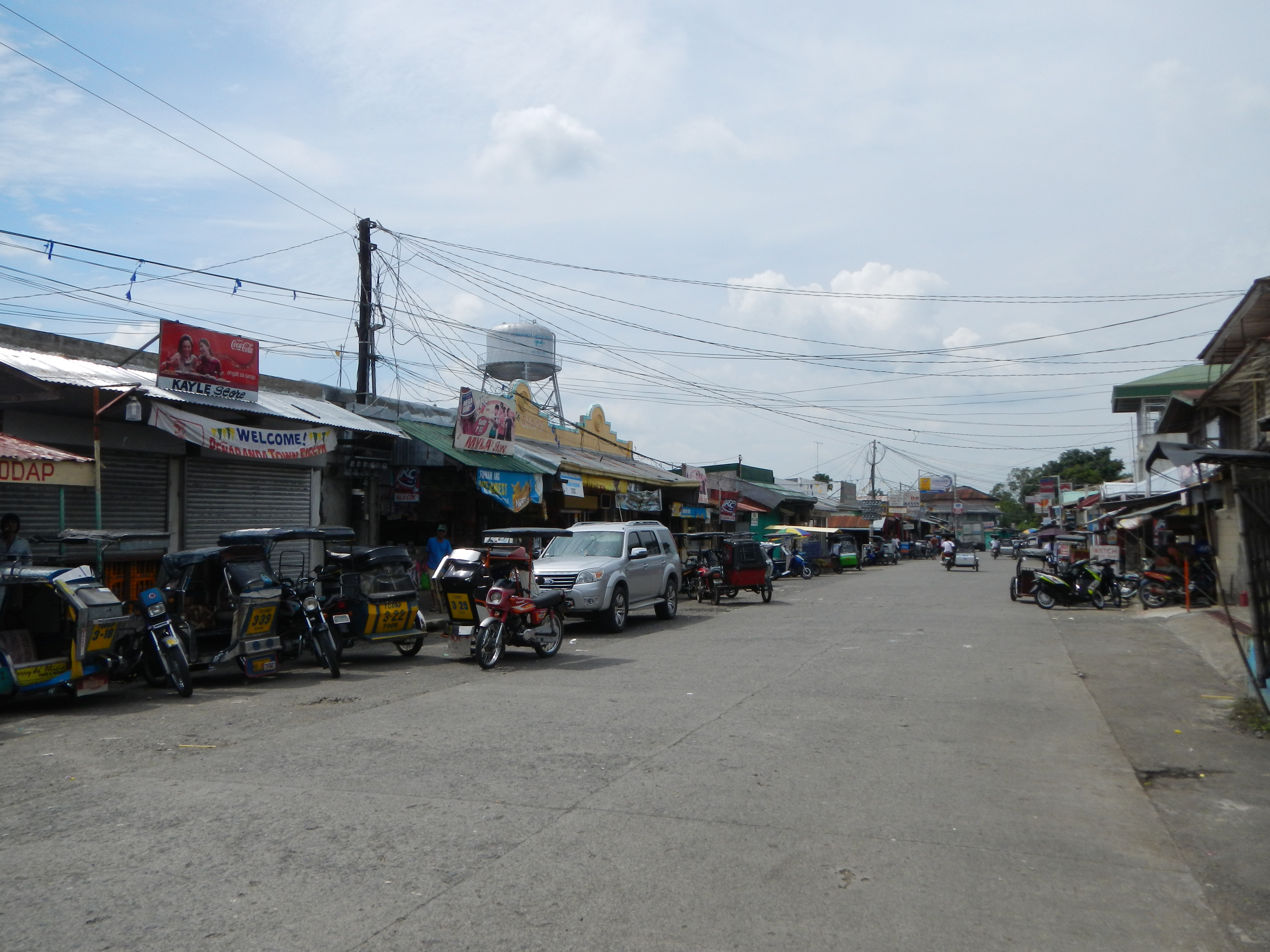
- Downtown area

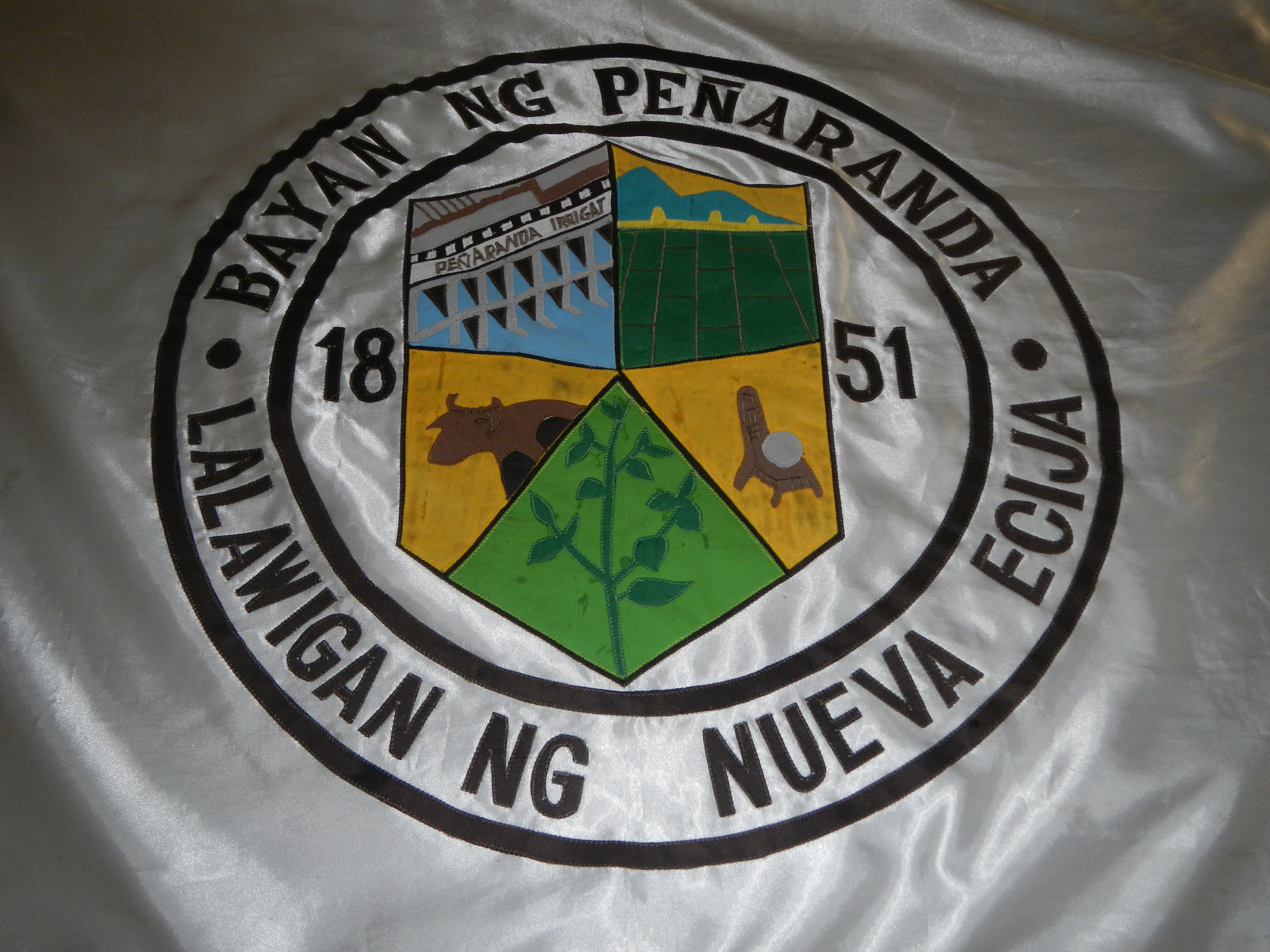
- Flag Seal

- Map of Nueva Ecija with Peñaranda highlighted
- Interactive map of Peñaranda
- Location within the Philippines
- Coordinates: 15°21′11″N 121°00′06″E
- Country: Philippines
- Region: Central Luzon
- Province: Nueva Ecija
- District: 4th district
- Named for: José Maria Peñaranda
- Barangays: 10 (see Barangays)

Government
  - Type: Sangguniang Bayan
  - Mayor: Joselito "Joey" A. Ramos
  - Vice Mayor: Genefer "Efer" Aves
  - Representative: Emerson D. Pascual
  - Municipal Council: Members: Rosano A. Corpuz; Sonny D. Reyes; Melchor A. Paderes; Herminia Gedo C. Castillo; Samuel P. Vallarta; Nerio M. Gonzales; Jenny Lynn A. Alarilla; Conrado M. Aberin
  - Electorate: 23,503 (2019)

Area
  - Total: 95.00 km^{2} (36.68 sq mi)
- Elevation: 38 m (125 ft)
- Highest elevation: 79 m (259 ft)
- Lowest elevation: 20 m (66 ft)

Population (2024 census)
  - Total: 33,043
  - Density: 347.8/km^{2} (900.9/sq mi)
  - Households: 7,635

Economy
  - Income class: 2nd municipal income class
  - Poverty incidence: 11.86% (2023)
  - Revenue: ₱ 218.8 million (2024)
  - Assets: ₱ 463.9 million (2024)
  - Expenditure: ₱ 206.5 million (2024)
  - Liabilities: ₱ 218 million (2024)

Service provider
  - Electricity: Nueva Ecija 2 Area 2 Electric Cooperative (NEECO 2 A2)
- Time zone: UTC+8 (PST)
- ZIP code: 3103
- PSGC: 0304921000
- IDD : area code: +63 (0)44
- Native languages: Tagalog; Ilocano

Peñaranda, officially the Municipality of Peñaranda (Tagalog: Bayan ng Peñaranda, Ilocano: Ili ti Peñaranda), is a municipality in the province of Nueva Ecija, Philippines. According to the 2024 census, it has a population of 33,043 people.

== Etymology ==
The area was originally called Mapisong and was a part of the municipality of Gapan. It was organized into a municipality by José Maria Peñaranda, a Spanish engineer, and subsequently named after him.

== Geography ==
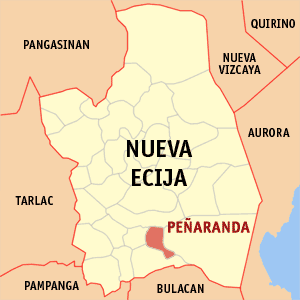
Previous Peñaranda map on June 8, 2008

The municipality of Peñaranda is bounded by the municipalities of General Tinio and San Leonardo and the city of Gapan.

=== Barangays ===
Peñaranda is politically subdivided into 10 barangays, as shown below. Each barangay consists of puroks and some have sitios.

- Callos
- Las Piñas
- Poblacion I
- Poblacion II
- Poblacion III
- Poblacion IV
- Santo Tomas
- Sinasajan
- San Josef
- San Mariano (Maugat)

=== Climate ===
Climate data for Peñaranda, Nueva Ecija
Month	Jan	Feb	Mar	Apr	May	Jun	Jul	Aug	Sep	Oct	Nov	Dec	Year
Mean daily maximum °C (°F)	29 (84)	30 (86)	31 (88)	34 (93)	33 (91)	31 (88)	30 (86)	29 (84)	29 (84)	30 (86)	30 (86)	29 (84)	30 (87)
Mean daily minimum °C (°F)	20 (68)	20 (68)	20 (68)	22 (72)	24 (75)	24 (75)	24 (75)	24 (75)	24 (75)	23 (73)	22 (72)	21 (70)	22 (72)
Average precipitation mm (inches)	4 (0.2)	4 (0.2)	5 (0.2)	11 (0.4)	66 (2.6)	99 (3.9)	127 (5.0)	113 (4.4)	99 (3.9)	84 (3.3)	35 (1.4)	14 (0.6)	661 (26.1)
Average rainy days	2.2	1.9	3.2	5.3	16.1	20.8	23.5	22.8	22.2	16.5	8.9	3.5	146.9
Source: Meteoblue

== Demographics ==
Population census of Peñaranda

Year	Pop.	±% p.a.
1903	8,410	—
1918	9,250	+0.64%
1939	9,423	+0.09%
1948	9,623	+0.23%
1960	10,768	+0.94%
1970	14,226	+2.82%
1975	15,142	+1.26%
1980	16,753	+2.04%

Year	Pop.	±% p.a.
1990	20,500	+2.04%
1995	22,661	+1.90%
2000	24,749	+1.91%
2007	26,725	+1.07%
2010	27,410	+0.93%
2015	29,882	+1.66%
2020	32,269	+1.63%
2024	33,043	+0.57%

Source: Philippine Statistics Authority

=== Religion ===
Majority of the people is Roman Catholic. Other religious groups have churches and places of worship in the municipality.

== Economy ==
Poverty incidence of Peñaranda (%)

Source: Philippine Statistics Authority

Primarily depends on rice & vegetable farming, poultry and piggery. Peñaranda was once known for its high-quality crop called ikmo, a plant used by older Filipinos as a chewing substance. Recently however, the crop is on the brink of extinction. Rice remains a flourishing farm produce.

== Culture ==
Every May, Peñaranda residents stage a musical drama called "Araquio", a re-enactment of Christians' quest led by Queen Helena and King Constantine for the Holy Cross where Jesus Christ was nailed. Actors and actresses garbed in colorful and cute costumes dramatize this century old tradition which features sword fights between the Christians and Moros.

In 2012, the National Commission for Culture and the Arts (NCCA) and the ICHCAP of UNESCO published Pinagmulan: Enumeration from the Philippine Inventory of Intangible Cultural Heritage. The first edition of the UNESCO-backed book included Araquio, signifying its great importance to Philippine intangible cultural heritage. The local government of Nueva Ecija, in cooperation with the NCCA, is given the right to nominate the Araquio in the UNESCO Intangible Cultural Heritage Lists.

Peñaranda is also known for its mouth-watering, native rice cakes such as espasol, putong puti and sapin-sapin .

== Education ==
The Peñaranda Schools District Office governs all educational institutions within the municipality. It oversees the management and operations of all private and public, from primary to secondary schools.

Nueva Ecija University of Science and Technology Peñaranda Off-Campus opened in 2005. This is a joint undertaking of the Nueva Ecija University of Science and Technology and the Local Government Unit of Peñaranda. It is located at the vicinity of the Peñaranda National High School.

=== Primary and elementary schools ===
- God's Family Christian Academy
- Kapt. Pedro Villanueva Elementary School
- Peñaranda Central School
- Peñaranda North Central School
- San Josef Elementary School
- San Mariano Elementary School
- St. Andrew Christian Academy
- St. Francis Development Center
- Sto. Tomas Elementary School
- Westside Montessori Centrum

=== Secondary schools ===
- Callos Integrated School
- Las Piñas Integrated School
- Peñaranda National High School

== Gallery ==
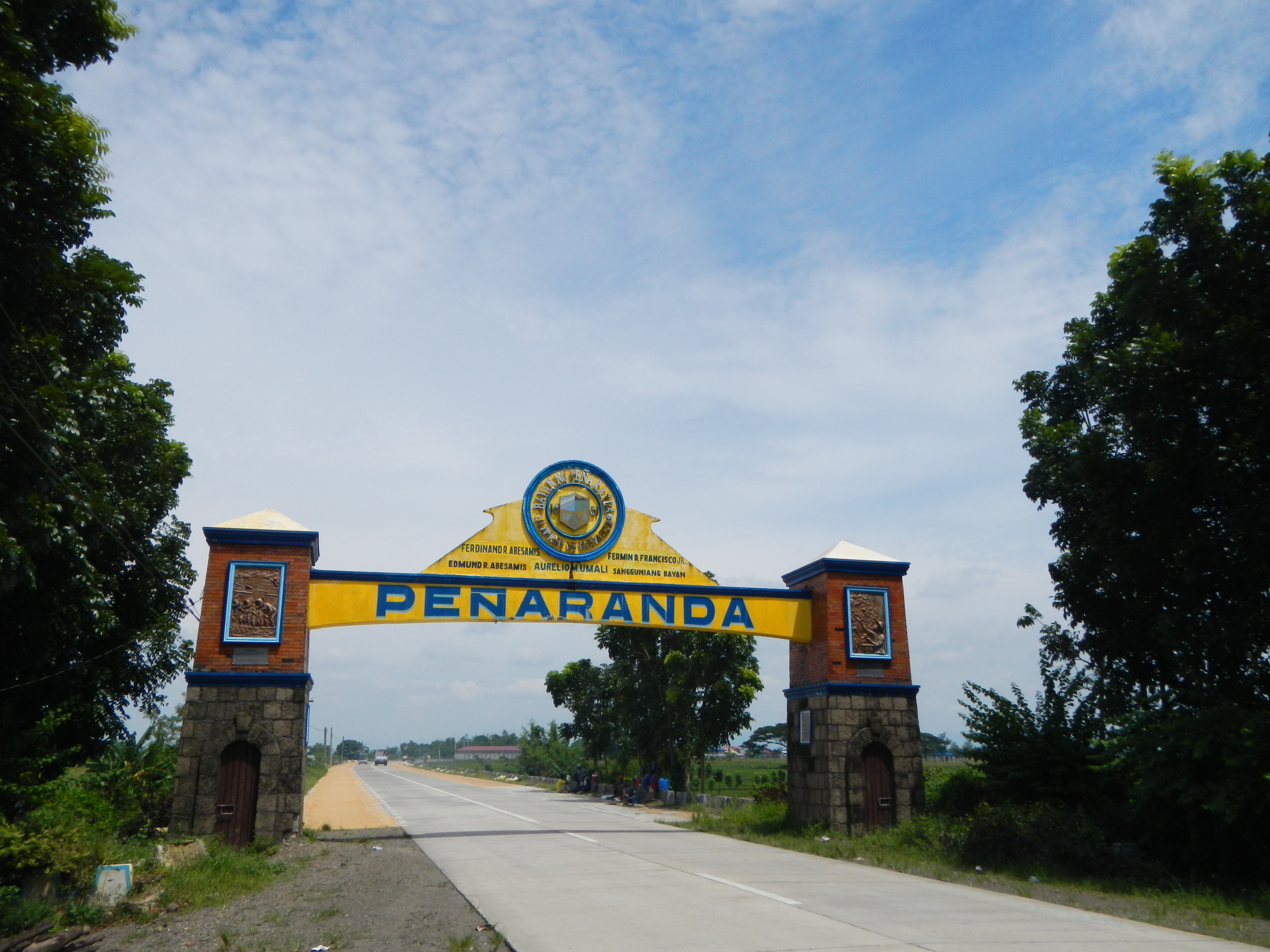
Welcome marker

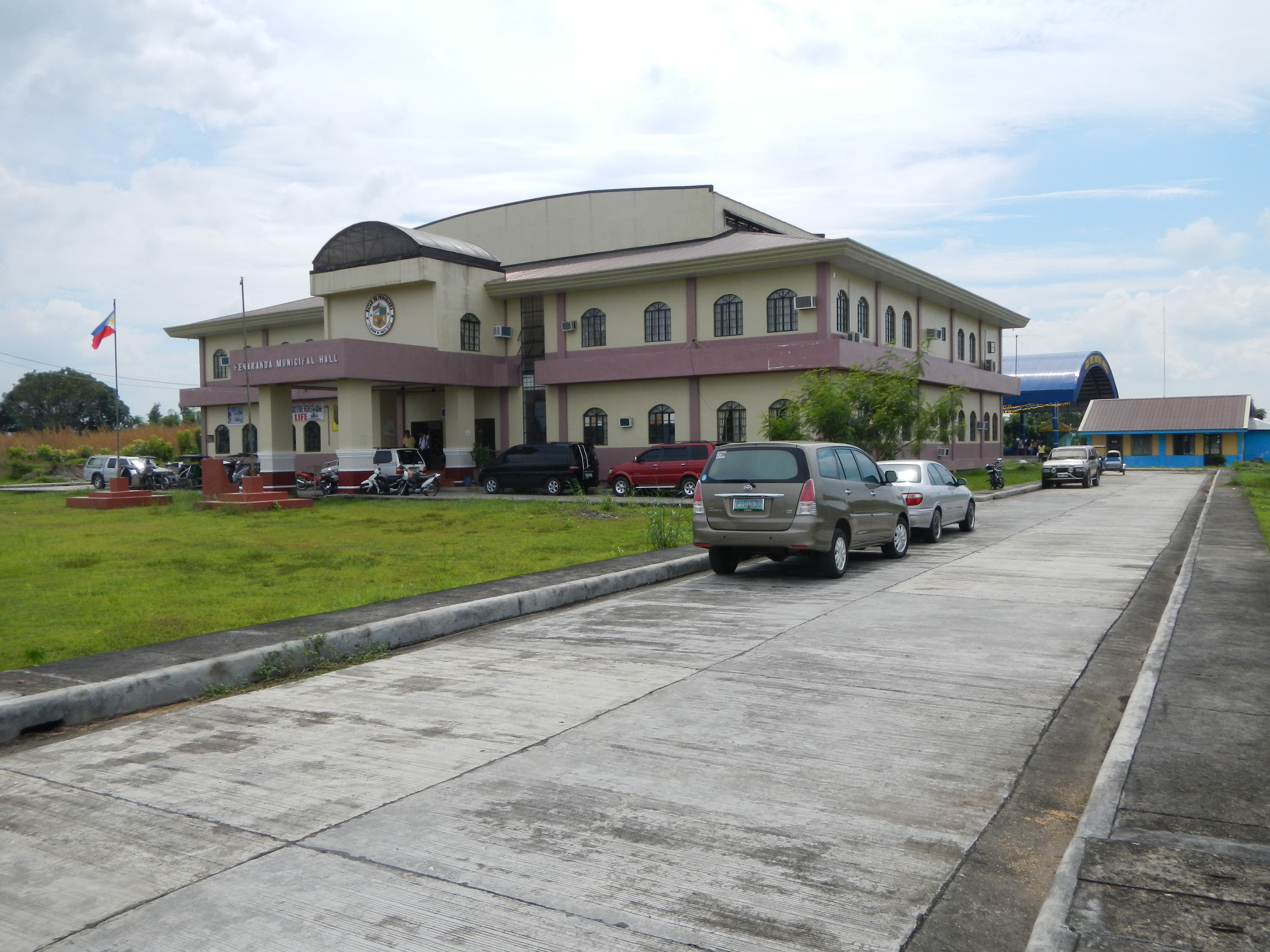
Town hall, seat of the Government

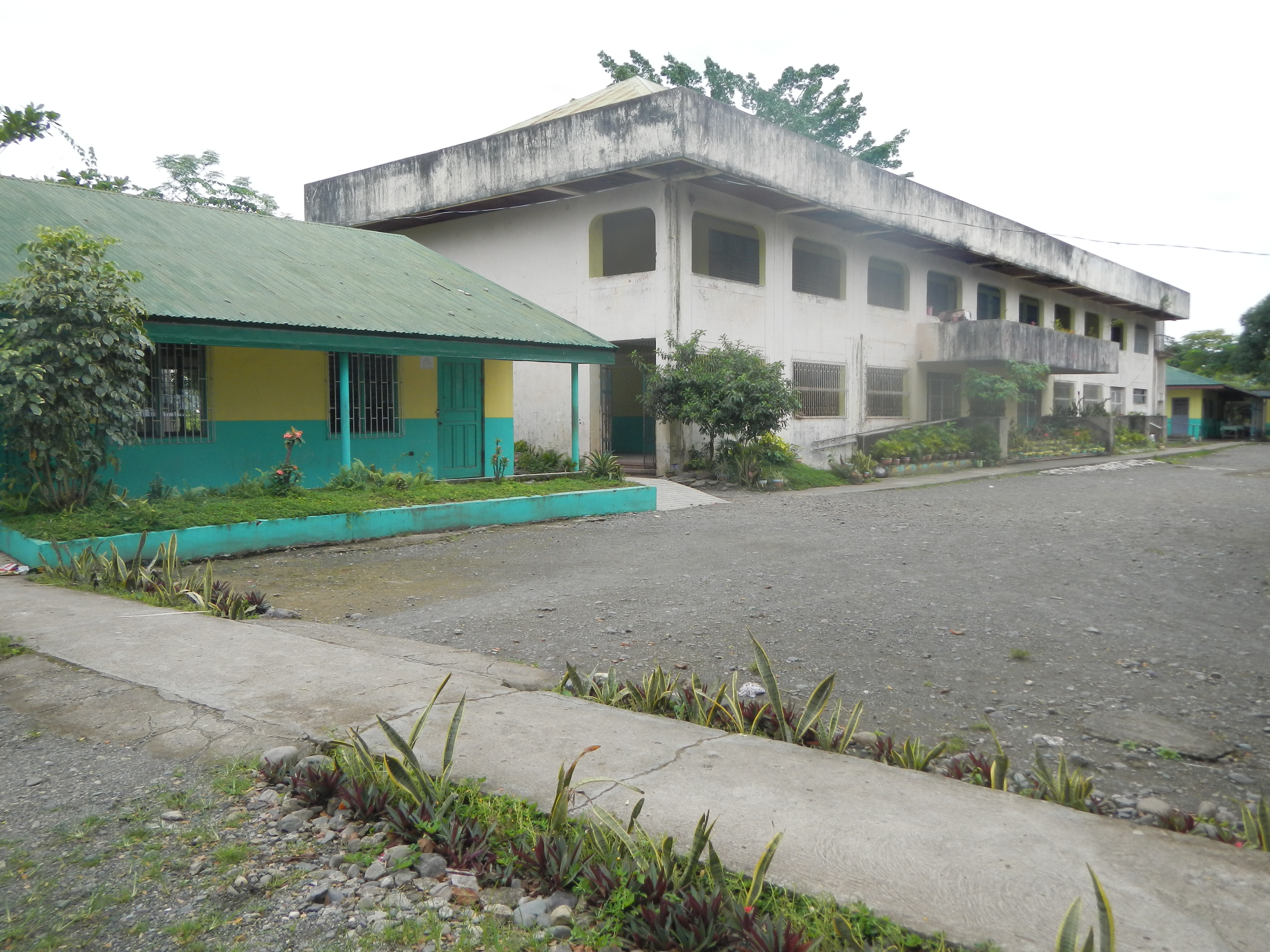
Nueva Ecija University of Science and Technology

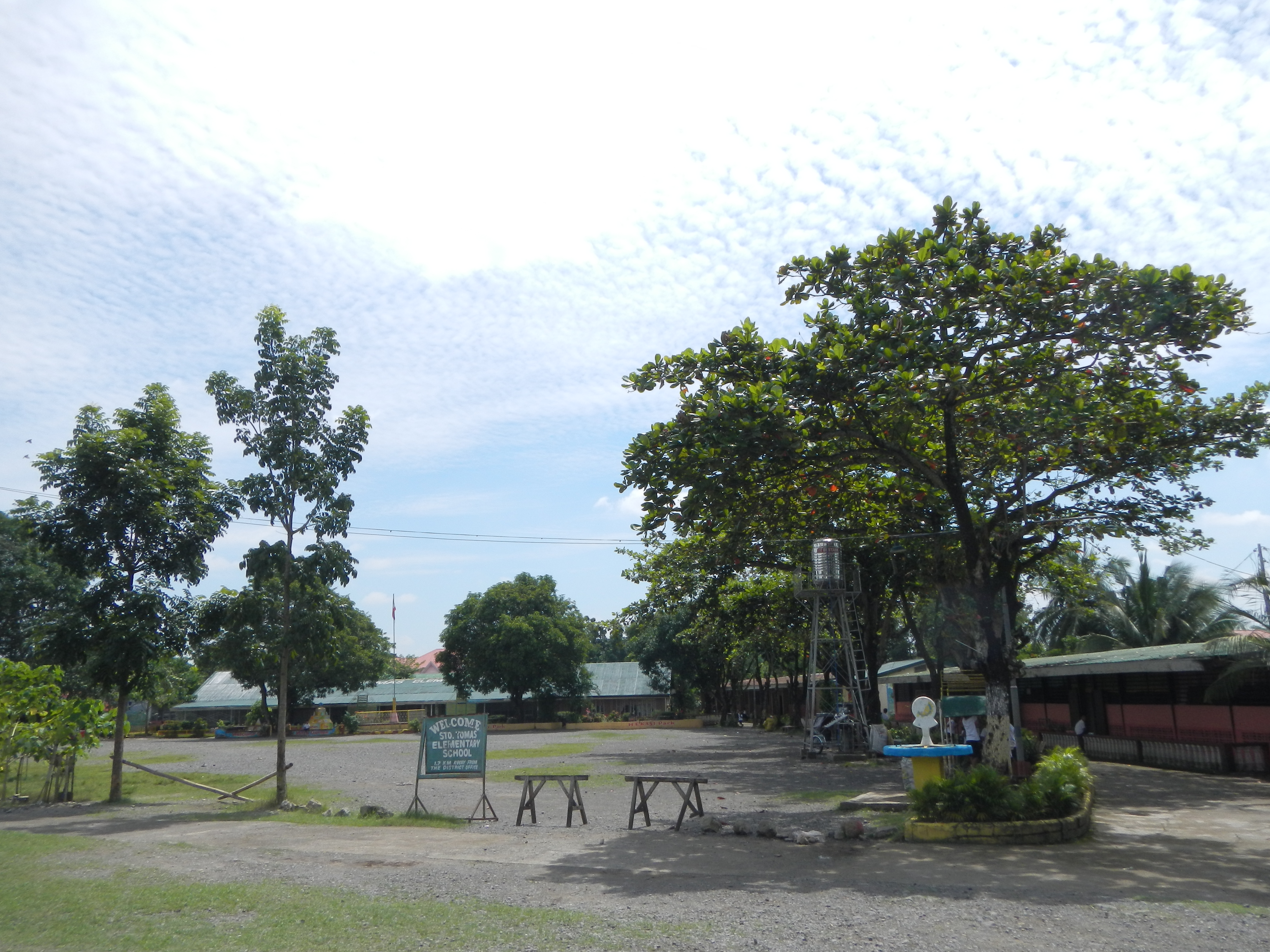
Santo Tomas Elementary School

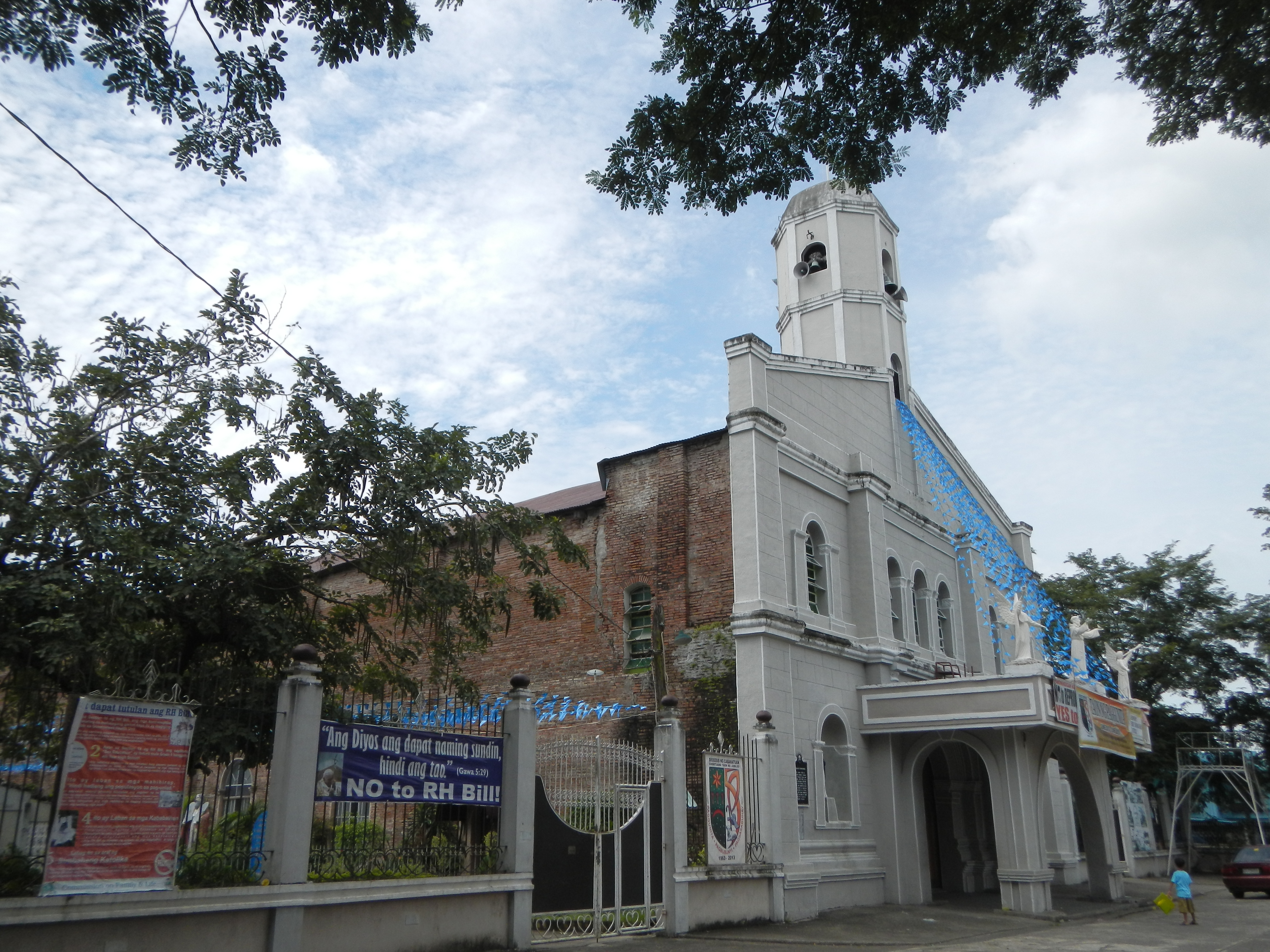
Parish of St. Francis of Assisi

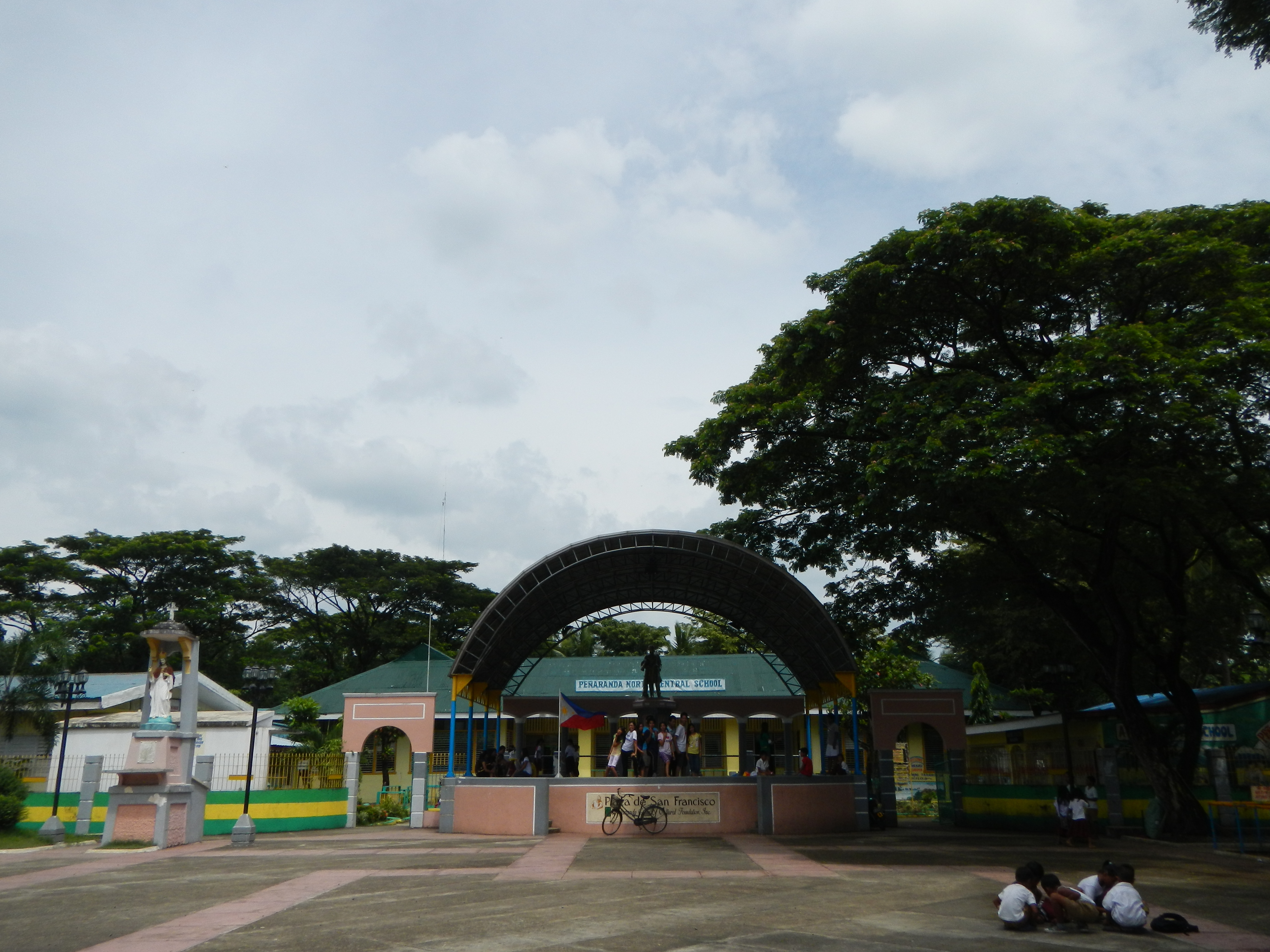
Plaza of the Church
