= Eloy Tarazona =

Venezuelan soldier (1880–1953)

- Born: 1880
- Died: 1953 (aged 72–73)
- Military career
- Allegiance: Venezuelan
- Nickname: The Indian Tarazona

Eloy Tarazona (1880–1953) was a Venezuelan military figure known by his nickname El Indio.

He was arrested by Eleazar López Contreras on 15 December 1935.
