= Tarazona de Guareña =

- Municipality
- Coat of arms

- Location in Salamanca
- Coordinates: 41°10′15″N 5°14′59″W
- Country: Spain
- Autonomous community: Castile and León
- Province: Salamanca
- Comarca: Tierra de Cantalapiedra

Government
  - Mayor: José Luis Barajas Sánchez (People's Party)

Area
  - Total: 29 km^{2} (11 sq mi)
- Elevation: 772 m (2,533 ft)

Population (2025-01-01)
  - Total: 261
  - Density: 9.0/km^{2} (23/sq mi)
- Time zone: UTC+1 (CET)
  - Summer (DST): UTC+2 (CEST)
- Postal code: 37409

Tarazona de Guareña is a municipality located in the province of Salamanca, Castile and León, Spain. As of 2016 the municipality has a population of 330 inhabitants.
