= Longva =

Village in Haram Municipality, Norway

- Village
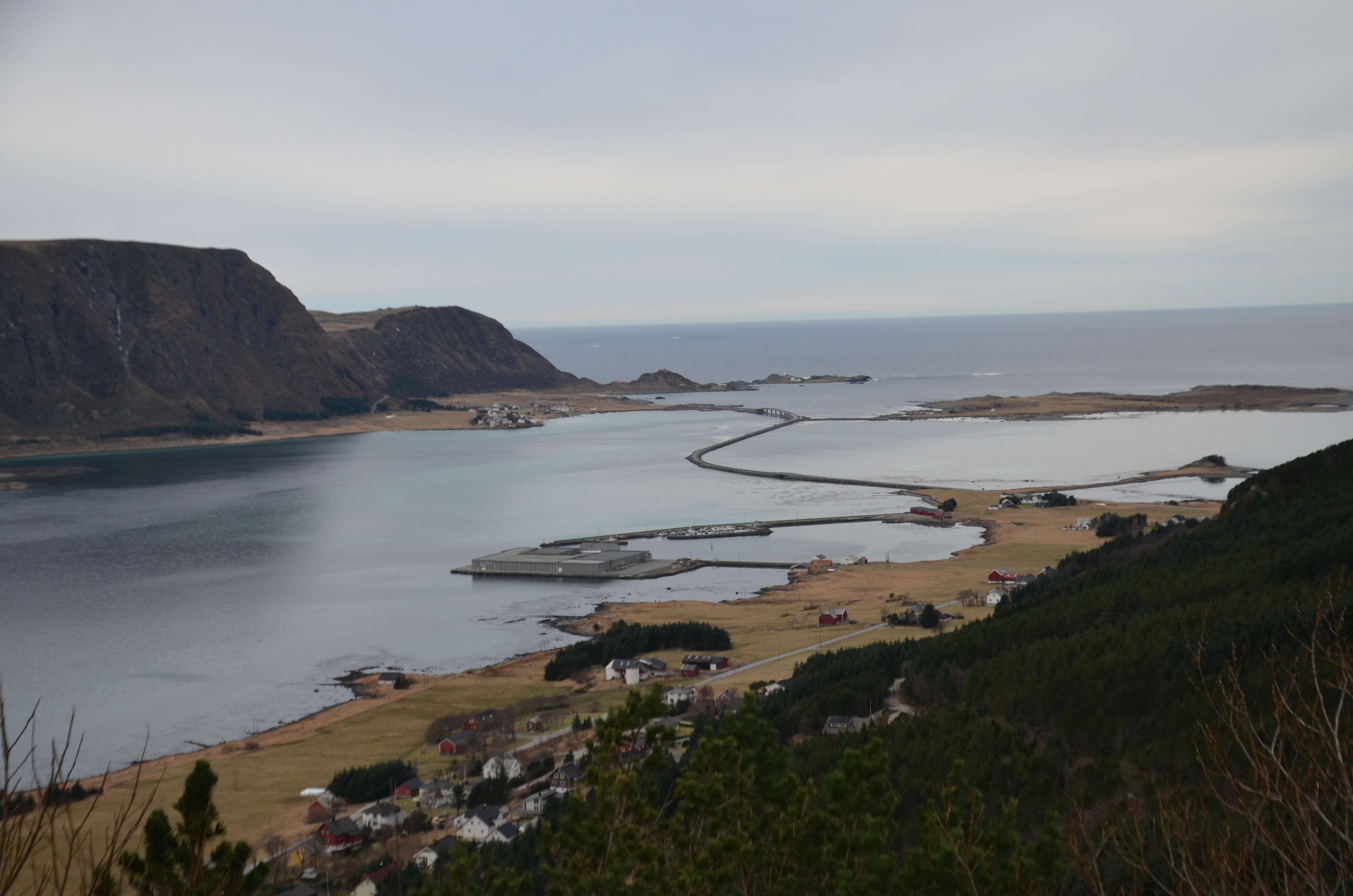
- Longva is in the lower foreground of the picture.
- Interactive map of Longva
- Location within Møre og Romsdal Location within Norway
- Coordinates: 62.6647°N 6.2742°E
- Country: Norway
- Region: Western Norway
- County: Møre og Romsdal
- District: Sunnmøre
- Municipality: Haram Municipality

Area
  - Total: 0.37 km^{2} (0.14 sq mi)
- Elevation: 10 m (33 ft)

Population (2003)
  - Total: 237
  - Density: 641/km^{2} (1,660/sq mi)
- Time zone: UTC+01:00 (CET)
  - Summer (DST): UTC+02:00 (CEST)
- Post Code: 6293 Longva

Longva is a village in Haram Municipality in Møre og Romsdal county, Norway. The village is located on the southwest side of the island of Skuløya, along the Longvafjorden. It is about 12 kilometres (7.5 mi) northeast of the village of Austnes on Haramsøya via the Ullasund Bridge. The Nogvafjord Tunnel runs from the village of Longva to the north to the island of Fjørtofta.

The 0.37-square-kilometre (91-acre) village had a population (2003) of 237 and a population density of 641 inhabitants per square kilometre (1,660/sq mi). Since 2003, the population and area data for this village area has not been separately tracked by Statistics Norway.
