= Austnes =

Village in Haram Municipality, Norway

- Village
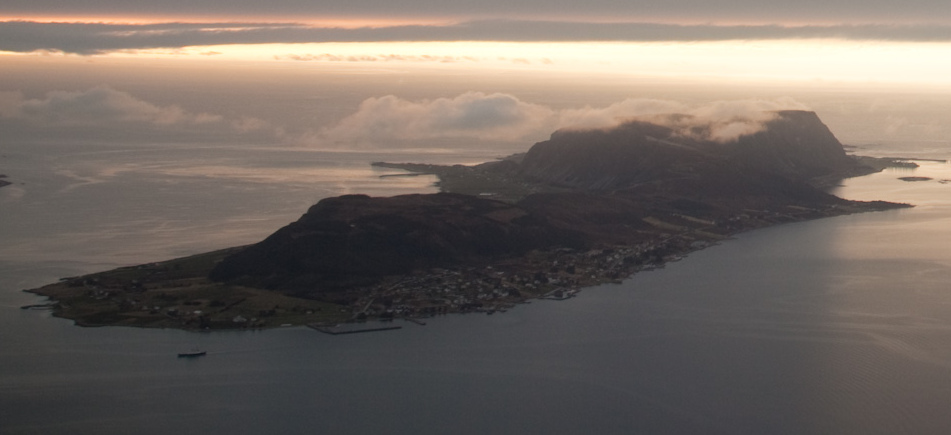
- Austnes in the center, along the shore
- Interactive map of Austnes
- Location within Møre og Romsdal Location within Norway
- Coordinates: 62.6373°N 6.2735°E
- Country: Norway
- Region: Western Norway
- County: Møre og Romsdal
- District: Sunnmøre
- Municipality: Haram Municipality

Area
  - Total: 0.53 km^{2} (0.20 sq mi)
- Elevation: 10 m (33 ft)

Population (2024)
  - Total: 382
  - Density: 721/km^{2} (1,870/sq mi)
- Time zone: UTC+01:00 (CET)
  - Summer (DST): UTC+02:00 (CEST)
- Post Code: 6290 Haramsøy

Austnes is a village in Haram Municipality in Møre og Romsdal county, Norway. It is located on the southeast side of the island of Haramsøya, about 12 kilometres (7.5 mi) southwest of the village of Longva via the Ullasund Bridge. The Ulla lighthouse is located about 7 kilometres (4.3 mi) to the north of Austnes. The historic Haram Church is located in Austnes.

The 0.53-square-kilometre (130-acre) village has a population (2024) of 382 and a population density of 721 inhabitants per square kilometre (1,870/sq mi).

The Nordøyvegen bridge and tunnel network was completed in 2022 and it connected Austnes to the islands of Lepsøya and the mainland via the Haramsfjord Tunnel.
