= Myklebust, Harøya =

Village in Ålesund Municipality, Norway

Myklebust Myklebost
- Village
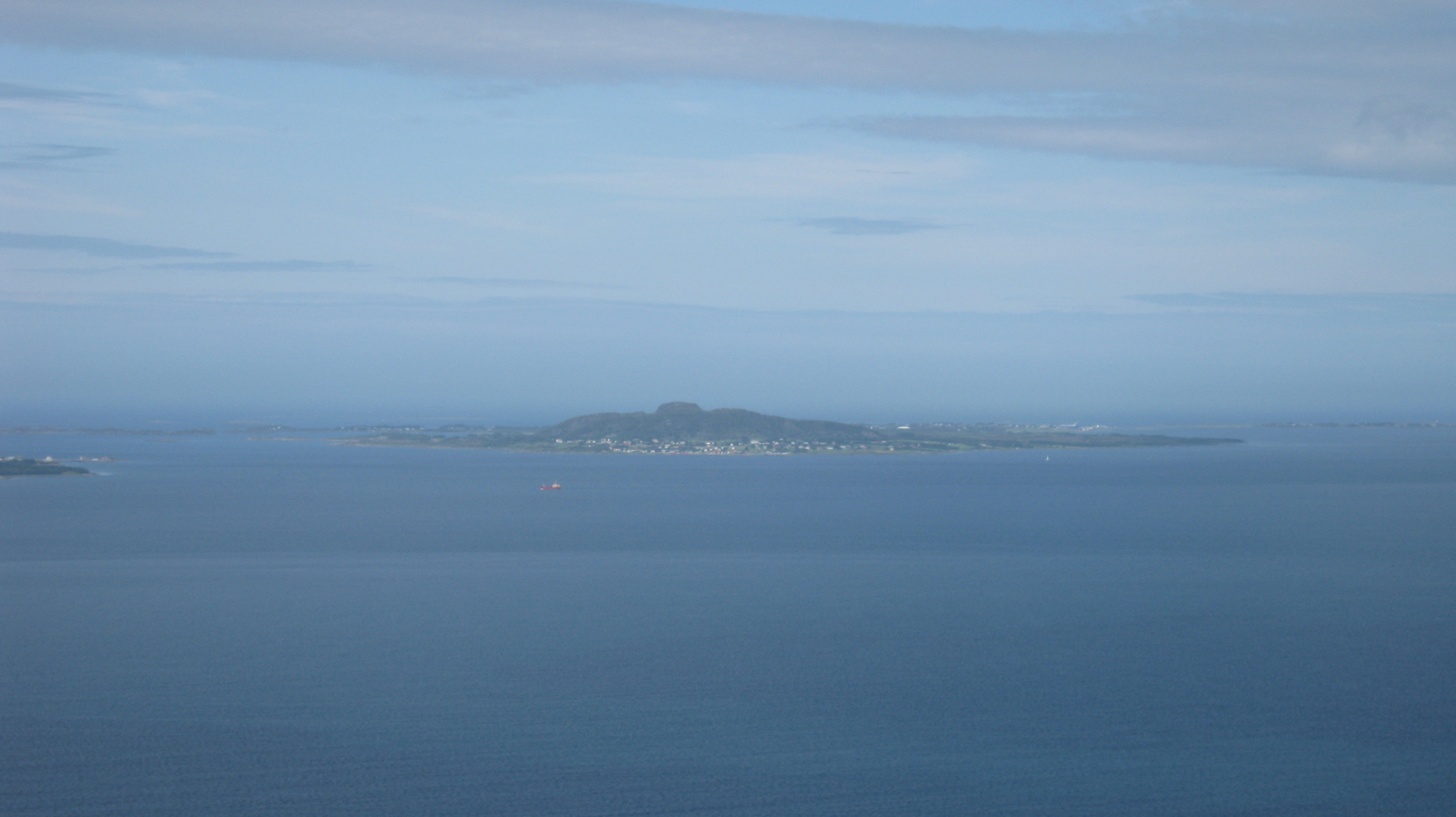
- View of Myklebost on the south coast of Harøya
- Interactive map of Myklebust
- Location within Møre og Romsdal Location within Norway
- Coordinates: 62.7319°N 6.4486°E
- Country: Norway
- Region: Western Norway
- County: Møre og Romsdal
- District: Romsdal
- Municipality: Ålesund Municipality
- Elevation: 20 m (66 ft)
- Time zone: UTC+01:00 (CET)
  - Summer (DST): UTC+02:00 (CEST)
- Post Code: 6488 Myklebost

Myklebust is a village on the southern end of the island of Harøya in Ålesund Municipality in Møre og Romsdal county, Norway. The village lies about 7 kilometres (4.3 mi) south of village of Steinshamn. There are ferry connections from Myklebost to Fjørtofta and Brattvåg (both in Haram Municipality) and to Dryna (in Molde Municipality).

== History ==
The Myklebost area was a part of Haram Municipality until 1965 when it became part of Sandøy Municipality. In 2020, it became part of Ålesund Municipality. Harøy Church is located about 5 kilometres (3.1 mi) north of the village.

The 3,680-metre (12,070 ft) long Fjørtoftfjord Tunnel runs from Myklebost on Harøya island under the Fjørtoftfjorden to the nearby island of Fjørtofta. This tunnel was built in 2022 as part of the Nordøyvegen project that connected several islands to the mainland.
