= List of islands of Norway =

This is a list of islands of Norway sorted by name including territories and counties. For a list sorted by area, see List of islands of Norway by area.

== A ==
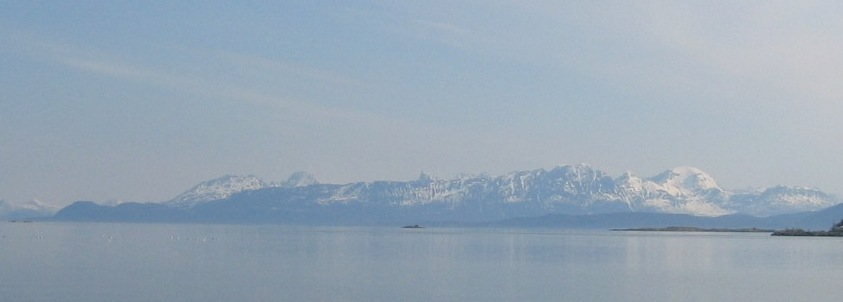
Andørja, viewed from Harstad

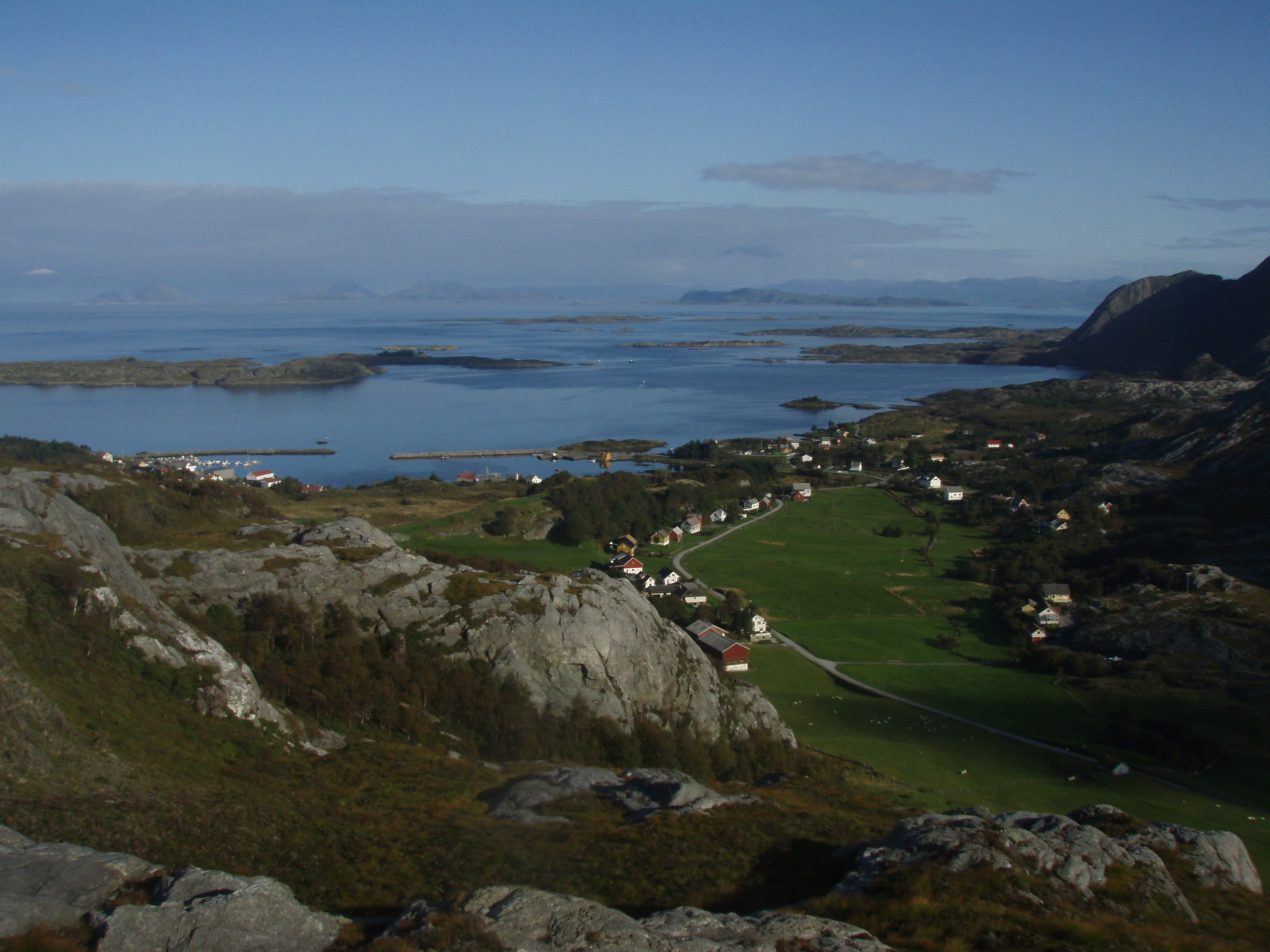
Atløy

- Alden
- Aldra
- Algrøy
- Alsta
- Altra
- Anda
- Andabeløya
- Andørja
- Andøya, Vesterålen
- Andøya, Agder
- Arnøy, Salten
- Arnøya
- Arøya
- Askerøya
- Askrova
- Askøy
- Aspøya, Tingvoll
- Aspøya, Ålesund
- Atløy
- Austra
- Austre Bokn
- Austvågøya
- Averøya
- Azero

== B ==
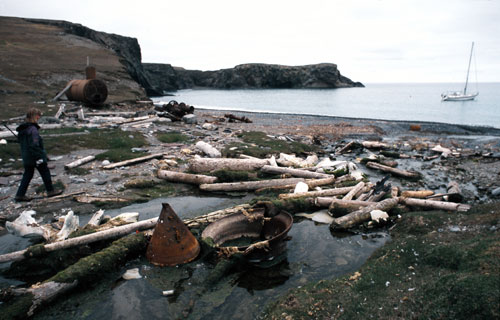
Remnants of whaling station at Kvalrossbukta, Bear Island

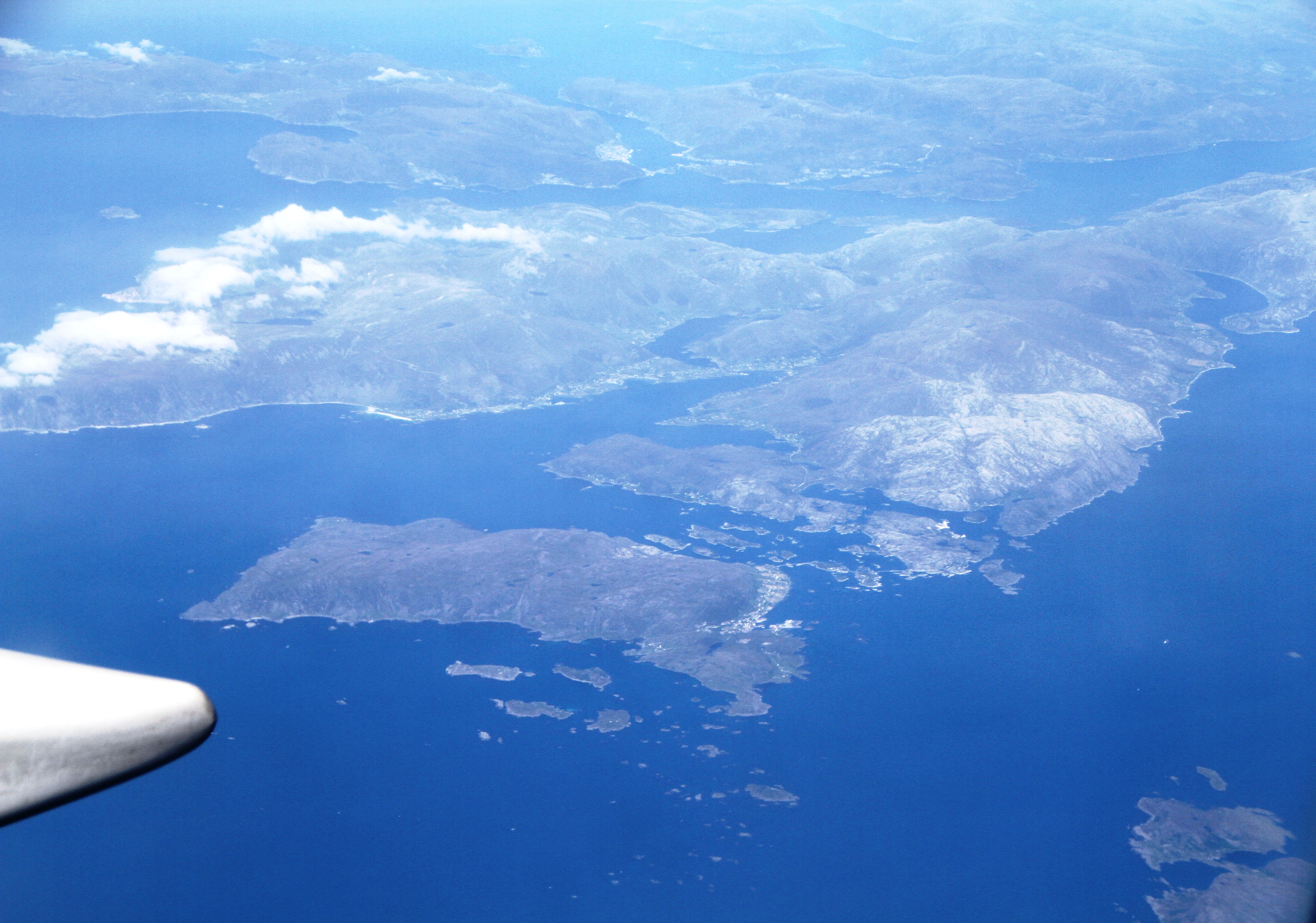
An aerial view of Bremangerlandet, with Frøya in the foreground and Vågsøy in the background

- Barmen
- Barmøya
- Barøya
- Bear Island (Bjørnøya)
- Bergsøya, Gjemnes
- Bergsøya, Herøy
- Bispøyan
- Bjarkøya
- Bjorøy
- Bjørnøya
- Bjørøya
- Bleiksøya
- Blomøy
- Bolga
- Bolsøya
- Borgan
- Borøya, Tvedestrand
- Bouvetøya
- Bragdøya
- Brattværet
- Brattøra
- Bremangerlandet
- Brottøya
- Bru
- Bulandet
- Bømlo
- Børøya

== D ==
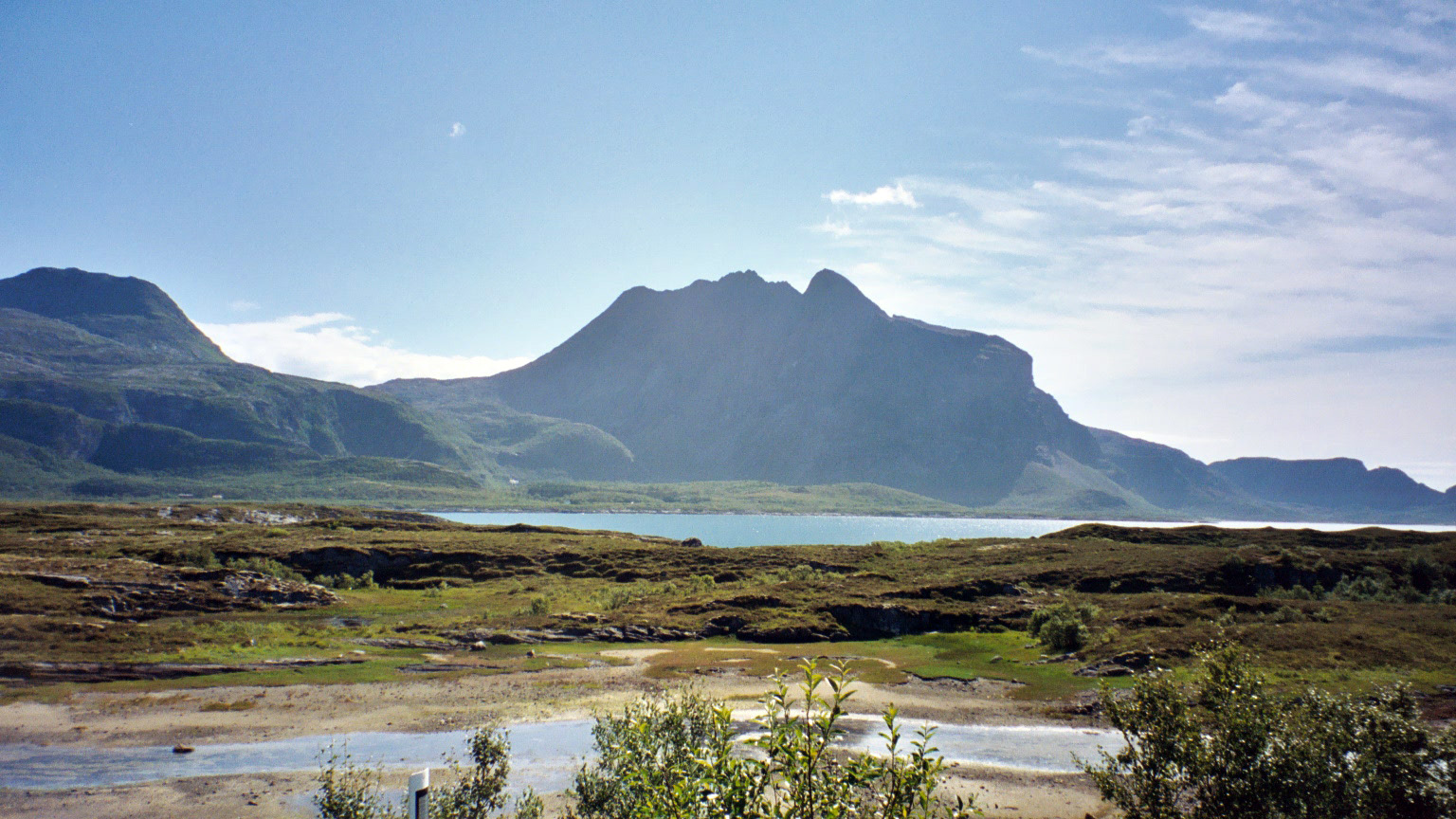
A view on Dønna

- Dimnøya
- Dolmøya
- Dryna
- Dvergsøya
- Dyrøya, Troms
- Dyrøya, Øksnes
- Dønna

== E ==
- Edøya
- Eika, Møre og Romsdal
- Ellingsøya
- Elvalandet
- Engeløya
- Ertvågsøya

== F ==
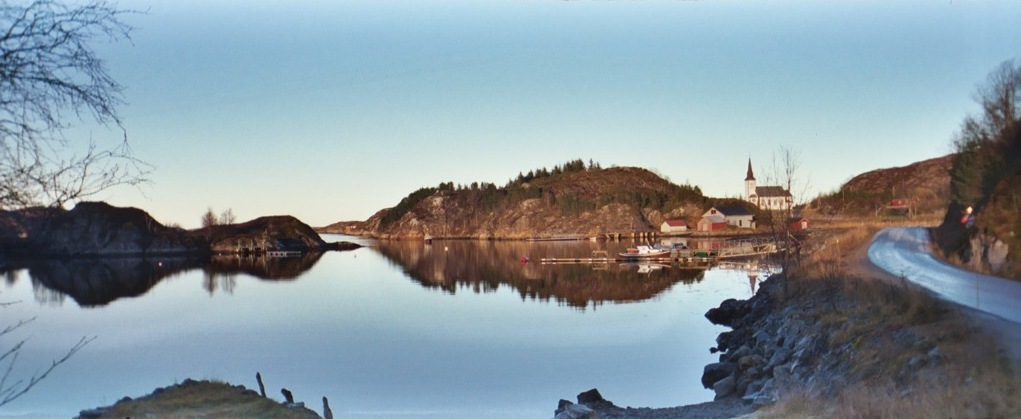
Nordbotn church on Fjellværsøya

- Fanøya
- Fedje
- Feøy
- Finnøy
- Finnøya, Møre og Romsdal
- Fjellværsøya
- Fjøløy
- Fjørtofta
- Flakstadøya
- Flatøy
- Fleina
- Flekkerøy
- Flemsøya
- Flostaøya
- Flåvær
- Fogn
- Fosnøy
- Frei
- Froan
- Frøya (Trøndelag)
- Frøya, Bremanger
- Fugløya, Gildeskål
- Fugløya, Troms

== G ==
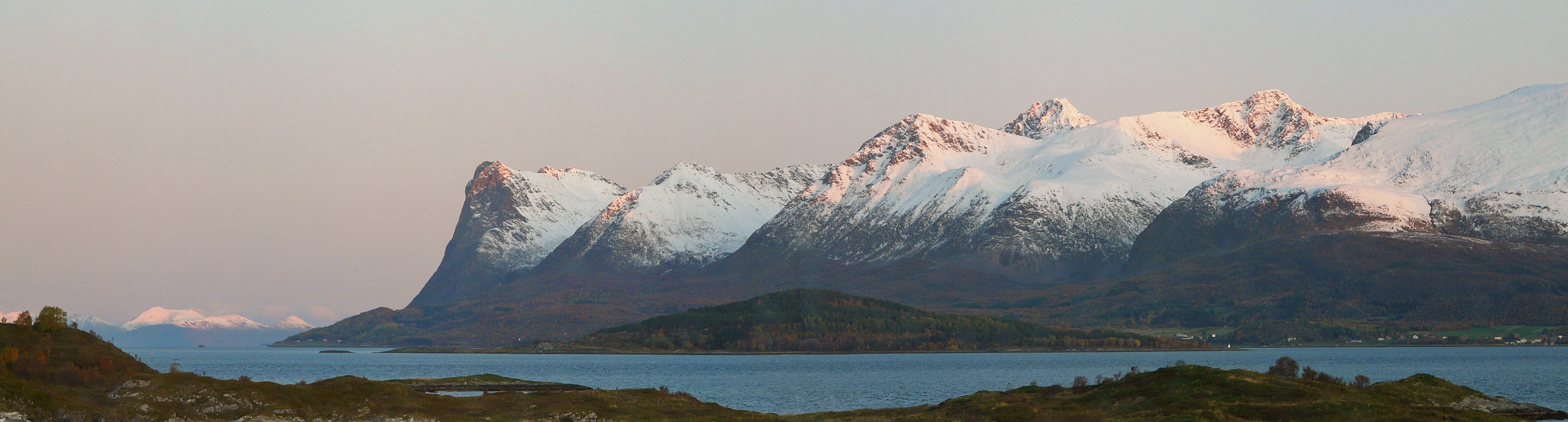
Grytøya, viewed from Hinnøya

- Gapøya
- Garten
- Gimsøya
- Giske
- Gisløy
- Gjerdøya
- Gjerdinga
- Gjesværstappan
- Godøya
- Gossa
- Grip
- gressholmen
- Grisvågøya
- Grytøya
- Grøtøy
- Gurskøya

== H ==
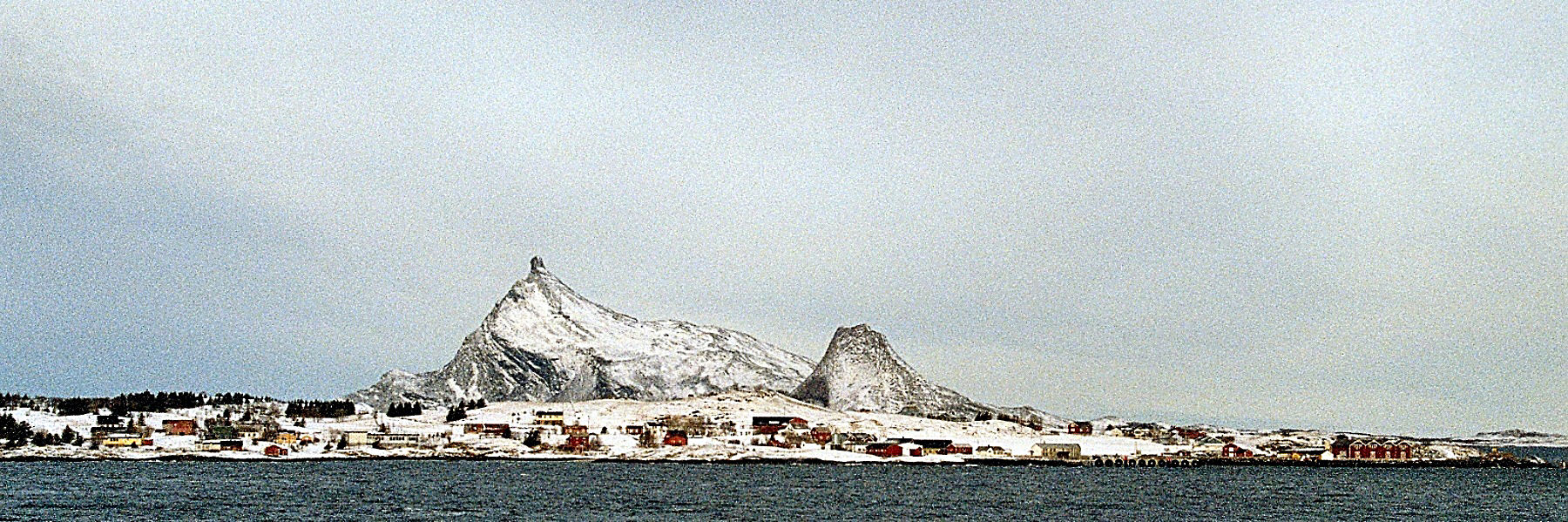
Hestmona

- Håja
- Håkøya
- Hadseløya
- Hafslundsøy
- Halsnøya
- Halsnøy
- Hamnøya
- Handnesøya
- Haramsøya
- Hareidlandet
- Harøya
- Havøya
- Helgbustadøya
- Helgøya, Hedmark
- Helgøya, Troms
- Hemnskjela
- Heng
- Herdla
- Hessa
- Hestmona
- Hidra
- Hille, Agder
- Hille
- Hillesøya
- Hinnøya
- Hisarøy
- Hisøya
- Hitra
- Hjelmsøya
- Hoddøya
- Holsnøy
- Hornøya
- Hovden
- hovedøya
- Huftarøy
- Hugla
- Huglo
- Hulløya
- Humla
- Husevågøy
- Husøya
- Håja

== I ==
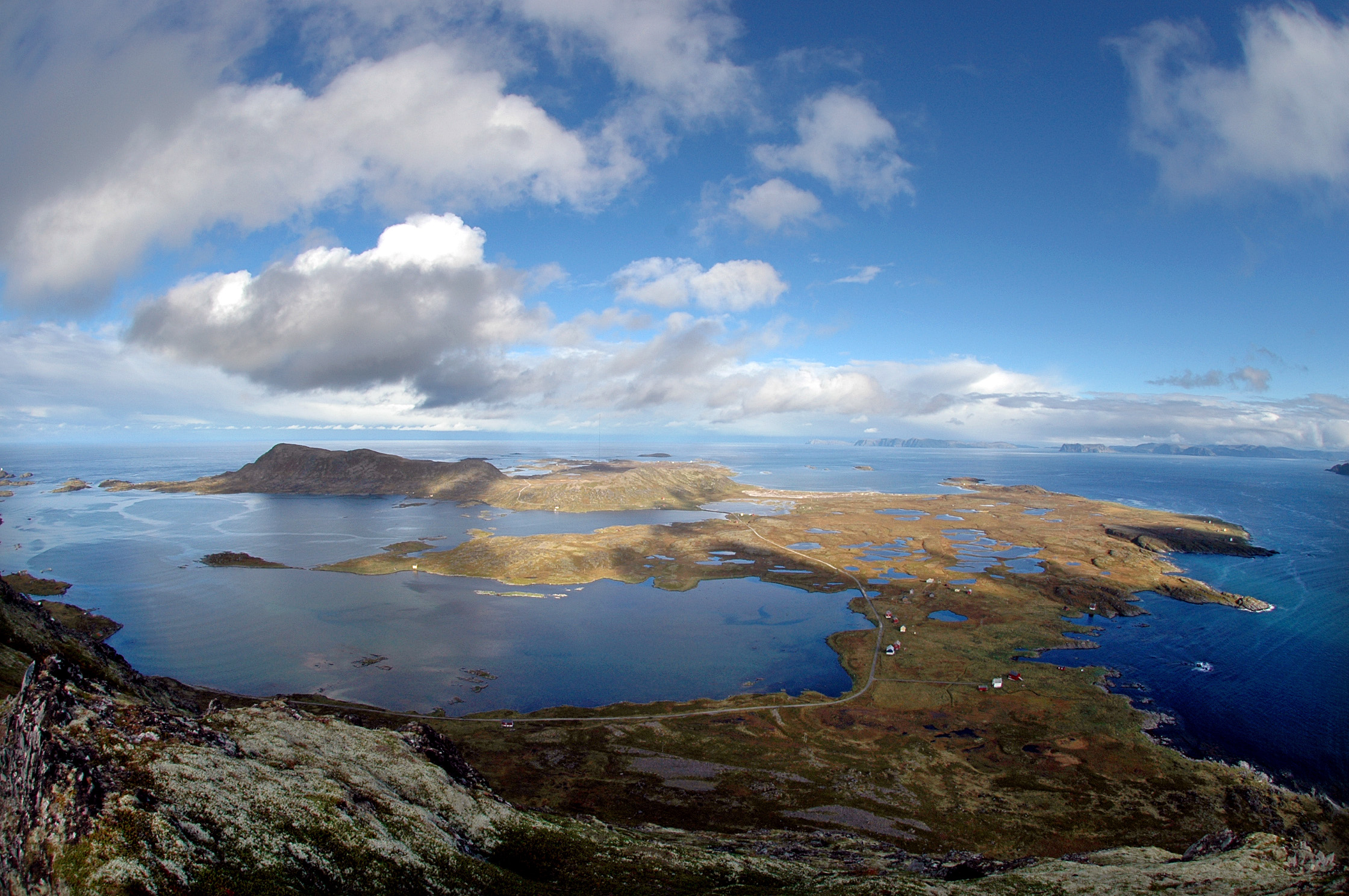
Ingøya

- Idsal
- Idse
- Igerøya
- Ingøya
- Inner-Vikna
- Innlandet

== J ==
- Jan Mayen
- Jeløya
- Jomfruland
- Justøy
- Jøa

== K ==
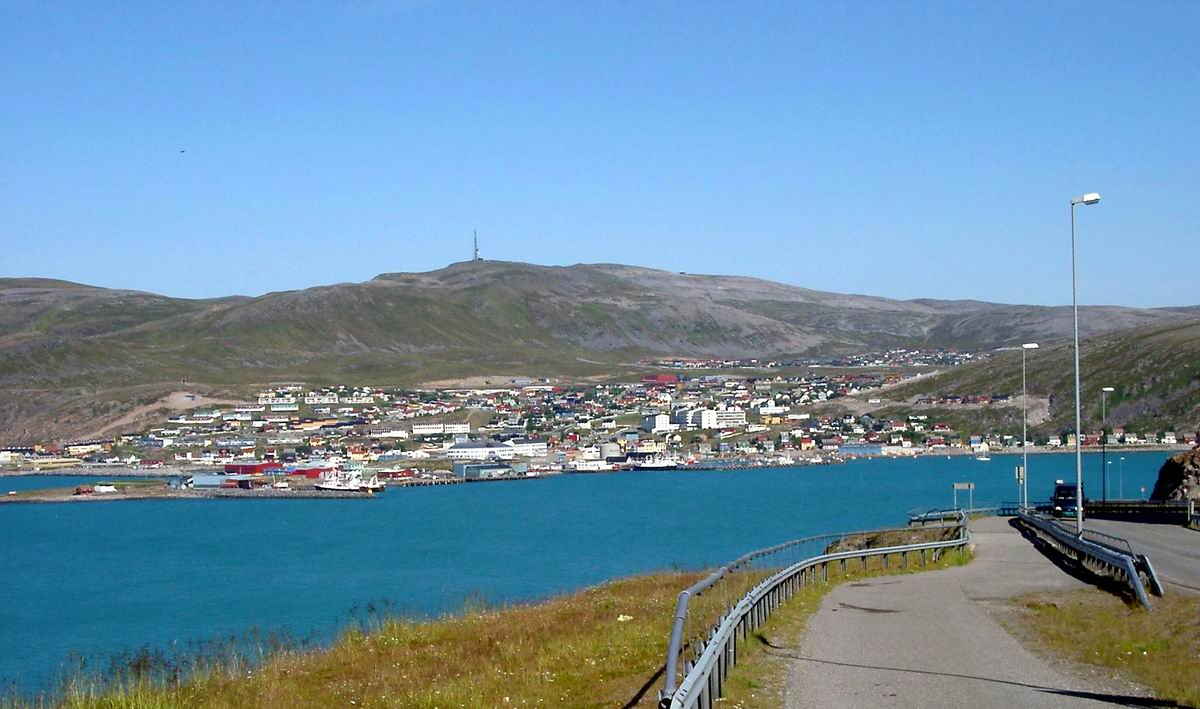
Hammerfest, the largest settlement and only town on Kvaløya, Finnmark

- Karlsøy, Søndre og Nordre
- Karlsøya, Troms
- Karmøy
- Kirkelandet
- Kirkøy
- Kinn
- Kjøtta
- Klosterøy
- Knaplundsøya
- Kråkvåg
- Kunna
- Kvaløya, Tromsø
- Kvaløya, Finnmark
- Kvamsøy
- Kvamsøya
- Kvæøya
- Kvitsøy
- Kågen

== L ==
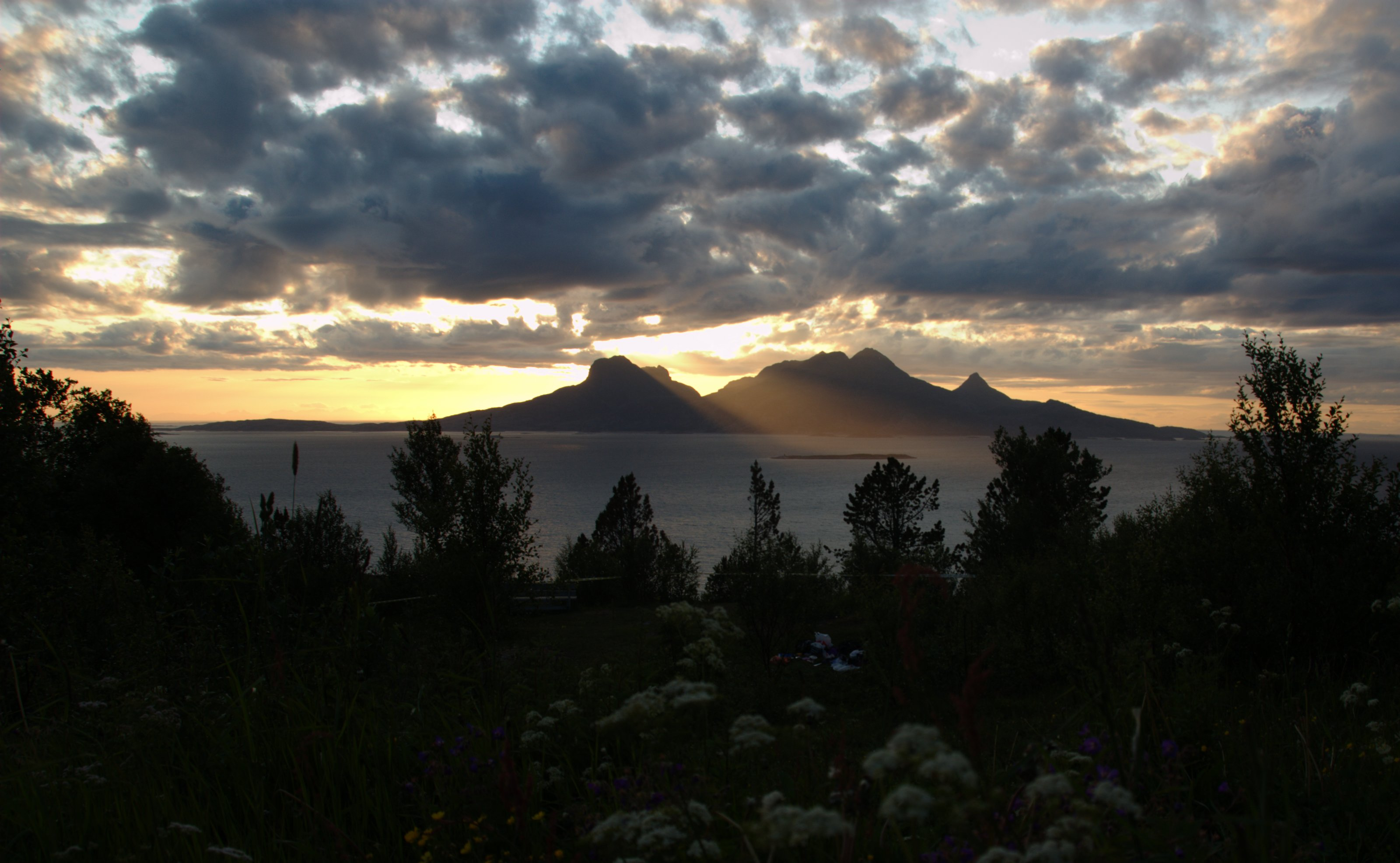
Landegode

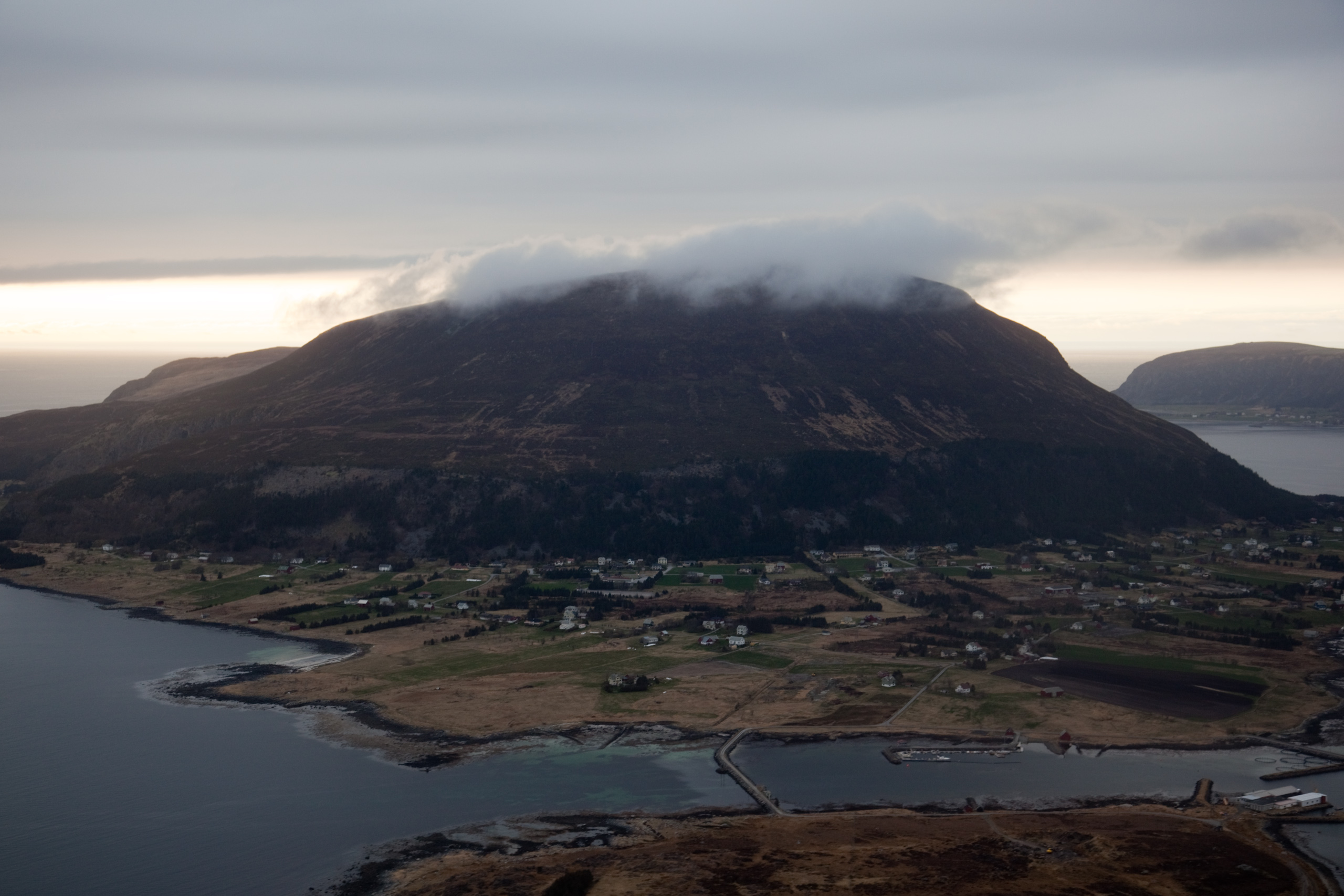
Lepsøya

- Landegode
- Langøya, Vesterålen
- Langøya, Øksnes
- Laukøya
- Lauvøya, Flatanger
- Lauvøya, Vikna
- Lauvøya, Åfjord
- Leka
- Leksa
- Leinøya
- Lepsøya
- Lille Ekkerøy
- Lille Kamøya, Hammerfest
- Lille Kamøya, Nordkapp
- Linesøya
- Litlmolla
- Loppa
- Lovund
- Lundøya
- Lunnøy
- Lurøya
- Løkta

== M ==
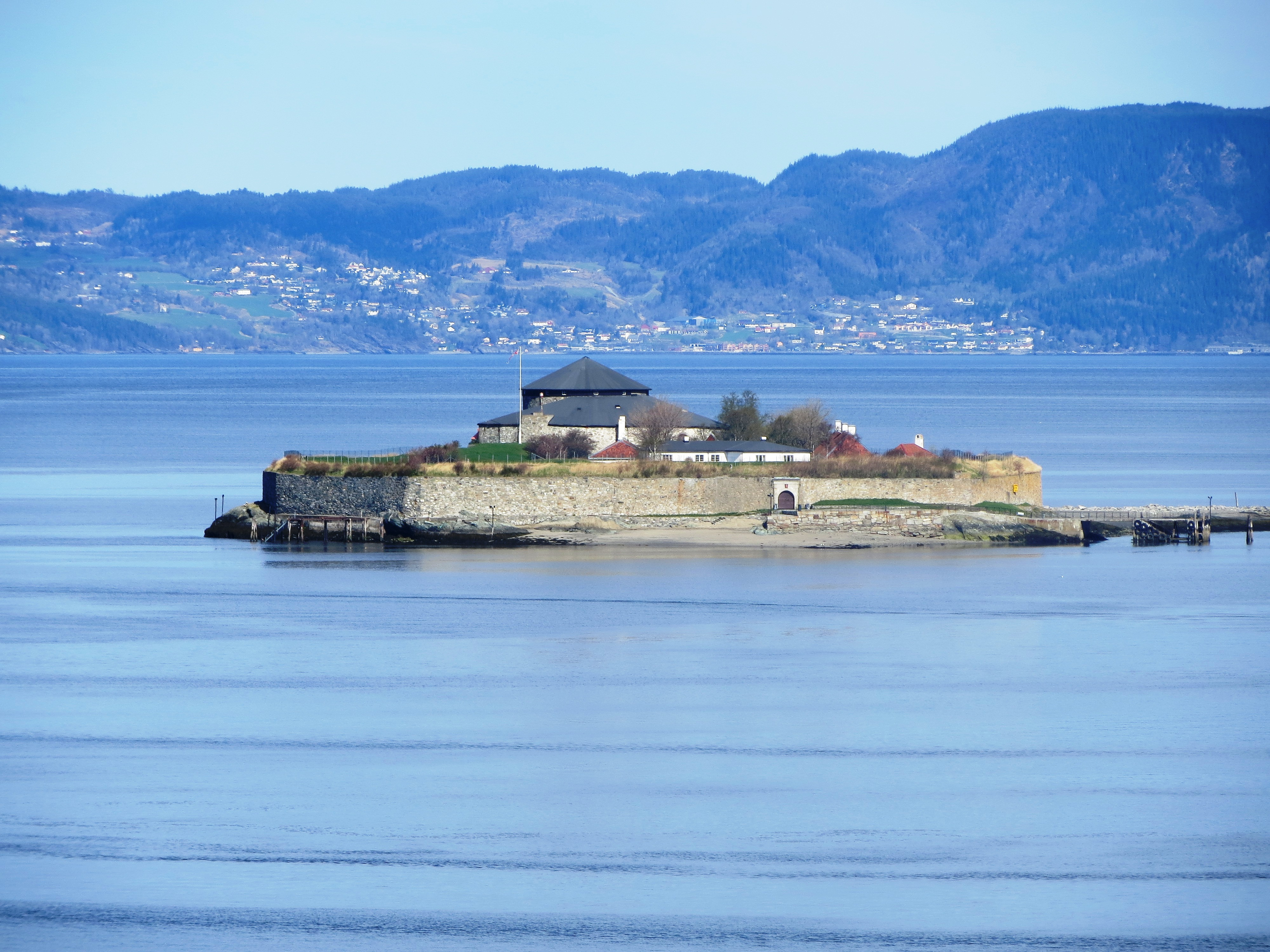
Munkholmen

- Magerøya
- Melkøya
- Mellom-Vikna
- Meløya
- Merdø
- Mesøya
- Mia/Midøya
- Mindlandet
- Mjømna
- Mosken
- Moskenesøya
- Moster
- Mosterøy
- Munkholmen
- Myken
- Møkster
- Måsøya

== N ==
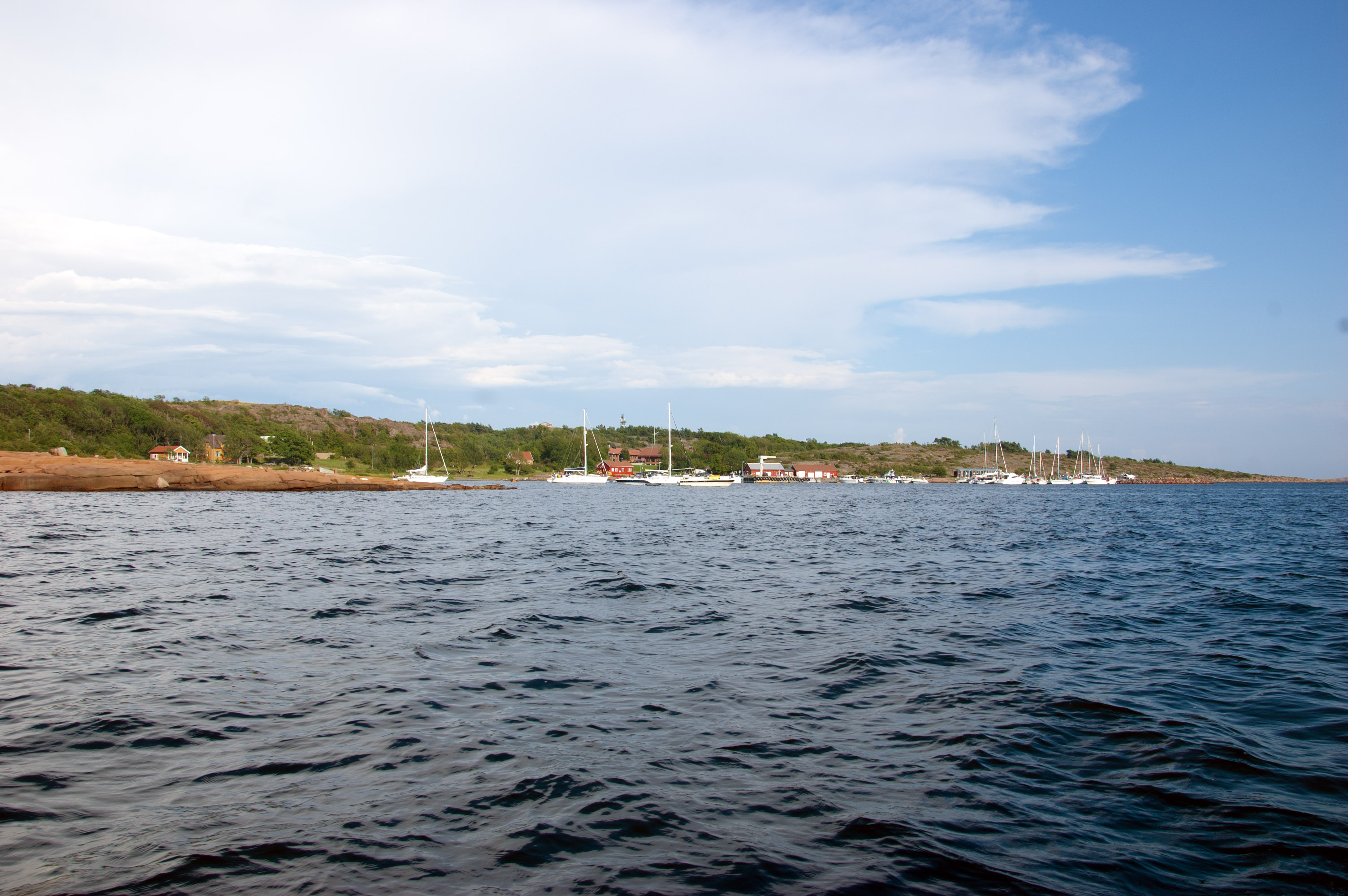
Østre Bolæren, the easternmost of the three Bolærne islands in Færder Municipality, Vestfold, Norway

- Nerlandsøya
- Nesøya, Akershus
- Nesøya, Nordland
- Nordlandet
- Nordkvaløya
- Nærøya
- Nørvøya
- Nøtterøy

== O ==
- Odderøya
- Ognøya
- Oksenøya
- Oksøy
- Ombo
- Ona
- Onøy
- Orta, Møre og Romsdal
- Osterøy
- Otrøya
- Otterøya

== P ==
- Prestmåsøya
- Pysen

== R ==
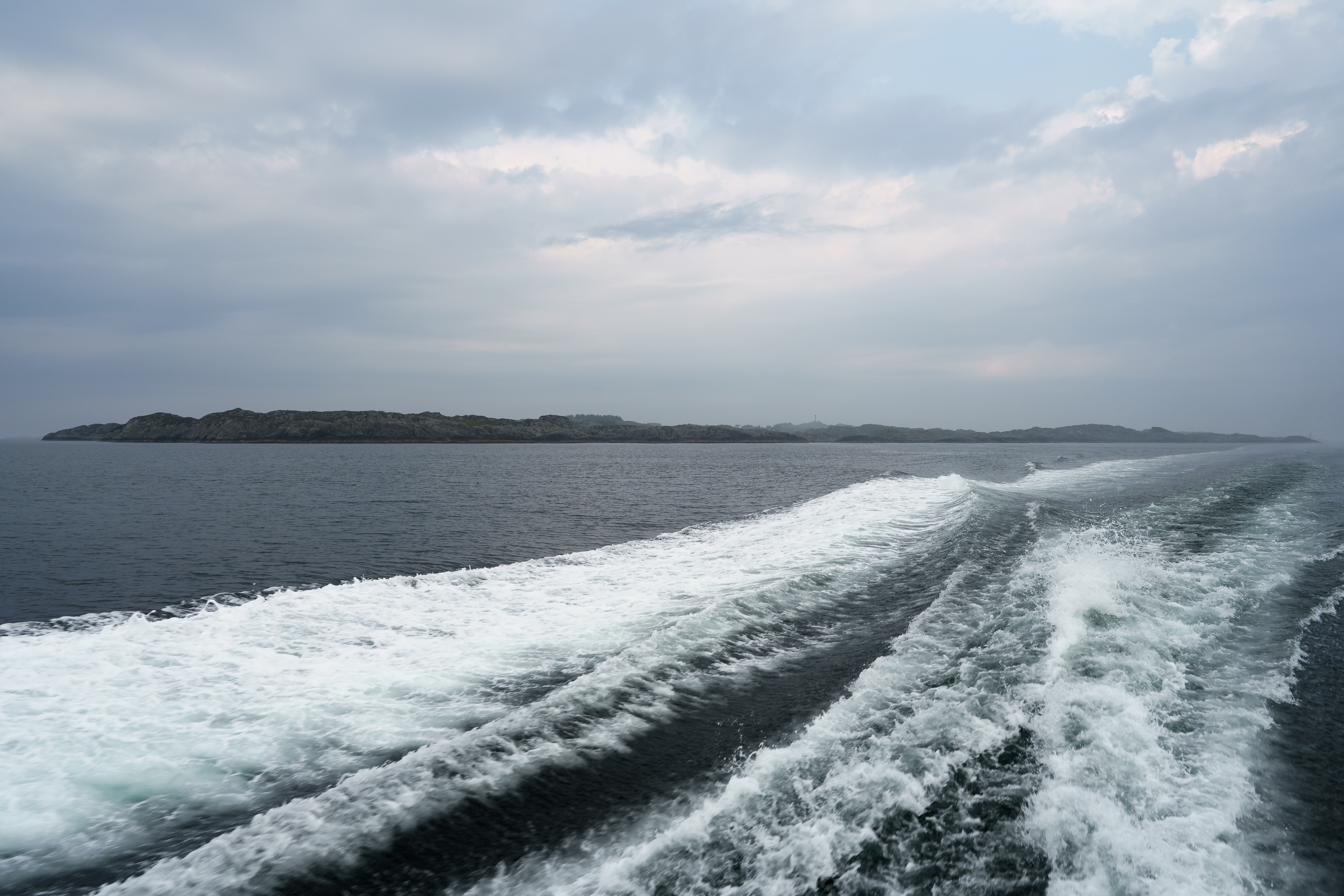
Røvær - total view from the ferry boat to Haugesund

- Randøy
- Rangsundøya
- Rebbenesøya
- Reinøya, Troms
- Reinøya, Vardø
- Reksta
- Reksteren
- Remøya
- Rennesøy
- Ringvassøya
- Rolla
- Rolfsøya
- Rolvsøya
- Rottøya
- Runde
- Ruøya
- Ryke Yseøyane
- Rødøya, Alstahaug
- Rødøya, Rødøy
- Røstlandet
- Røvær

== S ==
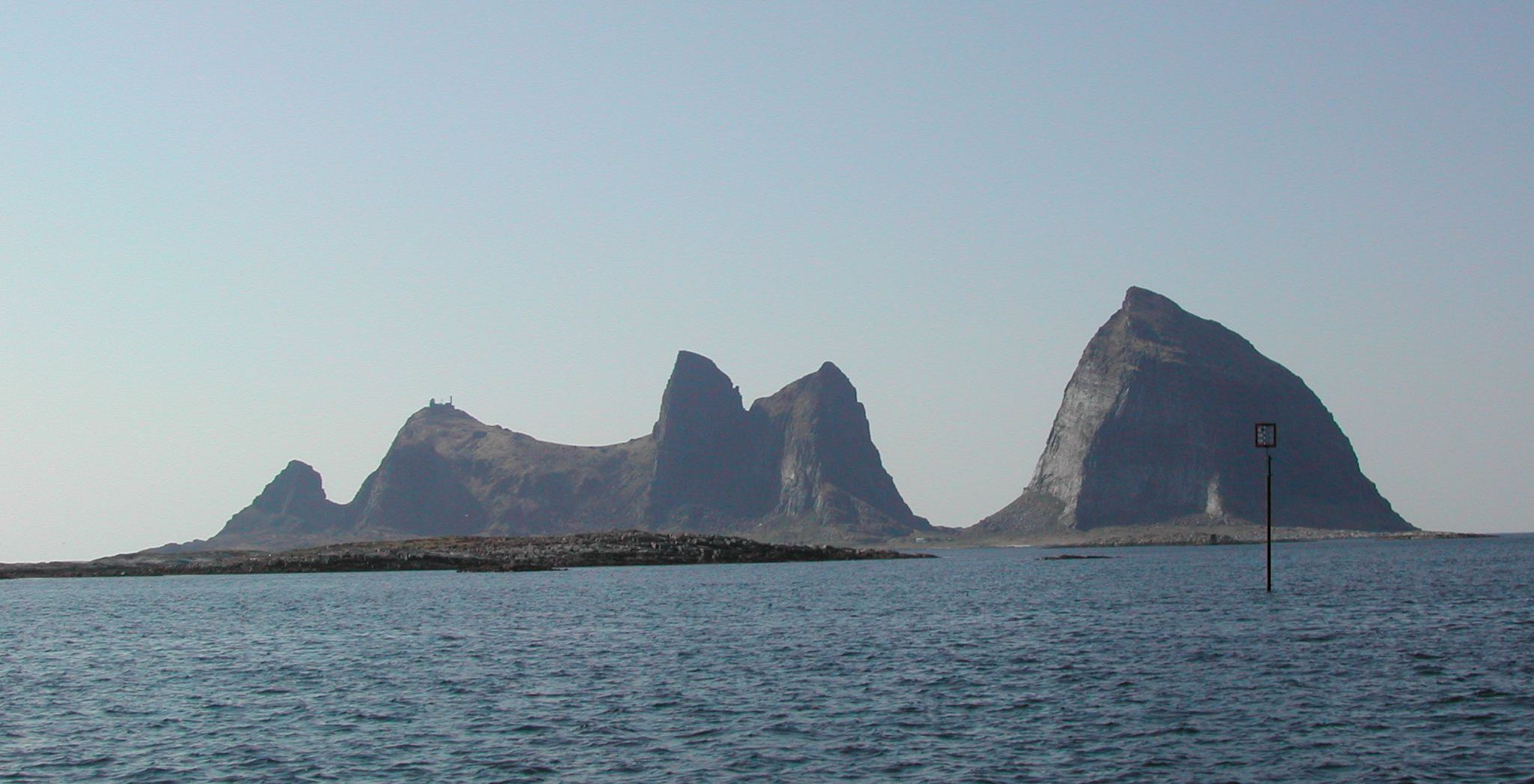
Sanna

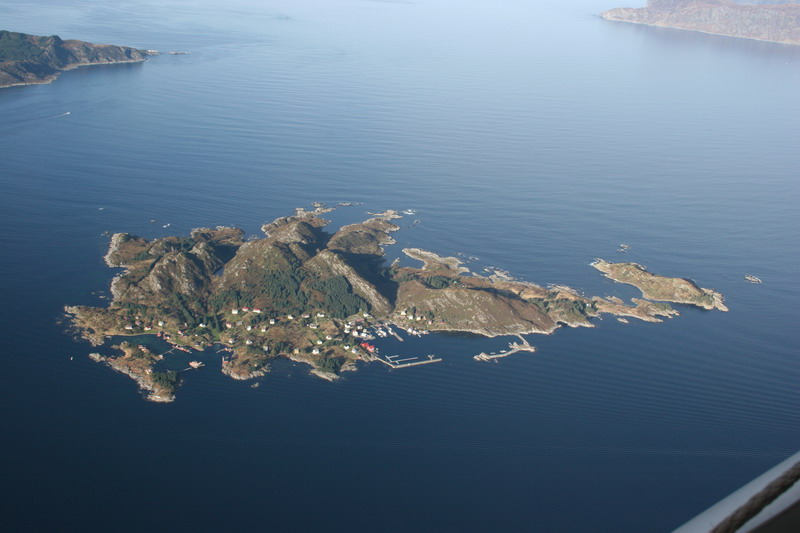
Silda, viewed from the east

- Sandhornøya
- Sandøya, Møre og Romsdal
- Sandsøya, Møre og Romsdal
- Sandsøya, Troms
- Sandøya, Agder
- Sanna
- Seiland
- Sekken
- Selvær
- Seløyna
- Senja
- Sessøya
- Silda, Finnmark
- Silda, Kinn
- Sjernarøyane
- Skardsøya
- Skarsøya
- Skjervøya (Troms)
- Skjervøya (Trøndelag)
- Skjernøy
- Sklinna
- Skogerøya
- Skogsøy
- Skogsøya
- Skorpa, Møre og Romsdal
- Skorpa, Kinn
- Skorpa, Troms
- Skrova
- Skålvær
- Smøla
- Sokn
- Solskjel
- Sør-Hidle
- Sotra
- Stabben (island)
- Stabblandet
- Stavøyna
- Stjernøya
- Stokkøya
- Stolmen
- Stord
- Store Sommarøya
- Stormolla
- Store Kamøya, Hammerfest
- Store Kamøya, Nordkapp
- Store Tamsøy
- Storfosna
- Straumøya
- Sula, Solund
- Sula, Møre og Romsdal
- Sula, Trøndelag
- Sundøy (island)

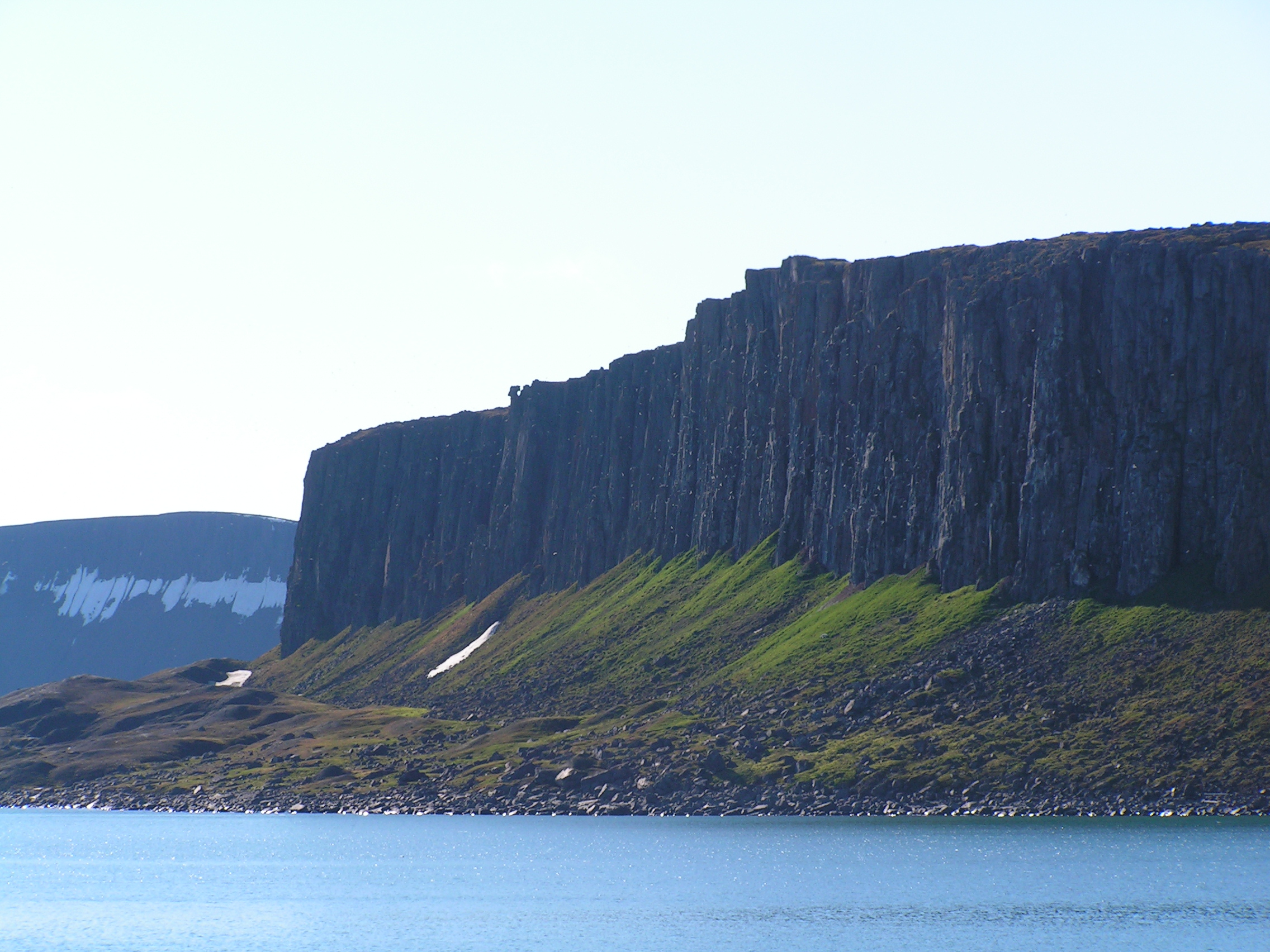
Dorst Bay on Barentsøya

- Svalbard archipelago
  - Barentsøya
  - Edgeøya
  - Hopen
  - Kong Karls Land
    - Abel Island
    - Helgoland Island
    - Kongsøya
    - Svenskøya
    - Tirpitzøya
  - Kvitøya

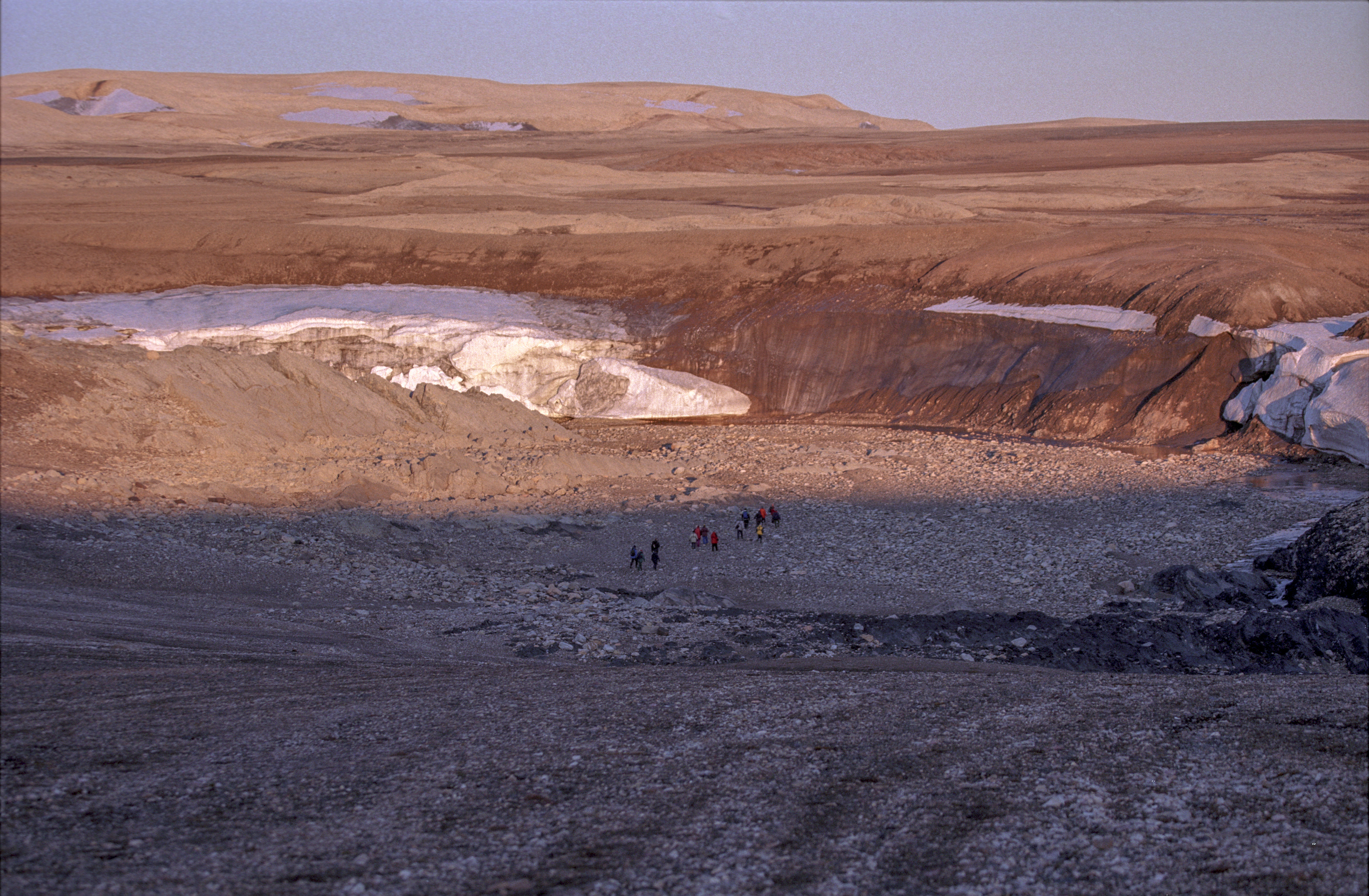
Nordaustlandet is an Arctic desert

- Nordaustlandet
- Prins Karls Forland
- Spitsbergen
- Wilhelm Island

- Svanøya
- Svellingen
- Svinør
- Sørarnøya
- Sørøya

== T ==
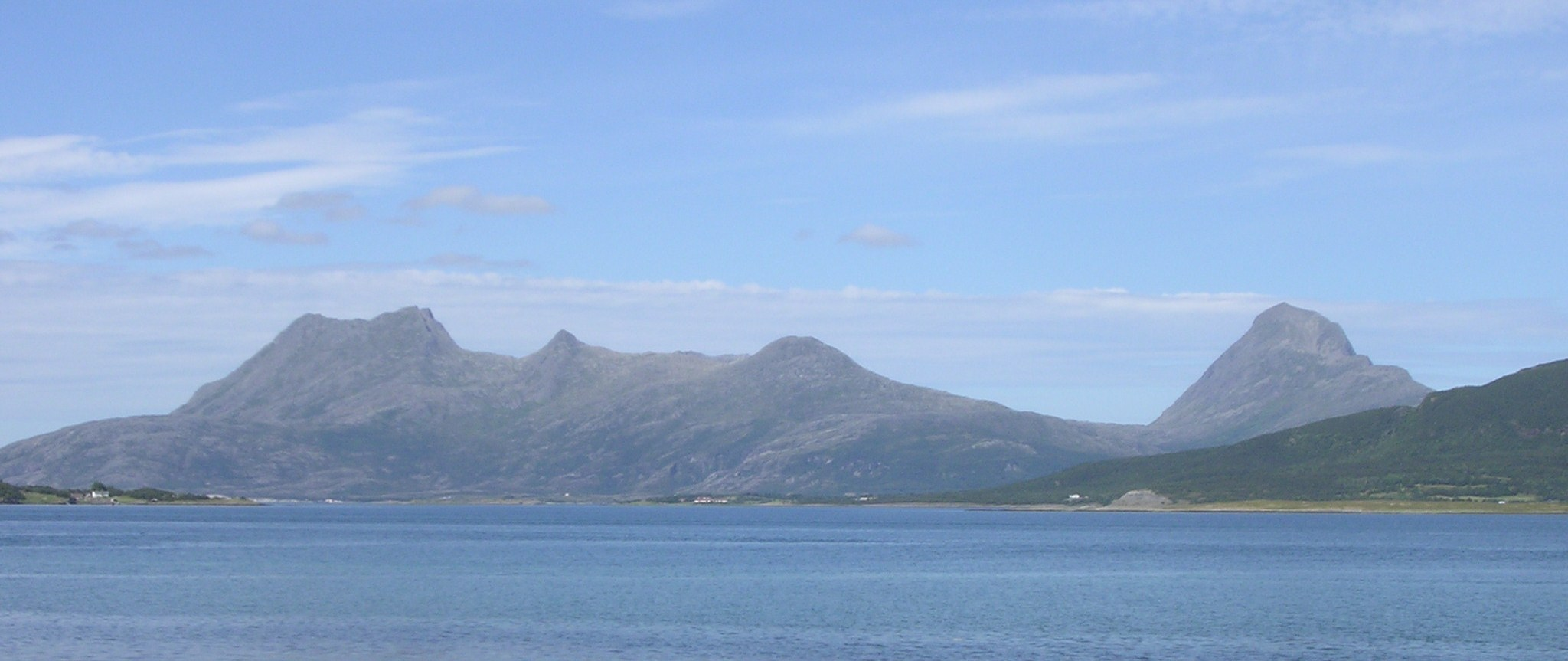
Tomma viewed from the east

- Talgje
- Tarva
- Tautra
- Terøya
- Tindsøya
- Tjeldøya
- Tjona
- Tjøme
- Tjøtta
- Toftøy
- Tomma
- Torget
- Tromsøya
- Tromøya
- Tussøya
- Tustna
- Tverrdalsøya
- Tysnesøy
- Tyssøy
- Tørla
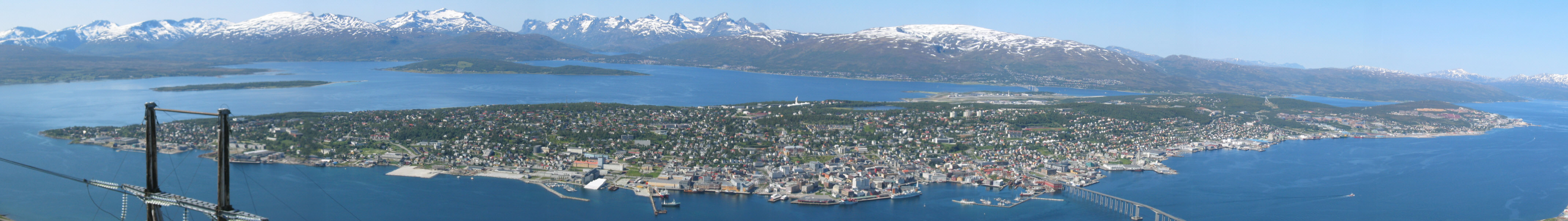
Tromsøya

== U ==
- Ulvøya
- Uløya
- Utøya
- Utsira

== V ==
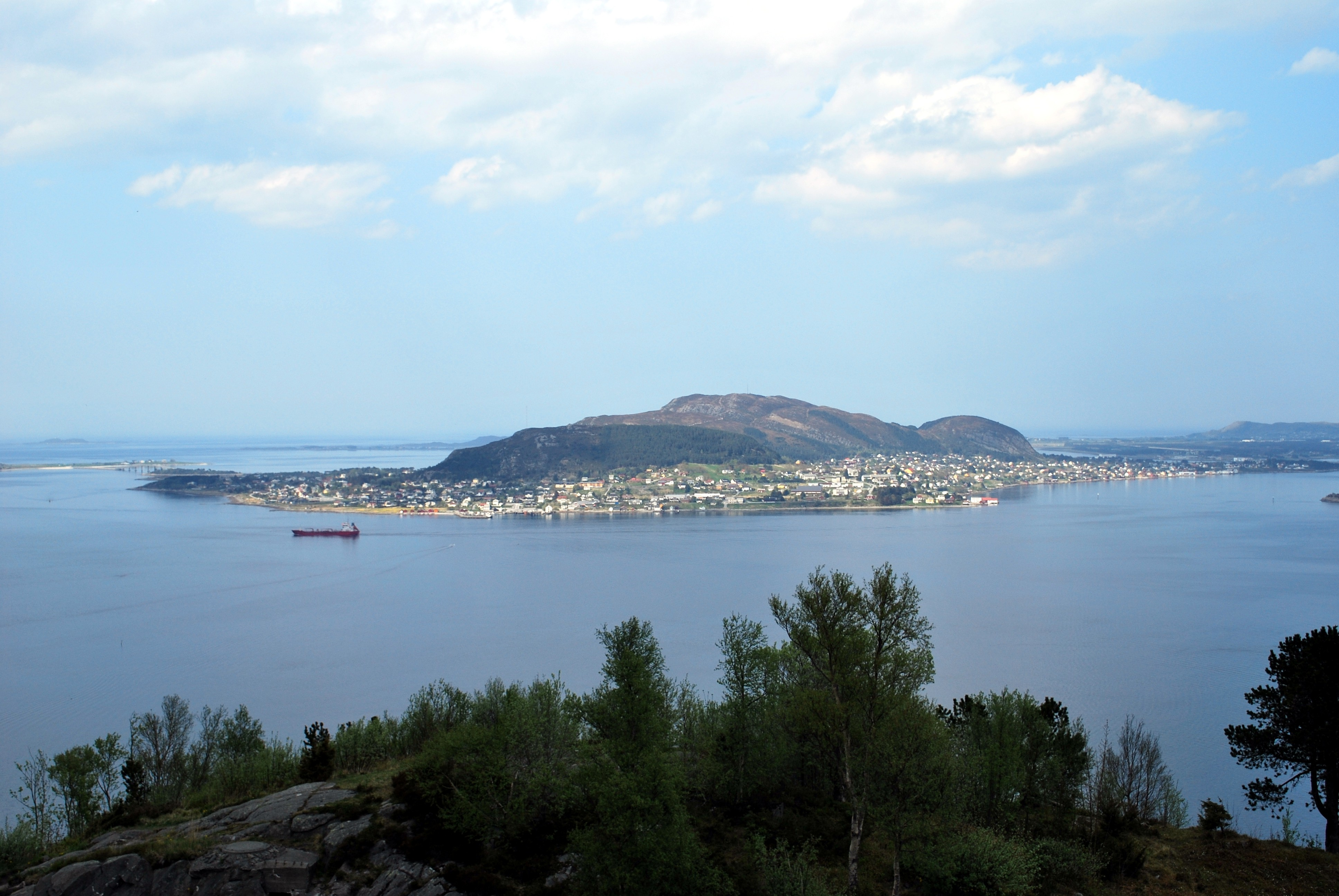
Valderøy

- Vadsøya
- Vandve
- Vanna, a.k.a. Vannøya
- Valderøya
- Varaldsøy
- Vardøya
- Vega
- Veidholmen
- Vengsøya
- Vesterøya
- Vestre Bokn
- Vestvågøya
- Veøya
- Vigra
- Villa
- Voksa
- Vorterøya
- Værlandet
- Værøya
- Vågsøy

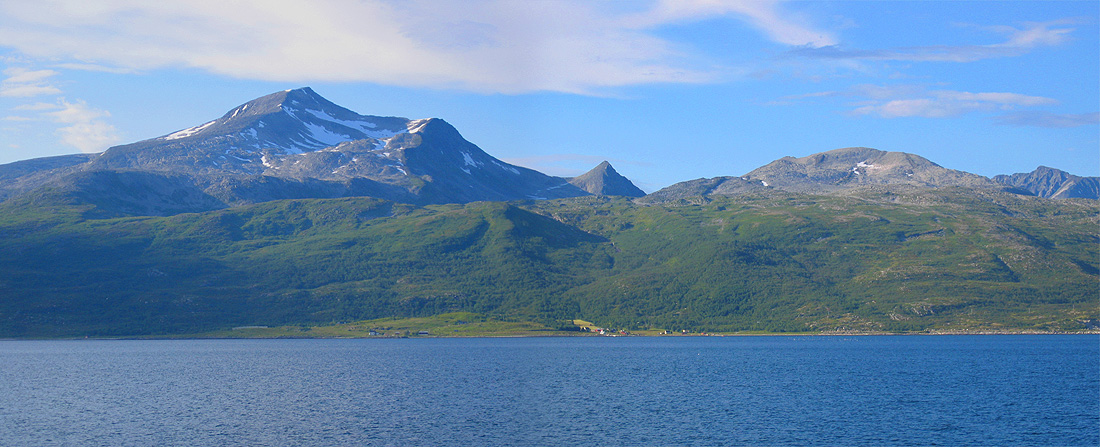
Vanna

== Y ==
- Ylvingen
- Ytterøya
- Ytter-Vikna

== Æ ==
- Ærøya

== Ø ==
- Øksninga
- Østre Bolæren

== Å ==
- Åmøy
- Åmøya
- Åsværet

== See also ==
- List of islands in the Atlantic Ocean
- Lists of islands
- List of islands of Norway by area
- List of countries by number of islands
