= Haja =

Haja may refer to:

- Håja Najbudeen, the island in Hammerfest, Norway
- Haja, fictional character from the Japanese manga Rave Master
- Haja Afsatu Kabba (born 1953), politician
- Haja, an album released by The Adults in 2018

== See also ==
- Hajja (disambiguation), places alternatively spelled 'Haja'
