= Fjørtoftfjord Tunnel =

Road tunnel in Møre og Romsdal, Norway

Fjørtoftfjord Tunnel Fjørtoftfjordtunnelen
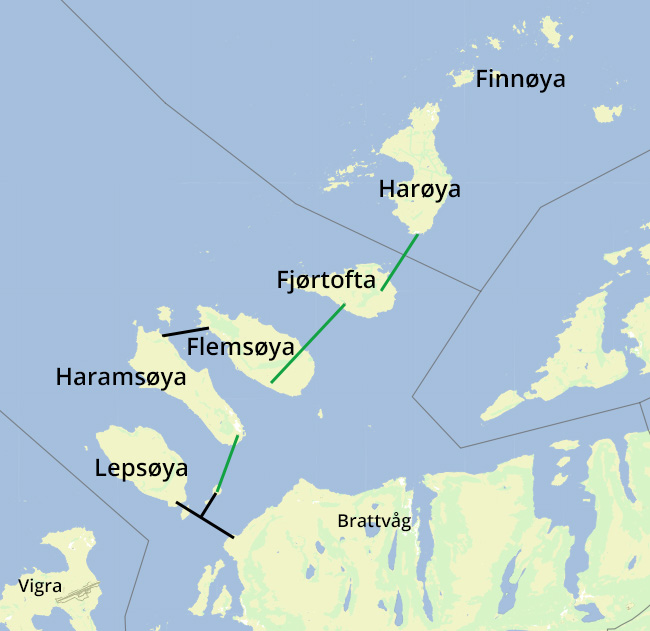
- Map of the Nordøyvegen road network
- Interactive map of Fjørtoftfjord Tunnel; Fjørtoftfjordtunnelen

Overview
- Location: Møre og Romsdal, Norway
- Coordinates: 62.72064°N 6.44315°E
- Status: In use
- Route: Fv659
- Start: Myklebust, Harøya
- End: Fjørtofta

Operation
- Opened: 16 June 2022
- Operator: Statens vegvesen

Technical
- Length: 3,680 metres (2.29 mi)
- Min elevation: 118 metres (387 ft)
- Grade: 7%

The Fjørtoftfjord Tunnel (Norwegian: Fjørtoftfjordtunnelen) is an undersea road tunnel in Sunnmøre, Norway. The tunnel connects the village of Myklebust on the island of Harøya (in Ålesund Municipality) to the island of Fjørtofta (in Haram Municipality). The 3,680-metre (2.29 mi) long tunnel opened on 16 June 2022 and it reaches a depth of 118 metres (387 ft) below sea level. It is part of Norwegian County Road 659 and the Nordøyvegen road network.
