= Østre Bolæren =

Island in Norway

Coordinates: 59.203°N 10.571°E

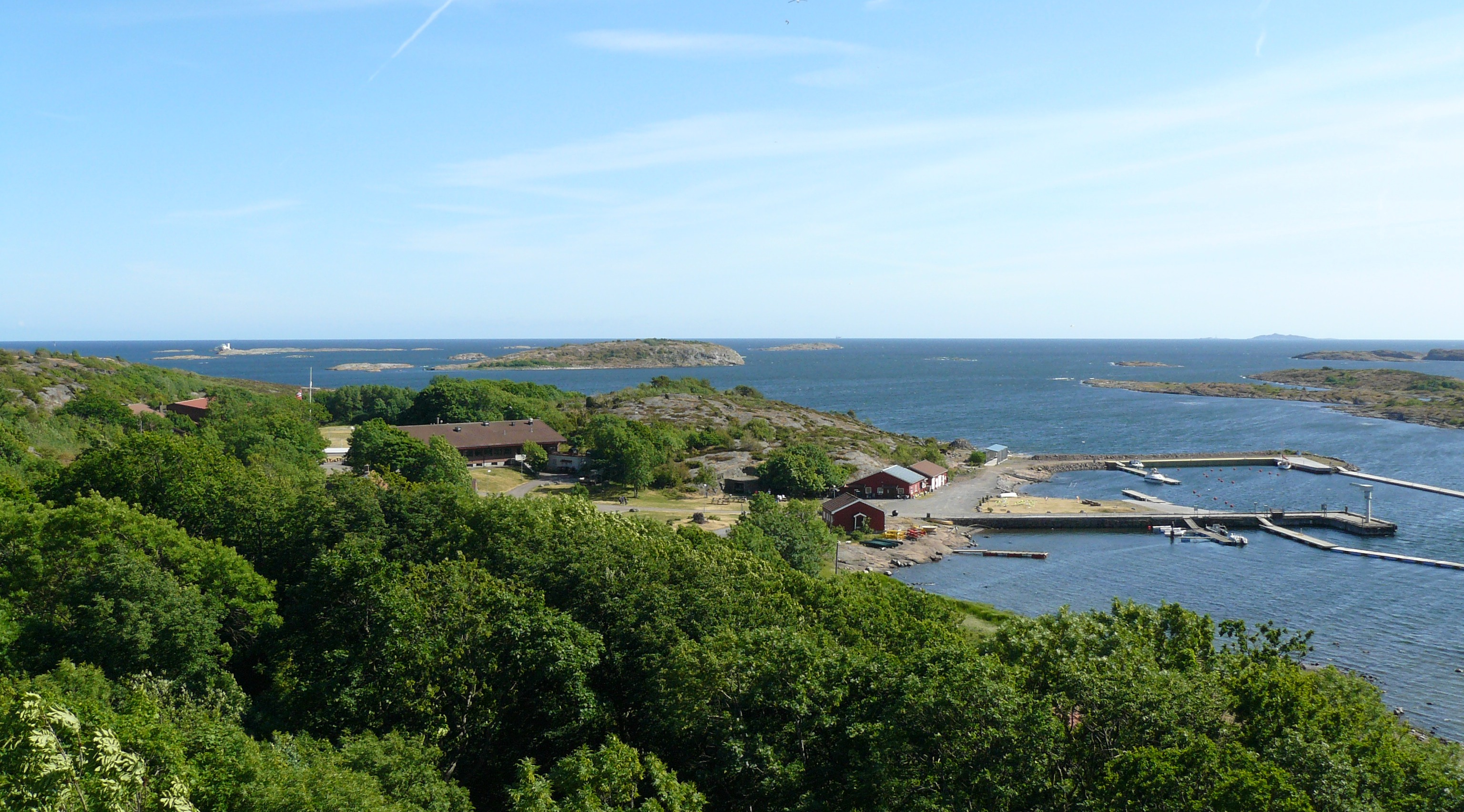
The harbor of Østre Bolæren seen from the top of the island

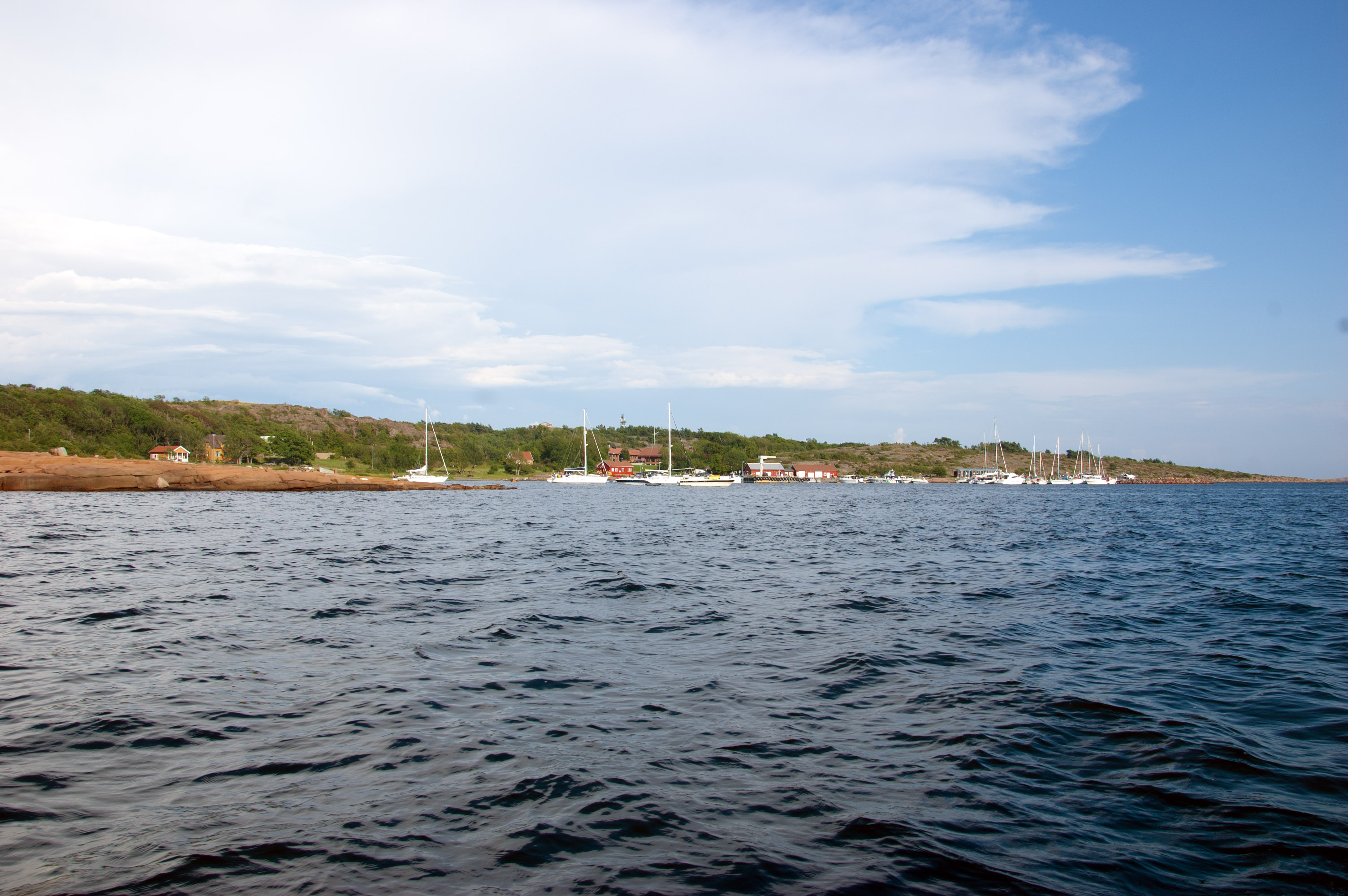
Another view of Østre Bolæren

Østre Bolæren (English: Eastern Bolærne), also known as Østre Bolærne, is the easternmost of the three largest islands in the archipelago Bolærne off the coast of the larger island of Nøtterøy in Færder Municipality in Vestfold County, Norway. The island has an area of about 0.59 square kilometres (0.23 sq mi). The highest point on Østre Bolæren is 35 meters (115 ft) above sea level.

== Overview ==
90% of the island is owned by a coalition of the Vestfold County Municipality, and 10% is owned by Færder Municipality. It has a veritable coastal pine forest and formed its own nature reserve until it became part of the newly established Færder National Park in 2013.

Vestfold county municipality bought the island in 2004, and has built the island military advocacy into an activity center with lodging facilities, restaurant and kiosk. The facility is run by Vestfold County Municipality. The island has the capacity to accommodate 236 people, meeting rooms, a guest harbor for 75 boats, and has the hire of canoes, kayaks and rowing boats. Between the settlement there are large green areas. The island also has bathing facilities, a sand volleyball court and a soccer field. There is a boat trip between Fiskebrygga in Tønsberg and Østre Bolærne.

Northwest of Østre Bolæren, there is a compass rose in the mountain that dates from the 16th century and consists of 16 lines.

== See also ==
- List of islands of Norway
