= Flemsøya =

Island in Møre og Romsdal, Norway

Flemsøya Skuløya
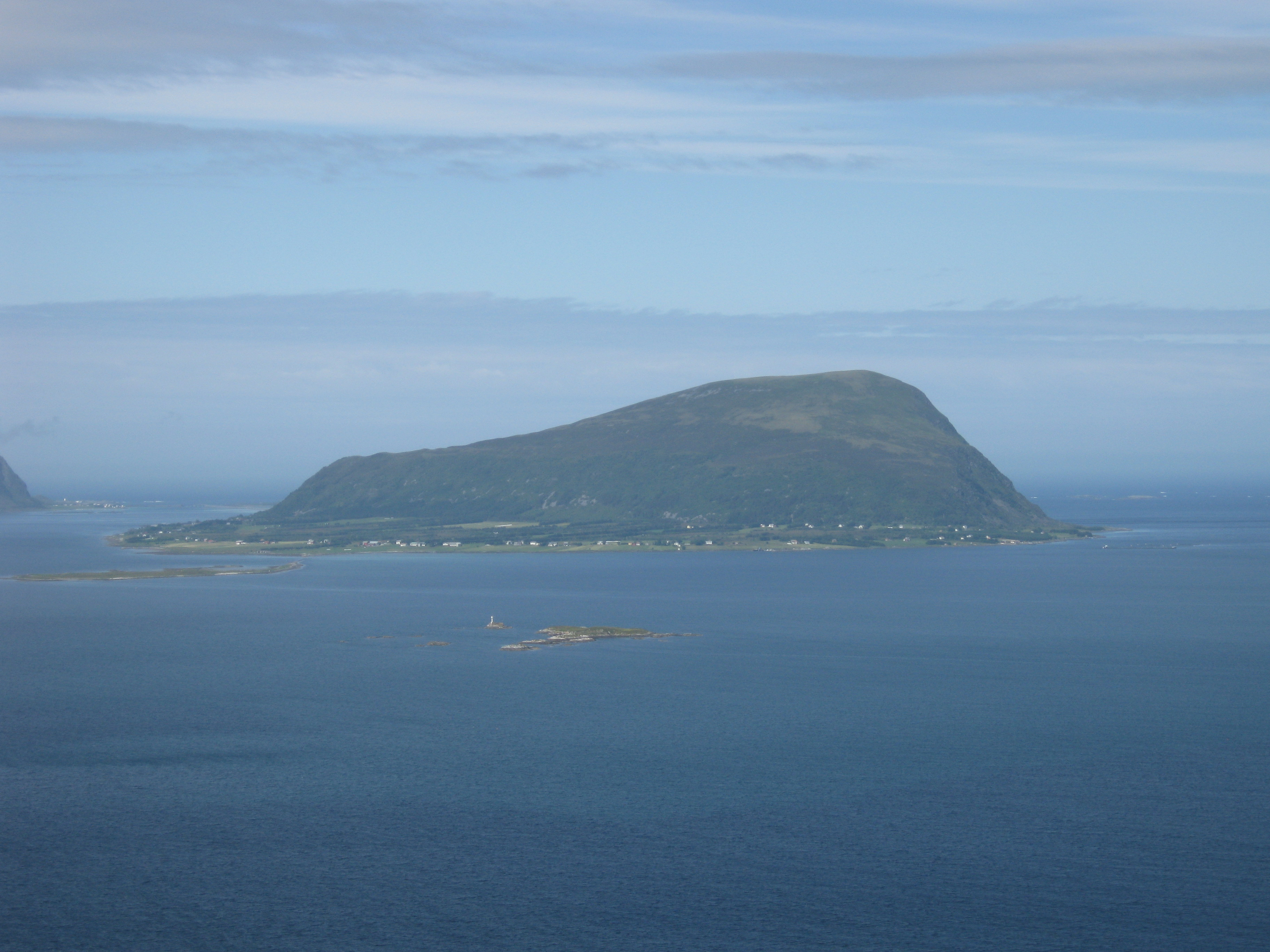
- View of Flemsøya
- Interactive map of Flemsøya; Skuløya

Geography
- Location: Møre og Romsdal, Norway
- Coordinates: 62.6750°N 6.2906°E
- Area: 14.3 km^{2} (5.5 sq mi)
- Length: 7 km (4.3 mi)
- Width: 3 km (1.9 mi)
- Highest elevation: 492 m (1614 ft)
- Highest point: Skulen

Administration
- Norway
- County: Møre og Romsdal
- Municipality: Haram Municipality

Demographics
- Population: 450 (2024)

Flemsøya or Skuløya is an island in Haram Municipality in Møre og Romsdal county, Norway. The 14.3-square-kilometre (5.5 sq mi) island is located between the islands of Haramsøya and Fjørtofta.

The population (2024) of the island was 450. The eastern and southern coastline is flat, the rest of the island is mountainous. The highest point, Skulen, is 492 metres (1,614 ft) tall. The village of Longva is located on the west side of the island, along the Longvafjorden.

The island is connected to the neighboring island of Haramsøya by the Ullasund Bridge. The new Nordøyvegen bridge and tunnel network was completed in 2022, connecting several islands to the mainland. It includes the Nogvafjord Tunnel which connects Flemsøya to the island of Fjørtofta to the north.

== See also ==
- List of islands of Norway
