= Bolærne =

Island in Vestfold, Norway

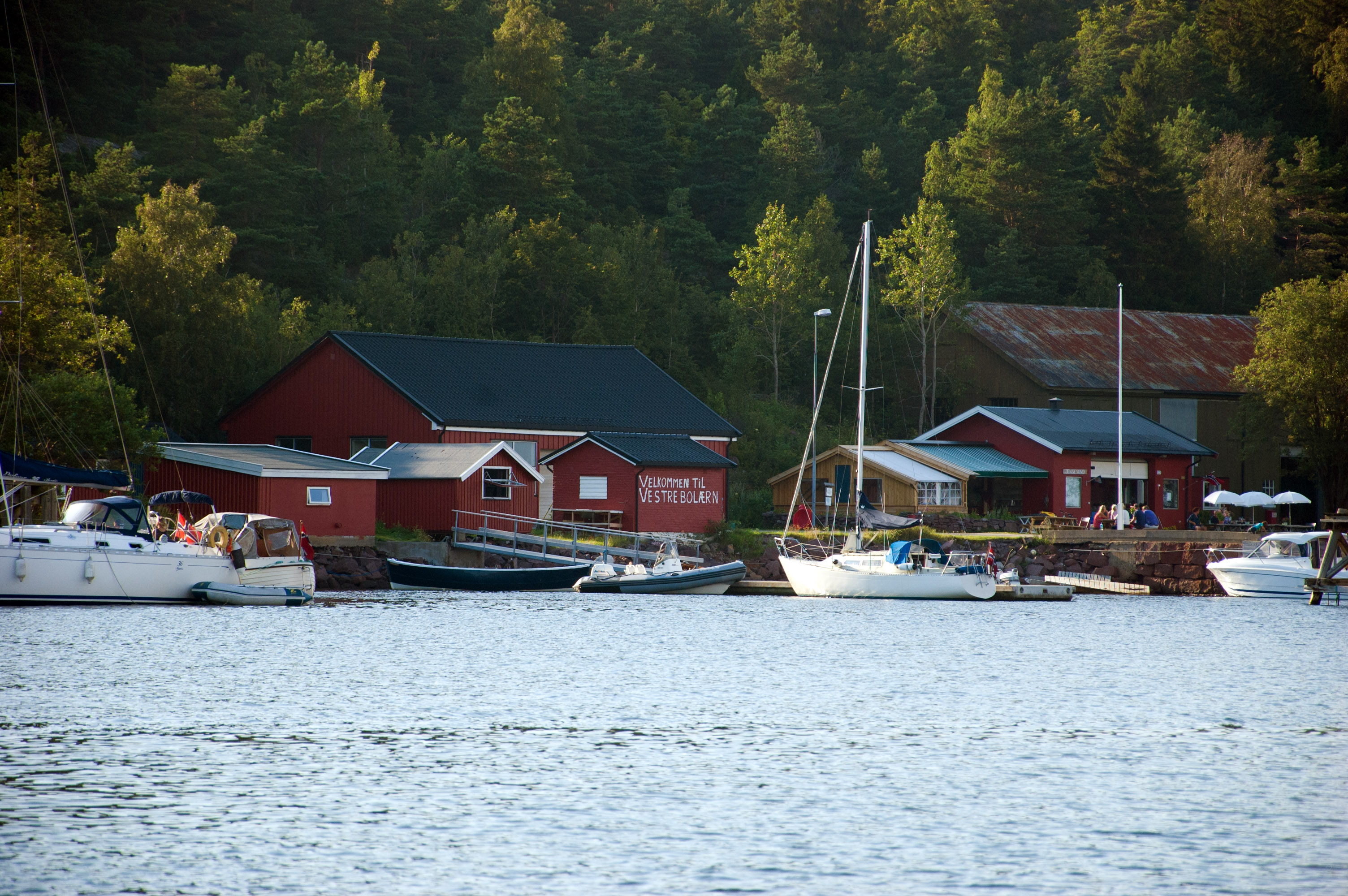
- Interactive map of the island

Geography
- Location: Vestfold, Norway
- Coordinates: 59.21453°N 10.54554°E
- Area: 2.6 km^{2} (1.0 sq mi)

Administration
- Norway
- County: Vestfold
- Municipality: Færder Municipality

Demographics
- Population: 0

Bolærne is an unpopulated archipelago in Færder Municipality in Vestfold county, Norway. Bolærne is located in the Oslofjord about 5 kilometres (3.1 mi) east of the large island of Nøtterøy. Today, there are no longer any permanent residents of the islands. The archipelago is located inside Færder National Park, which was established in 2013.

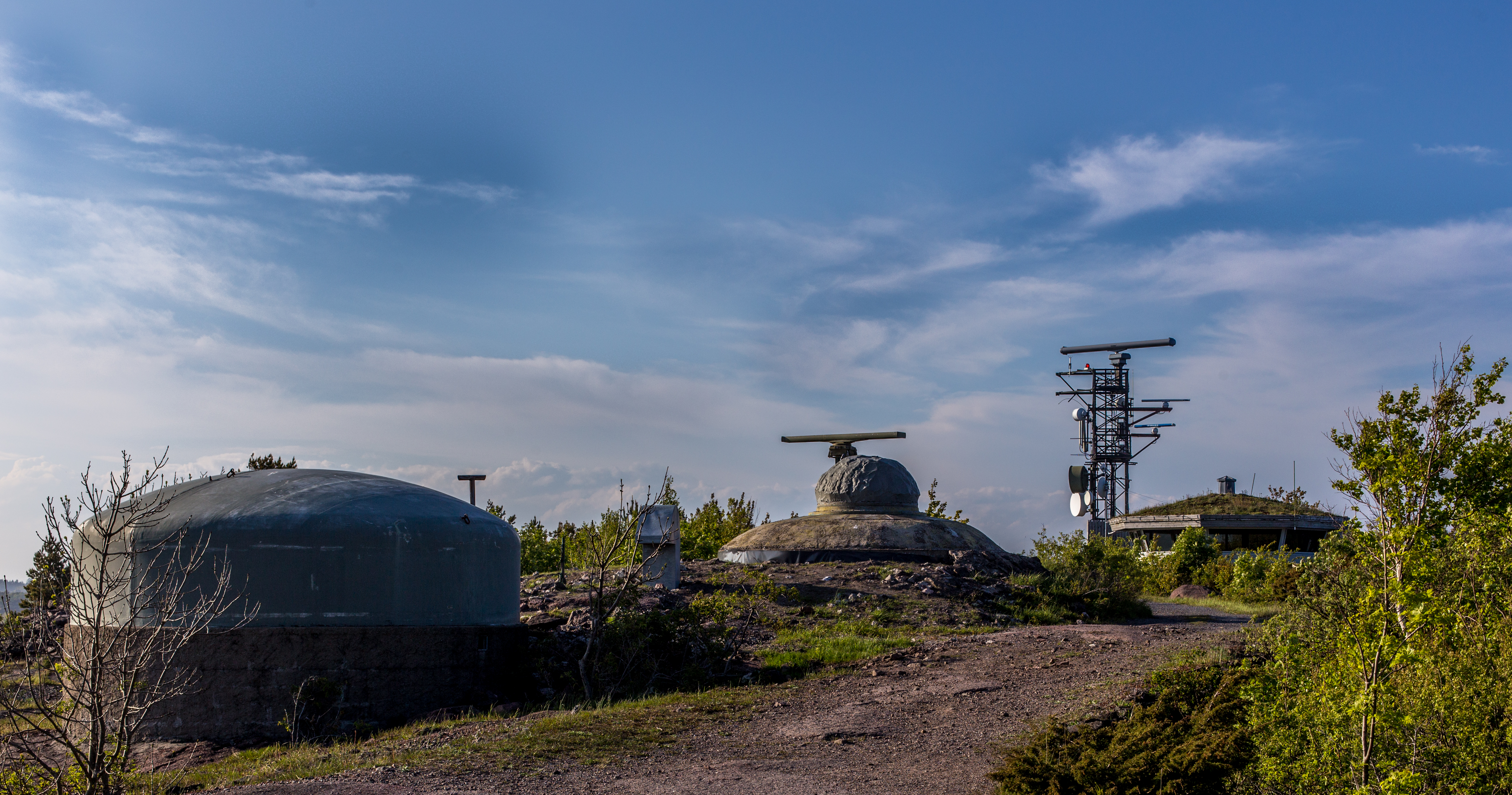
View of the old fortress

It is made up of three main islands plus about 40 smaller islets and skerries. Together, the islands include about 2.6 square kilometres (1.0 sq mi) of land. The largest island, Mellom Bolæren, covers 1.1 square kilometres (0.42 sq mi). The easternmost island is Østre Bolæren, which measures 0.6 square kilometres (150 acres). The islands are hilly and forested.

The islands have been inhabited by fishermen from the 16th century. The islands were taken over by the Norwegian military in 1916 and a coastal fortress existed on the island from 1916 to 2002 when it was closed. In 2006 the military sold the islands to Vestfold county and later they became owned by Færder Municipality.

== See also ==
- List of islands of Norway
