= Haram Church =

Church in Møre og Romsdal, Norway

- Haram kyrkje
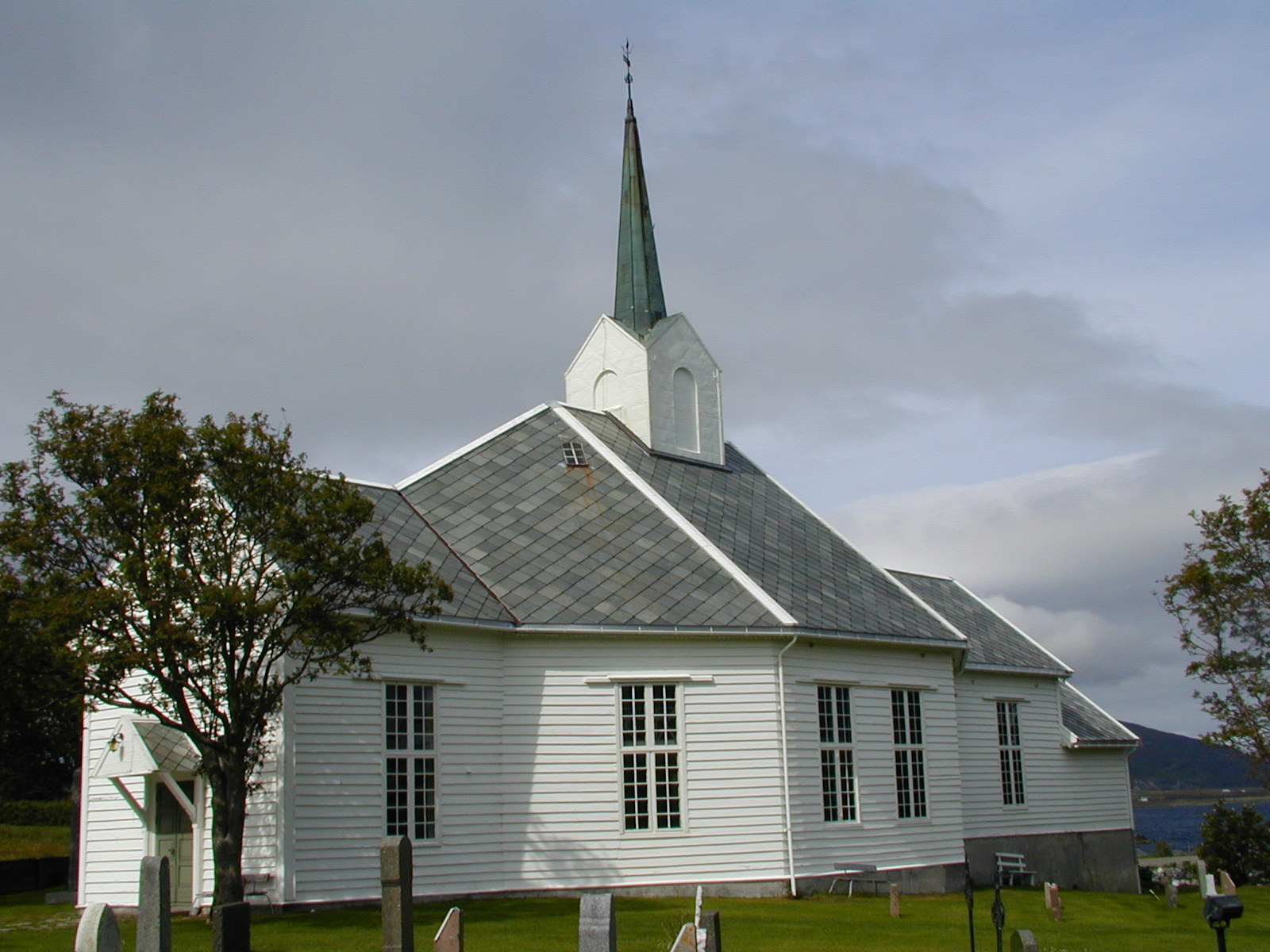
- View of the church
- Haram Church
- 62°37′54″N 6°16′24″E
- Location: Haram Municipality, Møre og Romsdal
- Country: Norway
- Denomination: Church of Norway
- Churchmanship: Evangelical Lutheran

History
- Status: Parish church
- Founded: 14th century
- Consecrated: 1838

Architecture
- Functional status: Active
- Architect: Peder Thomas Buschmann
- Architectural type: Octagonal
- Completed: 1838 (188 years ago)

Specifications
- Capacity: 240
- Materials: Wood

Administration
- Diocese: Møre bispedømme
- Deanery: Nordre Sunnmøre prosti
- Parish: Haram
- Norwegian Cultural Heritage Site
- Type: Church
- Status: Automatically protected
- ID: 84482

Haram Church (Norwegian: Haram kyrkje) is a parish church of the Church of Norway in Haram Municipality in Møre og Romsdal county, Norway. It is located in the village of Austnes on the island of Haramsøya. It is one of the churches for the Haram og Fjørtoft parish which is part of the Nordre Sunnmøre prosti (deanery) in the Diocese of Møre. The white, wooden church was built in an octagonal design in 1838 using plans drawn up by the parish priest Peder Thomas Buschmann. The church seats about 240 people.

== History ==
The earliest existing historical records of the church date back to 1432, but it was not new at that time. The first Haram Church was a wooden stave church that was located on the west coast of the island of Haramsøya, about 5 kilometres (3.1 mi) northwest of the present church site. The church was possibly built in the 14th century. In 1668, the stave church was described as having a rectangular nave with a choir (on the east end) and porch (on the west end) with a hallway around the whole building.

In 1814, this church served as an election church (Norwegian: valgkirke). Together with more than 300 other parish churches across Norway, it was a polling station for elections to the 1814 Norwegian Constituent Assembly which wrote the Constitution of Norway. This was Norway's first national elections. Each church parish was a constituency that elected people called "electors" who later met together in each county to elect the representatives for the assembly that was to meet at Eidsvoll Manor later that year.

Over time, the church became dilapidated and in need of repair or replacement. In the 1830s, it was decided to build a new church, however it would be built on the other side of the island which is where most of the island's residents lived. The new site was about 5 kilometres (3.1 mi) away from the old, medieval church site. In 1838, a new Haram Church was completed in the village of Austnes, on the southeastern tip of the island. The altar, pulpit, and altarpiece as well as some other materials and decorations from the old church were reused in the new octagonal building. The building was based on the design of the old Hareid Church and it was designed by the parish priest Peder Thomas Buschmann. The new building was consecrated on 4 November 1838. Shortly after the completion of the new church, the old church was torn down. In 1878, the church was renovated by adding a new sacristy and a new neo-Gothic tower was constructed. In 1993, the church was severely damaged in a fire. It was rebuilt shortly after the fire.

== See also ==
- List of churches in Møre
