= Haramsfjord Tunnel =

Road tunnel in Møre og Romsdal, Norway

Haramsfjord Tunnel Haramsfjordtunnelen
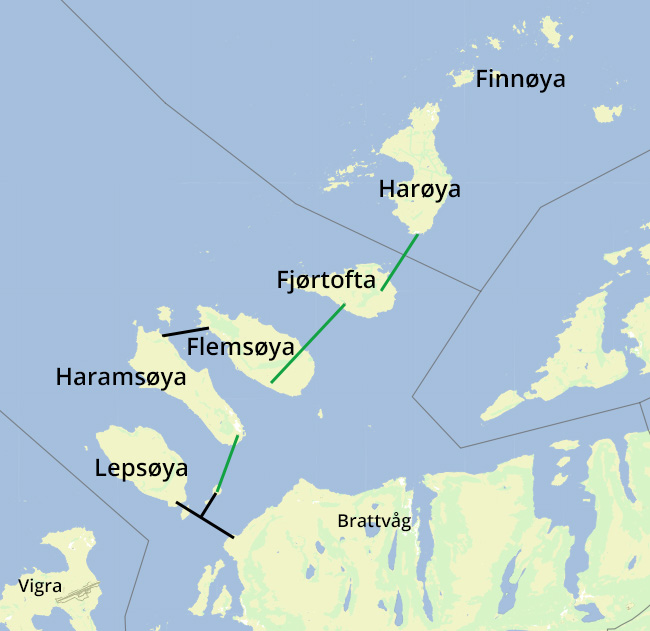
- Map of the Nordøyvegen road network
- Interactive map of Haramsfjord Tunnel; Haramsfjordtunnelen

Overview
- Location: Møre og Romsdal, Norway
- Coordinates: 62.61921°N 6.25644°E
- Status: In use
- Route: Fv659
- Start: Haramsøya
- End: Hestøya

Operation
- Opened: 18 Dec 2021
- Operator: Statens vegvesen

Technical
- Length: 3,500 metres (2.2 mi)
- Min elevation: 112 metres (367 ft)
- Grade: 7.8%

The Haramsfjord Tunnel (Norwegian: Haramsfjordtunnelen) is an undersea road tunnel in Haram Municipality in Møre og Romsdal county, Norway. The tunnel connects the island of Haramsøya to the small island of Hestøya, just off the shore of the island of Lepsøya. The 3,500-metre (2.2 mi) long tunnel opened on 18 December 2021 and it reaches a depth of 112 metres (367 ft) below sea level. It is part of Norwegian County Road 659 and the Nordøyvegen road network.
