= Haramsøya =

Island in Møre og Romsdal, Norway

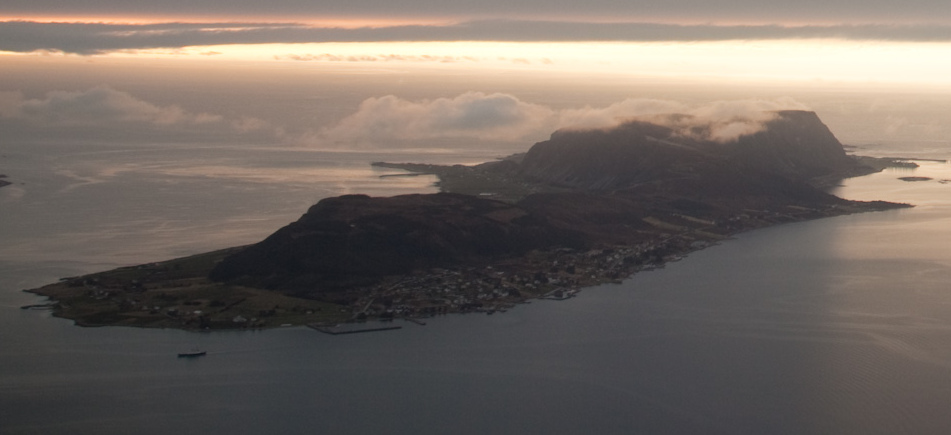
- View of Haramsøya
- Interactive map of Haramsøya

Geography
- Location: Møre og Romsdal, Norway
- Coordinates: 62.6665°N 6.1894°E
- Area: 13.3 km^{2} (5.1 sq mi)
- Length: 8 km (5 mi)
- Width: 3 km (1.9 mi)
- Highest elevation: 347 m (1138 ft)
- Highest point: Mannen

Administration
- Norway
- County: Møre og Romsdal
- Municipality: Haram Municipality

Demographics
- Population: 570 (2024)

Haramsøya is an island in Haram Municipality in Møre og Romsdal county, Norway. The island is located between the islands of Lepsøya and Flemsøya, just 4 kilometres (2.5 mi) northwest of the mainland. The village of Austnes is located on the southeast part of the island, and that is the location of Haram Church. The Ulla lighthouse is located on the north end of the island. The population (2024) of the island is 570.

The Ullasund Bridge connects the island to the other neighboring island of Flemsøya to the north. The Nordøyvegen bridge and tunnel network was completed in 2022. The network connects the island of Haramsøya to the mainland and its neighboring islands and it included the Haramsfjord Tunnel between Haramsøya and the island of Lepsøya (and the mainland) to the south.

== See also ==
- List of islands of Norway
