= Hafslundsøy =

Island in Norway

- Location within Norway

Geography
- Location: Glomma
- Coordinates: 59°17′22″N 11°09′05″E

Administration
- Norway

Demographics
- Population: 2,673 (2016)

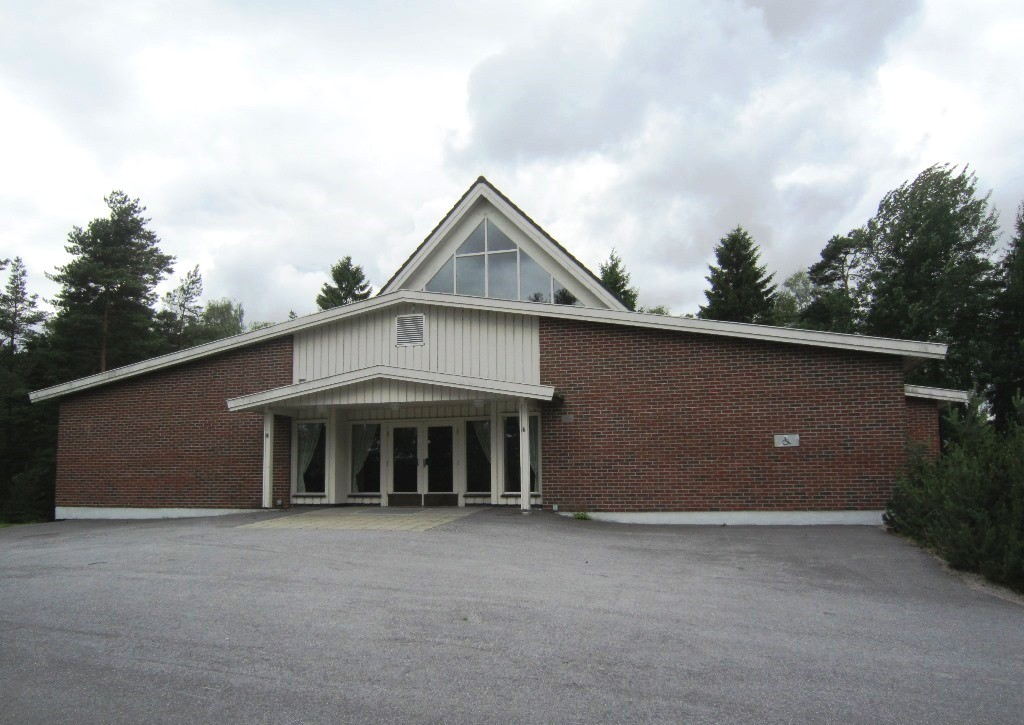
Hafslundsøy kirke

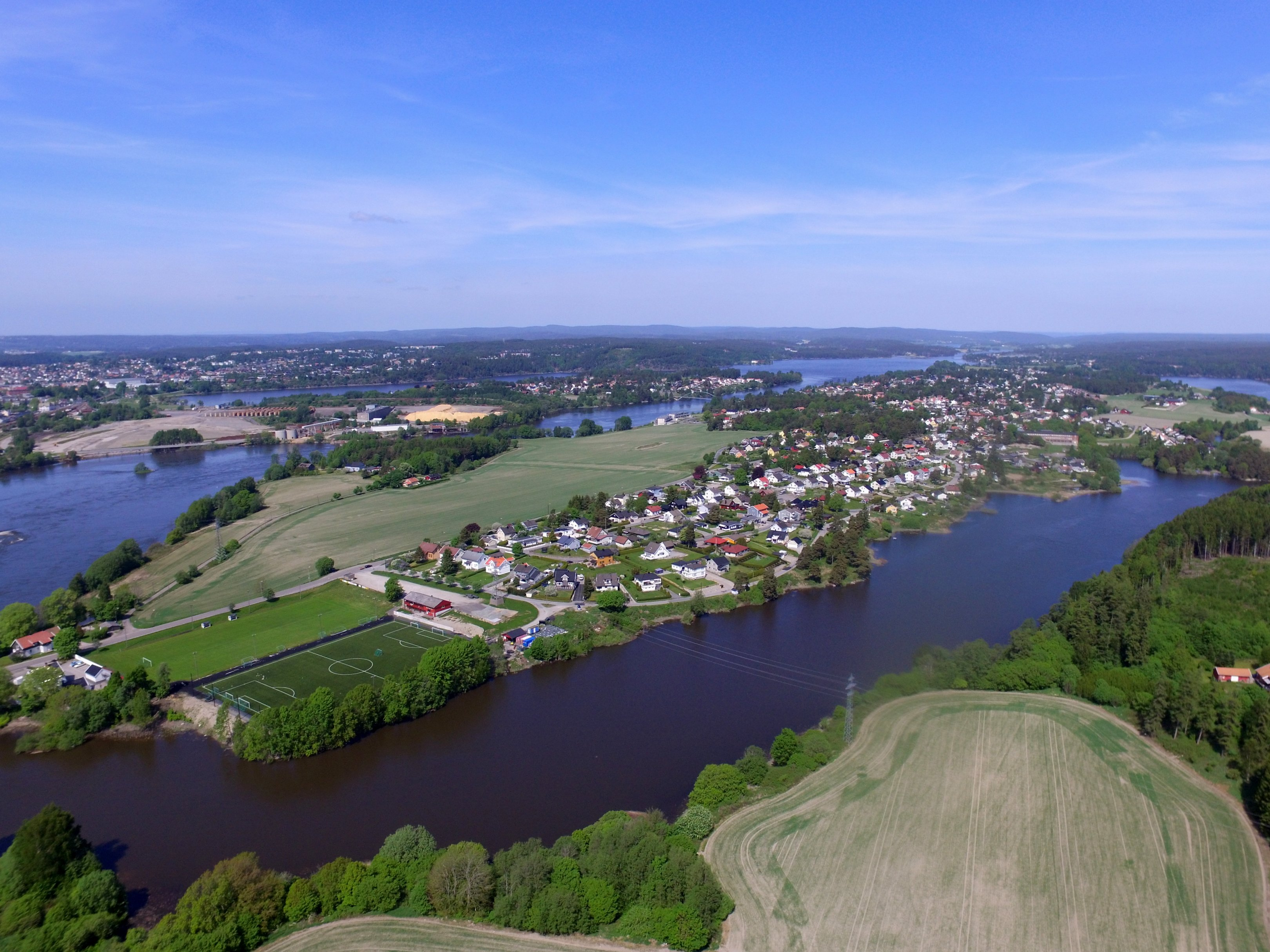
Drone photo of Hafslundsøy from Hafslund in the south

Hafslundsøy is a small island located in the middle of the river Glomma just outside Sarpsborg in Østfold, Norway. It had 2,673 inhabitants in 2016.
