= Nogvafjord Tunnel =

Road tunnel in Møre og Romsdal, Norway

Nogvafjord Tunnel Nogvafjordtunnelen
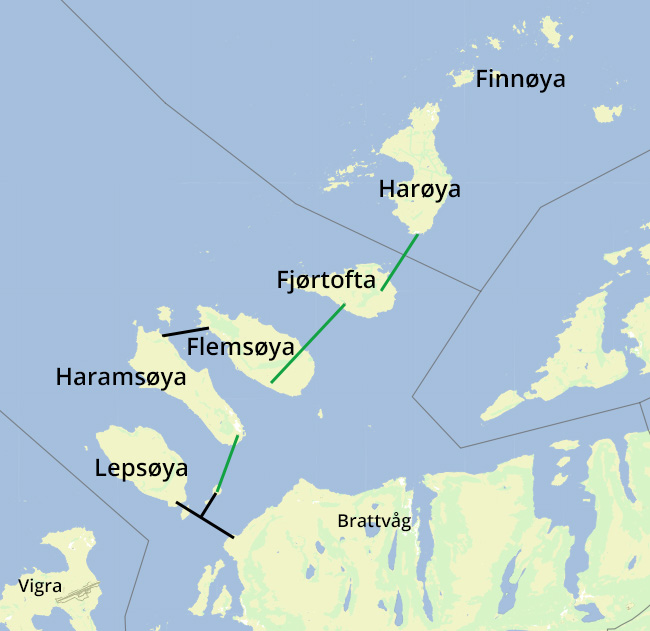
- Map of the Nordøyvegen road network
- Interactive map of Nogvafjord Tunnel; Nogvafjordtunnelen

Overview
- Location: Møre og Romsdal, Norway
- Coordinates: 62.68139°N 6.33753°E
- Status: In use
- Route: Fv659
- Start: Skuløya
- End: Fjørtofta

Operation
- Opened: 27 Aug 2022
- Operator: Statens vegvesen

Technical
- Length: 5,730 metres (3.56 mi)
- Min elevation: 134 metres (440 ft)
- Grade: 7%

The Nogvafjord Tunnel (Norwegian: Nogvafjordtunnelen) is an undersea road tunnel in Haram Municipality in Møre og Romsdal county, Norway. The tunnel connects the island of Fjørtofta to the island of Skuløya. The 5,730-metre (3.56 mi) long tunnel opened on 27 August 2022 and it reaches a depth of 134 metres (440 ft) below sea level. It is part of Norwegian County Road 659 and the Nordøyvegen road network.
