= Ulla Lighthouse =

Ulla Lighthouse Ulla fyr
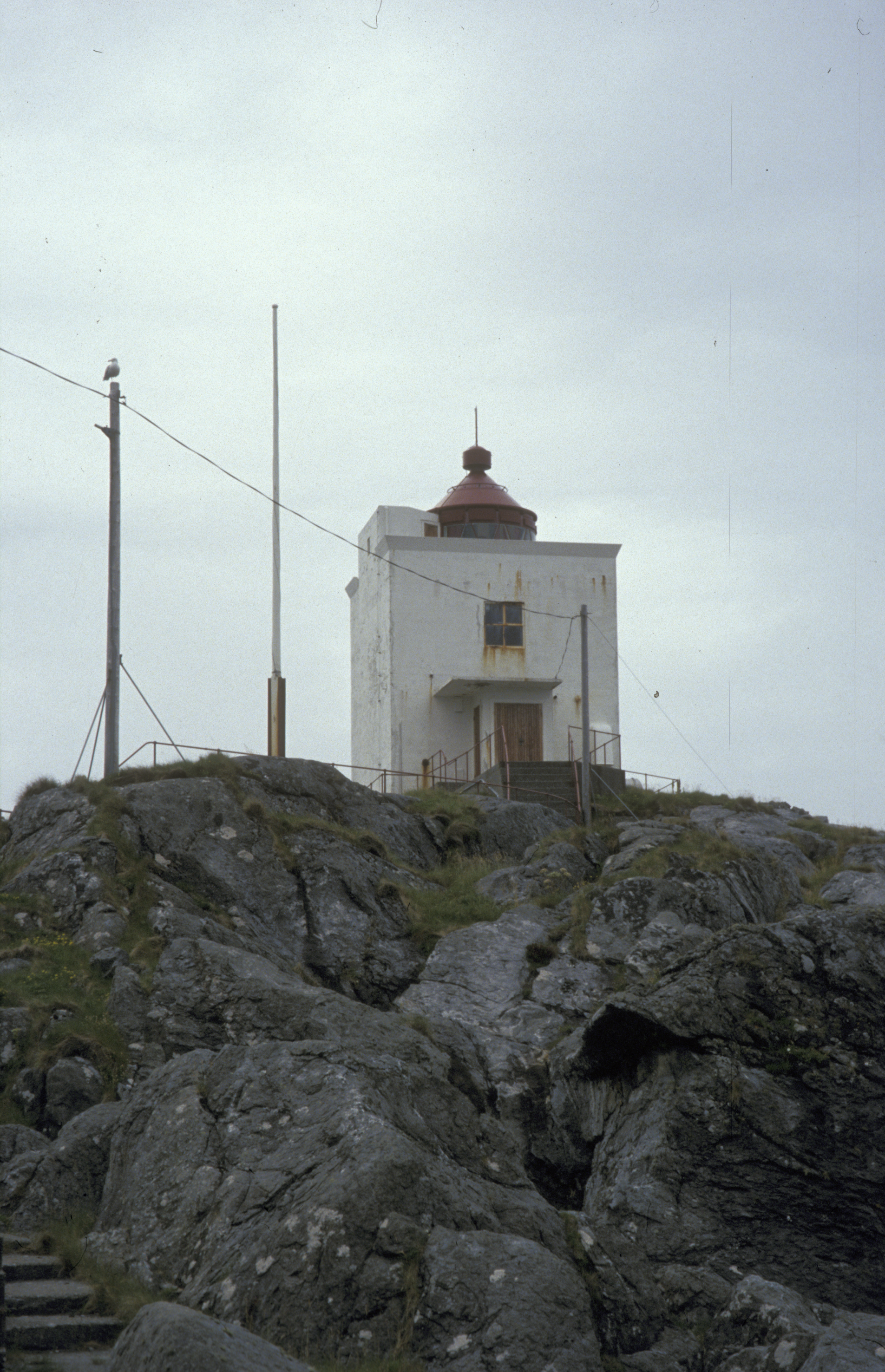
- Location: Haramsøya, Haram Municipality, Norway
- Coordinates: 62°41′07″N 6°09′54″E

Tower
- Constructed: 1874
- Construction: concrete
- Automated: 1975
- Height: 10.5 m (34 ft)
- Shape: square
- Operator: Friends of Ulla lighthouse
- Heritage: cultural property

Light
- First lit: 1950
- Focal height: 21.5 m (71 ft)
- Range: 10.6 nmi (19.6 km; 12.2 mi) (red), 14.2 nmi (26.3 km; 16.3 mi) (white)
- Characteristic: Oc(2) WRG 10s

Ulla Lighthouse (Norwegian: Ulla fyr) is a lighthouse just off the north end of the island of Haramsøya in Haram Municipality, Møre og Romsdal county, Norway.

The lighthouse sits on the very small island of Ulla, about 1.5 kilometres (0.93 mi) northwest of the Ullasund Bridge. The light at the top of the 10-metre (33 ft) tall tower emits a white, red or green light, depending on direction, occulting twice every 10 seconds. The light sits at an elevation of 22 metres (72 ft) above sea level.

In October 1944, the lighthouse and the surrounding buildings were attacked by allied airplanes. The lighthouse was badly destroyed, and not rebuilt until after the war in 1950.

The lighthouse is still in operation, and is protected by the Norwegian government as an historical landmark. The Norwegian Coastal Administration owns the surrounding buildings, and the old station is available for hire.
