= Fjørtofta =

Island in Møre og Romsdal, Norway

Fjørtoft
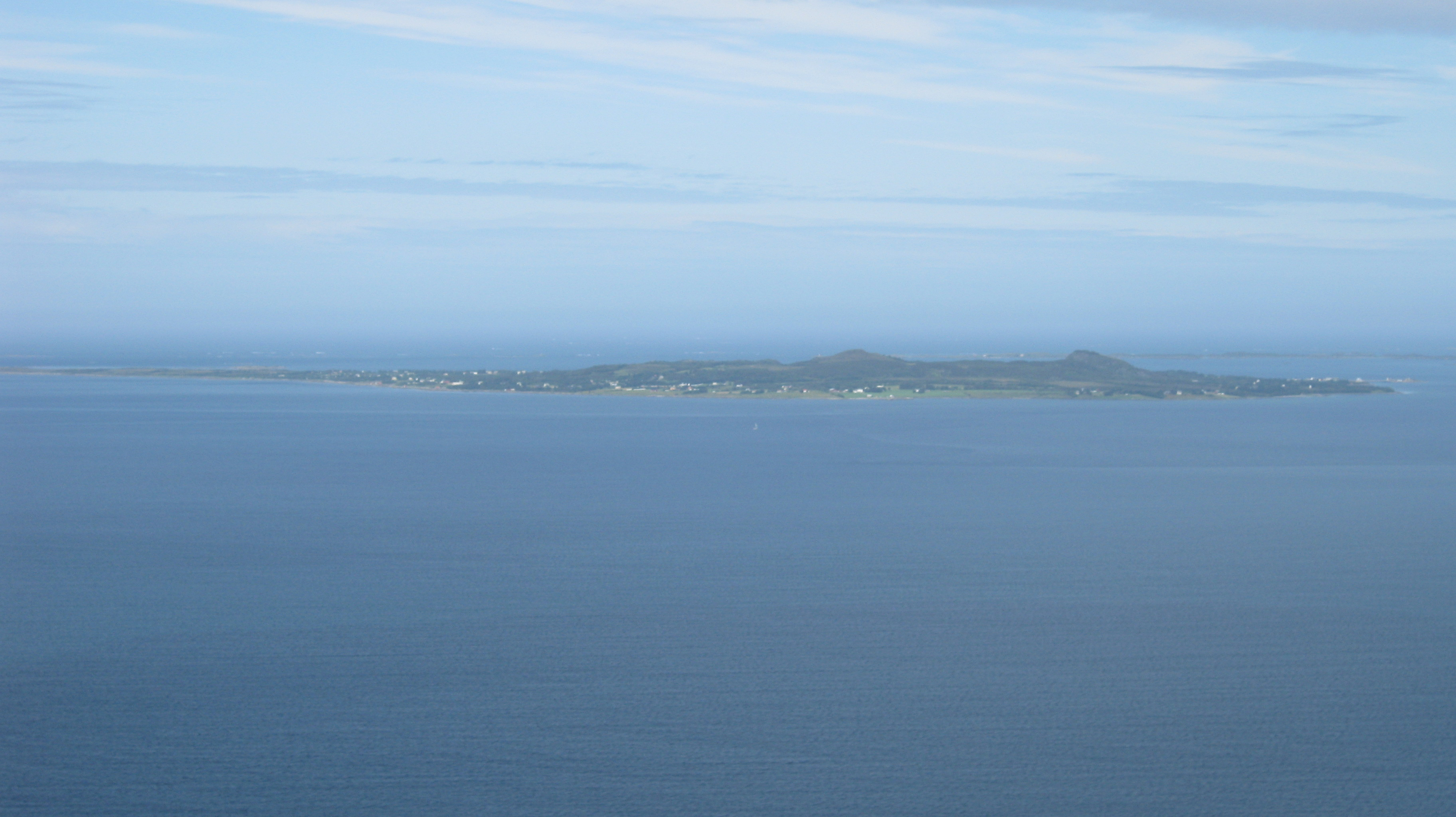
- View of Fjørtoft
- Interactive map of Fjørtoft

Geography
- Location: Møre og Romsdal, Norway
- Coordinates: 62.6990°N 6.3729°E
- Area: 8.9 km^{2} (3.4 sq mi)
- Length: 3 km (1.9 mi)
- Width: 6 km (3.7 mi)
- Highest elevation: 112 m (367 ft)
- Highest point: Æafjellet

Administration
- Norway
- County: Møre og Romsdal
- Municipality: Haram Municipality

Demographics
- Population: 114 (2024)

Fjørtoft is an island in Haram Municipality in Møre og Romsdal county, Norway. The 8.9-square-kilometre (3.4 sq mi) island is located in the northern part of the municipality, between the islands of Flemsøya, Harøya, and Midøya and Dryna (both in Molde Municipality).

Fjørtoft is a fairly flat island and the highest point is the 112-metre (367 ft) tall Æafjellet. Agriculture and fishing are the main industries on the island. Fjørtoft Church is located on the northern part of the island. In 2024, there were 114 residents of the island.

The Nordøyvegen bridge and tunnel network was completed in 2022. It included the Fjørtoftfjord Tunnel which connects the island of Fjørtoft to the island of Harøya to the north and the Nogvafjord Tunnel which connects Fjørtoft to the island of Flemsøya to the south.

== See also ==
- List of islands of Norway
