= Håja =

Island in Finnmark, Norway

Håja (Norwegian); Jievju (Northern Sami)
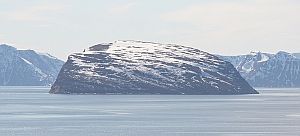
- View of the island in May 2010
- Interactive map of: Håja (Norwegian); Jievju (Northern Sami)

Geography
- Location: Finnmark, Norway
- Coordinates: 70.6611°N 23.4410°E

Administration
- Norway
- County: Finnmark
- Municipality: Hammerfest Municipality

Håja (Norwegian) or Jievju (Northern Sami) is an unpopulated island in Hammerfest Municipality in Finnmark county, Norway. Håja is located in the Sørøysundet strait, between the larger islands of Kvaløya to the east, Seiland to the south, and Sørøya to the northwest. The town of Hammerfest lies about 8 kilometres (5.0 mi) to the east of Håja.

On the island, there is a gull colony. Locals use the island for picking seagull eggs and berries, traditional ingredients of North Norwegian cuisine.

Several companies and institutions in Hammerfest have been named after Håja, including a kindergarten.
