= Nordøyvegen =

Bridge and tunnel network in Møre og Romsdal, Norway

Nordøyvegen (transl. The North Island Road) is a road network in Sunnmøre in Møre og Romsdal county, Norway. The bridge and tunnel network connects the islands of the former Sandøy Municipality (now part of Ålesund Municipality) and the islands of Haram Municipality to the mainland. The road was built by Skanska for 5.6 billion kr. It provides a faster, ferry-free connection to the mainland for the approximately 3,000 residents of the islands. The road is partly financed by a toll station at the Lepsøy, as of 2022 costing 219 kr per direction for cars.

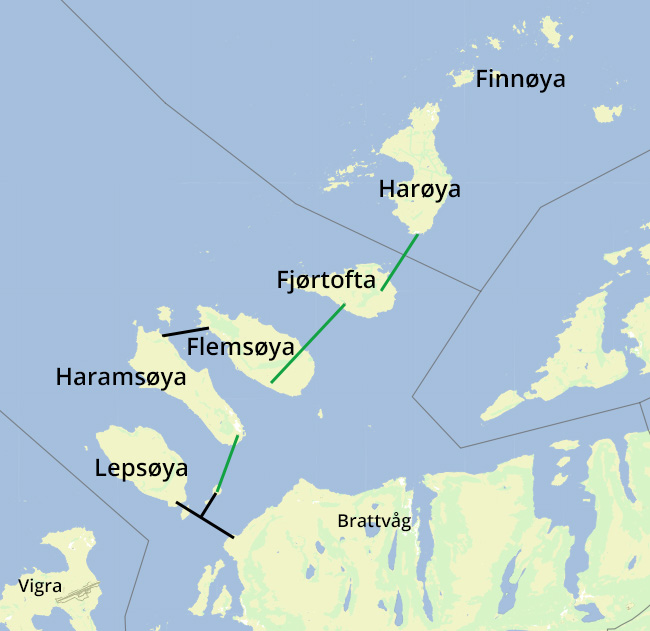
Map of the project

The project includes crossing four fjords with tunnels and bridges and upgrading and re-routing roads on the islands to meet national standards. A total of seven islands is connected to the mainland using two existing bridges and by building three new bridges, a causeway using fill, and three undersea tunnels. The islands, from north to south, are Finnøya, Harøya, Fjørtofta, Skuløya, Haramsøya, Hestøya, and Lepsøya. The entire connection opened on 27 August 2022. The new construction includes:

- The Lepsøy Bridge, Lauvøy Bridge, and Hamnaskjersund Bridge connect the mainland to the island of Lepsøya and to the small island of Hestøya. The three bridges will be part of a 2,735-metre (8,973 ft) long causeway built with fill in the rather shallow water. A roundabout is built part-way between the mainland and the two islands. This connection opened for public traffic on 18 december 2021.
- The 3,500-metre (11,500 ft) long Haramsfjord Tunnel connects the island of Haramsøya to the small island of Hestøya and the bridge network connecting to the mainland and Lepsøya.
- The 5,730-metre (18,800 ft) long Nogvafjord Tunnel connects the island to Fjørtofta to the island of Skuløya (which was already connected to Haramsøya island by a bridge).
- The 3,680-metre (12,070 ft) long Fjørtoftfjord Tunnel connects the island of Harøya to the island of Fjørtofta. Harøya was already connected to the island of Finnøya by a bridge.
