= Ullasund Bridge =

Ullasund Bridge Ullasundbrua
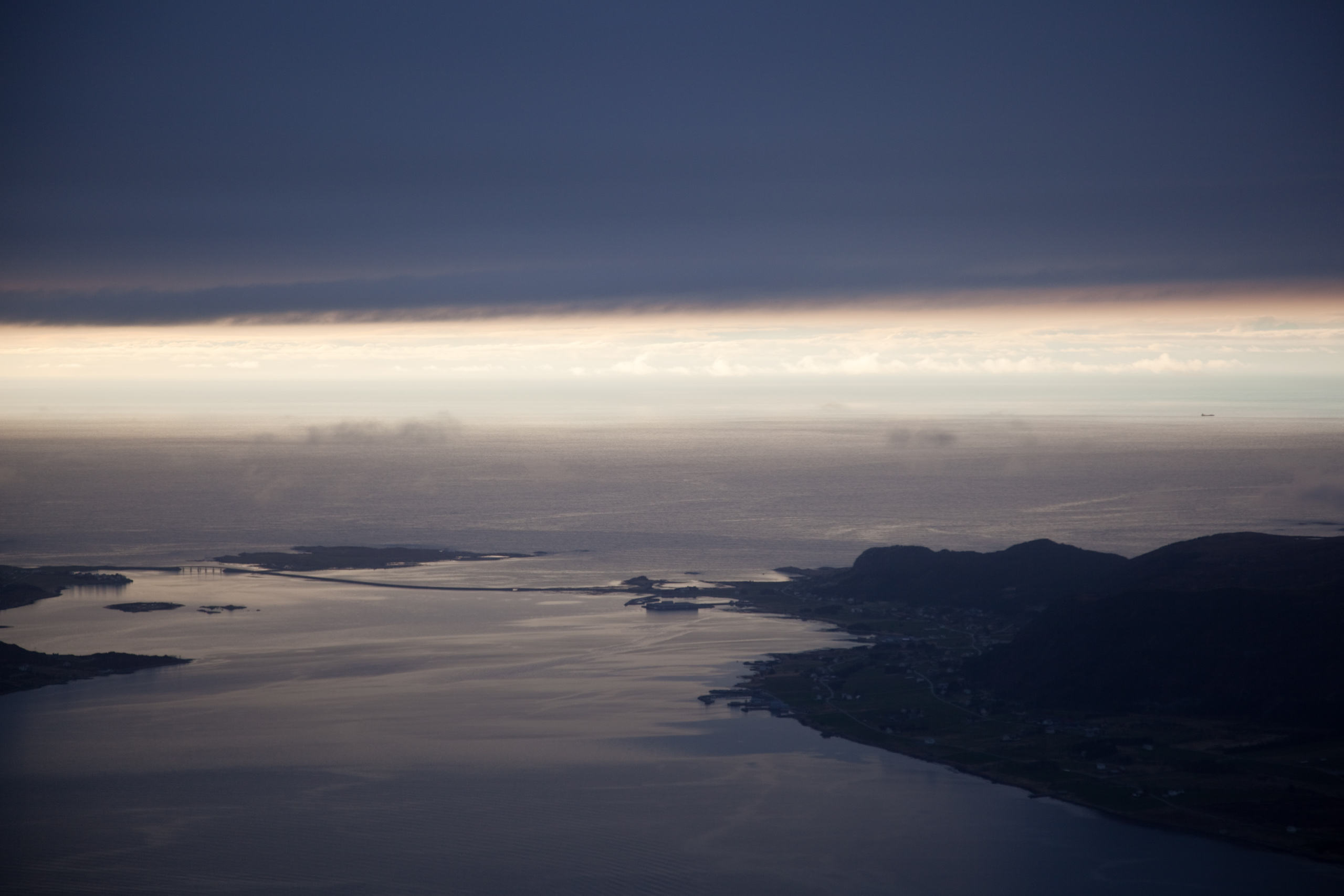
- View of the bridge in upper left part of picture.
- Coordinates: 62.6833°N 6.1964°E
- Carries: Fv150
- Crosses: Ullasundet
- Locale: Haram Municipality, Norway

Characteristics
- Total length: 180 metres (590 ft)

History
- Opened: 1969, replaced in 1998

The Ullasund Bridge (Norwegian: Ullasundbrua) is a bridge that crosses the Ullasundet strait between the islands of Haramsøya and Flemsøya in Haram Municipality in Møre og Romsdal county, Norway. The original bridge was opened in 1969. The Ulla lighthouse is located just northwest of the eastern end of the bridge.

Many bridges need to be repaired because the salt in the seawater damages the concrete and the iron inside it. The old Ullasund Bridge actually had to be taken down, because it was too damaged. It was taken down in 1998, after just 29 years in service. It has been replaced with a new bridge.

== See also ==
- List of bridges in Norway
- List of bridges in Norway by length
- List of bridges
- List of bridges by length
