= Etymological dictionary =

Dictionary that explains the etymologies of words

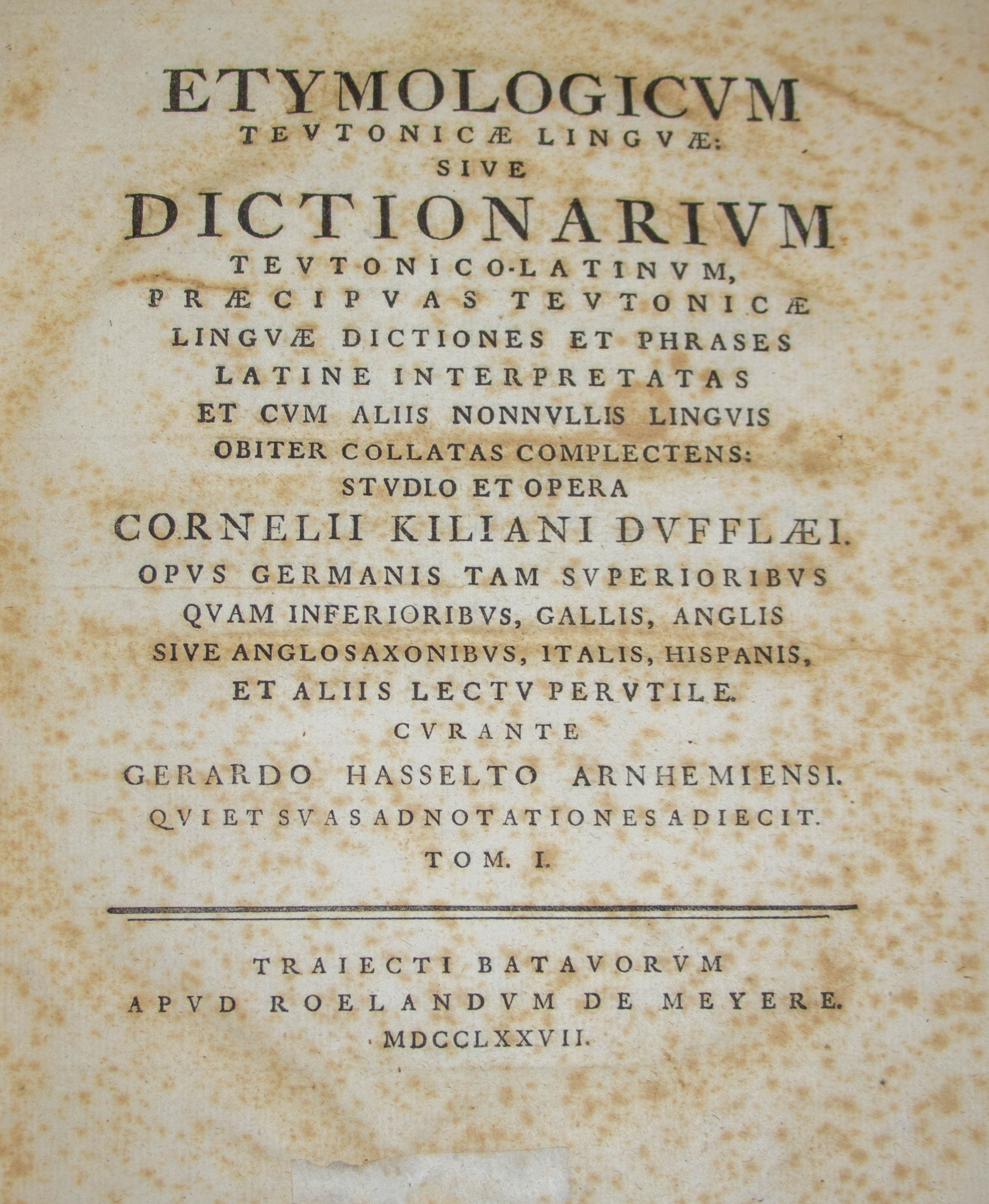
Etymologicum Teutonicae Linguae, 1777.

An etymological dictionary discusses the etymology of the words listed. Often, large dictionaries, such as the Oxford English Dictionary and Webster's, will contain some etymological information, without aspiring to focus on etymology.

Etymological dictionaries are the product of research in historical linguistics. For many words in any language, the etymology will be uncertain, disputed, or simply unknown. In such cases, depending on the space available, an etymological dictionary will present various suggestions and perhaps make a judgement on their likelihood, and provide references to a full discussion in specialist literature.

The tradition of compiling "derivations" of words is pre-modern, found for example in Sanskrit (nirukta), Arabic (al-ištiqāq) and also in Western tradition (in works such as the Etymologicum Magnum and Isidore of Seville's Etymologiae). Etymological dictionaries in the modern sense, however, appear only in the late 18th century (with 17th-century predecessors such as Sebastián de Covarrubias's 1611Tesoro de la lengua castellana o española, Vossius' 1662 Etymologicum linguae Latinae and Stephen Skinner's 1671 Etymologicon Linguae Anglicanae), while the formulation of sound laws and language change and their production was an important task of the "golden age of philology" in the 19th century.

== Indo-European ==
- August Fick. Wörterbuch der Indogermanischen Grundsprache in ihrem Bestande vor der Völkertrennung. Göttingen: Vandenhoeck & Ruprecht's Verlag, 1868. Second edition: Vergleichendes Wörterbuch der indogermanischen Sprachen. 2 vols., 1870–1871.
- Alois Walde & Julius Pokorny. Vergleichendes Wörterbuch der indogermanischen Sprachen. 3 vols. Berlin: de Gruyter, 1927–32.
- Carl Darling Buck. A Dictionary of Selected Synonyms in the Principal Indo-European Languages. University of Chicago Press, 1949.
- Albert Carnoy. Dictionnaire étymologique du proto-indo-européen. Louvain: Publications Universitaires / Institut Orientaliste, 1955.
- Julius Pokorny. Indogermanisches etymologisches Wörterbuch (IEW), 2 vols. Index volume by Harry B. Partridge. Tübingen–Berne–Munich: A. Francke, 1957–1969. Revision of Walde-Pokorny 1927–32.
- Stuart E. Mann. An Indo-European Comparative Dictionary. Hamburg: Helmut Buske Verlag, 1984–1987.
- Xavier Delamarre. Le Vocabulaire indo-européen: lexique étymologique thématique. Paris: Librairie d'Amérique et d'Orient, 1984.
- Helmut Rix. Lexikon der indogermanischen Verben: Die Wurzeln und ihre Primärstammbildungen (LIV²), 2nd edn. Wiesbaden: Reichert Verlag, 2001.
- Dagmar S. Wodtko, Britta Irslinger, & Carolin Schneider. Nomina im indogermanischen Lexikon (NIL). Heidelberg: Carl Winter, 2008.
- George E. Dunkel. Lexikon der indogermanischen Partikeln und Pronominalstämme (LIPP). Heidelberg: Carl Winter, 2014.

=== Albanian ===
- Kolec Topalli. Fjalor etimologjik i gjuhës shqipe. Durrës: Jozef, 2017.
- Vladimir Orel. Albanian Etymological Dictionary. Leiden: Brill, 1998.
- Eqrem Çabej. Studime etimologjike në fushë të shqipes. 7 vols. Tirana: Akademia et Shkencave e Republikës Popullore të Shqipërisë, Instituti i Gjuhësisë dhe i Letërsisë, 1976–2014.

=== Anatolian (Hittite) ===
- Jaan Puhvel. Hittite Etymological Dictionary. 10 vols. Berlin: Mouton de Gruyter, 1984–present.
- Alwin Kloekhorst. Etymological Dictionary of the Hittite Inherited Lexicon. Leiden–Boston: Brill, 2008.

=== Armenian ===
- Hrachia Acharian. Հայերեն արմատական բառարան [Dictionary of Armenian Root Words]. 4 vols. Yerevan: Yerevan State University, 1971.
- Guevorg Djahukian. Հայերեն ստուգաբանական բառարան, [Armenian Etymological Dictionary]. Yerevan: International Linguistic Academy, 2010.
- Hrach K. Martirosyan. Etymological dictionary of the Armenian inherited lexicon. Leiden, Boston: Brill, 2010.

=== Balto-Slavic ===
- Reinhold Trautmann. Baltisch-Slavisches Wörterbuch. Göttingen: Vandenhoeck & Ruprecht, 1923.

==== Baltic ====
- Rick Derksen. Etymological Dictionary of the Baltic Inherited Lexicon. Leiden: Brill, 2015.

===== Latvian =====
- Konstantīns Karulis. Latviešu Etimoloģijas Vārdnīca, 2nd edn. Rīga: Avots, 2001.

===== Lithuanian =====
- Ernst Fraenkel, Annemarie Slupski, Erich Hofmann & Eberhard Tangl, eds. Litauisches etymologisches Wörterbuch (LitEW). 2 vols. Heidelberg: Carl Winter; Göttingen: Vandenhoeck & Ruprecht, 1962–65.
- Wojciech Smoczyński. Słownik etymologiczny języka litewskiego (SEJL) [= Etymological Dictionary of the Lithuanian Language], 2nd edn. 2 vols. Vilnius: Vilniaus Universitetas Filologijos fakultetas, 2025 (1st edn. 2007).
  - English translation: Lithuanian etymological dictionary. 5 vols. Trans. by Axel Holvoet & Steven Young. Berlin: Peter Lang, 2018.
- Wolfgang Hock et al. Altlitauisches etymologisches Wörterburch (ALEW). 3 vols. Hamburg: Baar Verlag, 2015.

===== Old Prussian =====
- Erich Berneker. Die preussische Sprache. Texte, Grammatik, etymologisches Wörterbuch. Strassburg: Verlag von Karl J. Trübner, 1896.
- Vytautas Mažiulis. Prūsų kalbos etimologijos žodynas, 2nd rev. edn. [= Etymological dictionary of Old Prussian]. Vilnius: Mokslas, 2013 (1st edn. 1988–1997).

==== Slavic ====
- Franz Miklosich. Etymologisches Wörterbuch der slavischen Sprachen. Vienna: Wilhelm Braumüller, 1886. 547 pp.
- Erich Berneker. Slavisches etymologisches Wörterbuch. 1 vol. and 1st fascicle of 2nd vol. (A-*morъ). Heidelberg: Carl Winter's Universitätsbuchhandlung, 1908–1914. Unfinished.
- Franciszek Sławski (1974–2001) & Mariola Jakubowicz (2023–), eds. Słownik prasłowiański. 11 vols. (A-G, K). Wrocław/Warsawa/Kraków/Gdańsk: Zakład narodowy imienia Ossolińskich / Wydawnictwo Polskiey akademii nauk, 1974–present.
- Oleg Trubachov (1974–2002) & Anatoly Zhuravlyov (2002–2016) & Zhanna Varbot (2016–present), eds. Этимологический словарь славянских языков. Праславянский лексический фонд (Etymological Dictionary of Slavic Languages: Proto-Slavic Lexical Stock) (ЭССЯ / ESSJa). 42 vols. (A-*perzъ). Moscow: Nauka, 1974–present.
- Rick Derksen. Etymological Dictionary of the Slavic Inherited Lexicon. Leiden: Brill, 2008.
- Emanuel Klotz. Urslawisches Wörterbuch, 2nd edn. Vienna: Facultas, 2023 (1st edn. 2017).

===== Belarusian =====
- Belarusian Academy of Sciences. Этымалагічны слоўнік беларускай мовы. 14 vols. (А–Т). Minsk: Belarusian Academy of Sciences, 1978–present.

===== Bulgarian =====
- Стефанъ Младеновъ. Етимологически и правописенъ речникъ на българския книжовенъ езикъ. София: Книгоиздателство Христо Г. Дановъ - О.О. д-во, 1941.
- Vladimir I. Georgiev et al., eds. Български етимологичен речник. 8 vols. (А-фякалка). Sofia: Издателство на Българската академия на науките (vols. 1-3), Академично издателство "Проф. Марин Дринов" (vols. 4-8), 1971–present. (vols. 1-7 available online)

===== Czech =====
- J. Holub, F. Kopečný. Etymologický slovník jazyka českého. Prague: Státní nakladatelství učebnic (1952) [1933]
- Václav Machek. Etymologický slovník jazyka českého. Prague: NLN, Nakladatelství Lidové noviny (2010 [1971]) [1957]
- J. Holub, S. Lyer. Stručný etymologický slovník jazyka českého se zvláštním zřetelem k slovům kulturním a cizím. Prague: SPN (1992) [1967]
- Jiří Rejzek. Český etymologický slovník. Voznice: LEDA (2012 [2001])

===== Kashubian =====
- Wiesław Boryś, Hanna Popowska-Taborska. Słownik etymologiczny kaszubszczyzny. 6 vols. Warszawa: Instytut Slawistyki Polskiej Akademii Nauk, 1994–2010.

===== Macedonian =====
- Goce Cvetanovski. Македонски етимолошки речник. 1 vol. (А–Ж). Скопје: Институт за македонски јазик "Крсте Мисирков", 2025–present.

===== Old Church Slavonic =====
- Linda Sadnik, Rudolf Aitzetmüller. Handwörterbuch zu den altkirchslavischen Texten. Heidelberg: Carl Winter; The Hague: Mouton, 1955.
- Eva Havlová et al., eds. Etymologický slovník jazyka staroslověnského (ESJS). 21 vols. Prague: Academia, 1989–2022. ISBN 80-200-0222-7.

===== Polabian =====
- Tadeusz Lehr-Spławiński (vol. 1), Kazimierz Polański (vols. 1–6). Słownik etymologiczny języka Drzewian połabskich. 6 vols. Wrocław / Warszawa / Krawów / Gdańsk: Zakład Narodowy imiena Ossolińskich / Wydawnictwo Polskiej Akademii Nauk (vols. 1–4) / Wydawnictwo Energeia (vols. 5–6), 1962–1994.

===== Polish =====
- Aleksander Brückner. Słownik etymologiczny języka polskiego, 2nd edn. Warsaw: Wiedza Powszechna, 1957 (reprint 2000; 1st edn. Kraków: Krakowska Spółka Wydawnicza, 1927).
- Kazimierz Rymut. Nazwiska Polaków: słownik historyczno-etymologiczny. 2 vols. Kraków: Wydawn. Instytutu Języka Polskiego PAN, 1999/2001.
- Andrzej Bańkowski. Etymologiczny słownik języka polskiego. 3 vols. Warsaw: Wydawnictwo Naukowe PWN; Częstochowa: Linguard, 2000–2014 (incomplete).
- Krystyna Długosz-Kurczabowa. Nowy słownik etymologiczny języka polskiego. Warsaw: Wydawnictwo Naukowe PWN, 2003.
- Wiesław Boryś. Słownik etymologiczny języka polskiego. Kraków: Wydawnictwo Literackie, 2005.
- Izabela Malmor. Słownik etymologiczny języka polskiego. Warsaw: ParkEdukacja, 2009.

===== Russian =====
- A. G. Preobrazhensky. Этимологический словарь русского языка. Москва: Типография Г. Лисснера и Д. Совко, 1910–1914 (vols. 1–2: А–С) – Издательство АН СССР, 1949 (vol. 3: тело–ящур).
- Max Vasmer. Russisches etymologisches Wörterbuch. 3 vols. Heidelberg: Carl Winter, 1953–58. (Translated into Russian and expanded by Oleg Trubachov, Этимологический словарь русского языка. 4 vols. Moscow: Прогресс, 1959–1961.)
- N. M. Shansky, V. V. Ivanov, T. V. Shanskaya. Краткий этимологический словарь. Москва: Гос. учебно-педагогическое издат. Министерства просвещения РСФСР, 1961. ²1971.
- N. M. Shansky (1963–2007), A. F. Zhuravlyov (1999–) (eds.). Этимологический словарь русского языка. 11 vols. (А—Н). Москва: Издательство Московского университета, 1963–present.
- P. Ya. Chernykh. Историко-этимологический словарь современного русского языка [Historical and Etymological Dictionary of Modern Russian Language]. 2 vols. Moscow: Русский язык. 1993.
- Terence Wade. Russian Etymological Dictionary. Bristol: Bristol Classical Press, 1996.
- Vladimir Orel. Russian Etymological Dictionary. 4 vols. Edited by Vitaly Shevoroshkin & Cindy Drover-Davidson. Calgary, Canada: Octavia Press (vols. 1–3) & Theophania Publishing (vol. 4), 2007–2011.
- A. Ye. Anikin. Русский этимологический словарь. 18 vols. (А–зять). Москва: Рукописные памятники Древней Руси [etc.], 2007–present.

===== Serbo-Croatian =====
- Petar Skok. Etimologijski rječnik hrvatskoga ili srpskoga jezika [Etymological Dictionary of the Croatian or Serbian Language]. 4 vols. Zagreb: Jugoslavenska akademija znanosti i umjetnosti, 1971–4. Edited by Mirko Deanović, Ljudevit Jonke and Valentin Putanec.
- Alemko Gluhak. Hrvatski etimološki rječnik. Zagreb: August Cesarec, 1993.
- Vojmir Vinja. Jadranske etimologije: Jadranske dopune Skokovu etimologijskom rječniku [Adriatic Etymologies: Adriatic Addenda to Skok's Etymological Dictionary]. 4 vols. Zagreb: HAZU, Školska knjiga, 1998–2016.
- Aleksandar Loma, ed. Етимолошки речник српског језика. 4 vols. (А–Бљ). Beograd: Srpska akademija nauka i umetnosti, 2003–present.
- Ranko Matasović, Tijmen Pronk, Dubravka Ivšić, Dunja Brozović Rončević. Etimološki rječnik hrvatskoga jezika. 2 vols. Zagreb: Institut za hrvatski jezik i jezikoslovlje, 2016–21.
- Aleksandar Loma, ed. Приручни етимолошки речник српског језика. 1 vol. (А–Ј). Beograd: Institut za srpski jezik SANU, 2023–present.

===== Slovak =====
- Ľubor Králik. Stručný etymologický slovník slovenčiny. Bratislava: VEDA, 2015.

===== Slovene =====
- France Bezlaj (eds. Marko Snoj, Metka Furlan, vols. 3–5) Etimološki slovar slovenskega jezika. 5 vols. Ljubljana: SAZU, 1977–2007. (ISBN 86-11-14125-3), COBISS 10028033
- Marko Snoj. Slovenski etimološki slovar. Ljubljana: Mladinska knjiga, 1997. (2nd edn. 2003, 3rd edn. 2015) (ISBN 961-6465-37-6), COBISS 124973312
- Metka Furlan. Novi etimološki slovar slovenskega jezika. Rastoči slovar. Ljubljana: ZRC SAZU, Inštitut za slovenski jezik Frana Ramovša, 2017–present.

===== Sorbian =====
- Heinz Schuster-Šewc. Historisch-etymologisches Wörterbuch der ober- und niedersorbischen Sprache. 5 vols. Bautzen: VEB Domowina-Verlag, 1978–1996.

===== Ukrainian =====
- Jaroslav B. Rudnyc'kyj. An Etymological Dictionary of the Ukrainian Language. 2 vols. Winnipeg: Ukrainian Free Academy of Sciences, 1962–1982.
- Metropolitan Ilarion. Етимологічно-семантичний словнік української мови. 4 vols. Winnipeg: Society of Volyn / Товариство "Волинь", 1979–1995.
- Oleksandr Savych Mel'nychuk, ed. Етимологічний словник української мови. 6 vols. (А-Я). Kyiv: Naukova dumka, 1982–present.

=== Celtic ===
- Whitley Stokes. Urkeltischer Sprachschatz. Göttingen: Vandenhoeck & Ruprecht's Verlag, 1894.
- Viktor Kalygin. Этимологический словарь кельтских теонимов [Etymological Dictionary of Celtic Theonyms]. Москва: Наука, 2006.
- Ranko Matasović. Etymological dictionary of Proto-Celtic. Leiden: Brill, 2009.

==== Breton ====
- Christian-Joseph Guyonvarc'h. Dictionnaire étymologique du Breton ancien, moyen et moderne (A–amleal). Rennes: Ogam-Celticum, 1973–1975. (6 fascicles, unfinished)
- Albert Deshayes. Dictionnaire étymologique du breton. Douarnenez: Le Chasse-Marée, 2003.

==== Cornish ====
- Enrico Campanile. Profilo etimologico del cornico antico. Pisa: Pacini, 1974.

==== Old Irish ====
- Sanas Cormaic, encyclopedic dictionary, 9th or 10th century
- Joseph Vendryes, E. Bachellery, & Pierre-Yves Lambert. Lexique étymologique de l'irlandais ancien (LÉIA). 7 vols. Dublin: Dublin Institute for Advanced Studies; Paris: CNRC Éditions, 1959–1996. (unfinished)

==== Scottish Gaelic ====
- Alexander MacBain, An Etymological Dictionary of the Gaelic Language, Inverness: Northern Counties Printing and Publishing Company, 1896 (rev. ed. 1911) [available at Hathitrust (1896), Internet Archive (1911)

=== Germanic ===
- Frank Heidermanns. Etymologisches Wörterbuch der germanischen Primäradjektive (EWgA). Berlin: Walter de Gruyter, 1993.
- Vladimir Orel. A Handbook of Germanic Etymology. Leiden: Brill, 2003.
- Guus Kroonen. Etymological Dictionary of Proto-Germanic. Leiden: Brill, 2013.

==== Danish ====
- Jessen, Edwin (1893), Dansk etymologisk Ordbog (in Danish), Copenhagen: Gyldendal, Wikidata Q65525361
- Hjalmar Falk and Alf Torp, Etymologisk ordbog over det norske og det danske sprog. 2 vols. Kristiania: F. Aschenhoug & Co., 1903–1906.
- Jan Katlev, ed. (2000), Politikens Etymologisk Ordbog. Danske ords historie (in Danish), Copenhagen: Politikens Forlag, Wikidata Q110820320

==== Dutch ====
- Jan de Vries. Nederlands etymologisch woordenboek (NEW), 4th edn. Leiden: Brill, 1997 (1st edn. 1971).
- Nicoline van der Sijs. Etymologisch woordenboek: de herkomst van onze woorden, 2nd edn. Orig. by P.A.F. van Veen. Utrecht–Antwerp: Van Dale Lexicografie, 1997 (1st edn. 1989).
- Marlies Philippa, Frans Debrabandere, A. Quak, T. Schoonheim, & Nicoline van der Sijs, eds. Etymologisch woordenboek van het Nederlands (EWN). 4 vols. Amsterdam: Amsterdam University Press, 2003–09.

==== English ====
- Hensleigh Wedgwood. A Dictionary of English Etymology. 3 vols. London: Trübner & Co., 1859–1865.
- Eduard Müller. Etymologisches Wörterbuch der englischen Sprache. 2 vols. Coethen: Paul Schettler, 1865–1867. (2nd ed. 1878–1879)
- Walter William Skeat. An Etymological Dictionary of the English Language. Oxford: Clarendon Press, 1882 (4th edition 1910).
- Ferdinand Holthausen. Etymologisches Wörterbuch der englischen Sprache. Leipzig: Bernhard Tauchnitz, 1917. (2nd ed. 1927, 3rd ed. 1949)
- Ferdinand Holthausen. Altenglisches etymologisches Wörterbuch. Heidelberg: Carl Winter, 1934.
- Eric Partridge, Origins: A short etymological dictionary of Modern English. New York: Greenwich House, 1958.
- C.T. Onions, ed. The Oxford Dictionary of English Etymology. Oxford: Oxford University Press, 1966.
- Ernest Klein. A Comprehensive Etymological Dictionary of the English Language. 2 vols. Amsterdam: Elsevier, 1966–67.
- Terry F. Hoad. The Concise Oxford Dictionary of English Etymology. Oxford: Oxford University Press, 1986.
- Robert K. Barnhart & Sol Steinmetz, eds. Barnhart Dictionary of Etymology. Bronx, NY: H. W. Wilson, 1988 (reprinted as Chambers Dictionary of Etymology; revised shortened edition as The Barnhart Concise Dictionary of Etymology, 1995).
- Anatoly Liberman. An Analytic Dictionary of English Etymology. Minneapolis: University of Minnesota Press, 2008.

==== German ====
- Elmar Seebold, ed. Etymologisches Wörterbuch der deutschen Sprache (EWdS), 26th edn. Originally by Friedrich Kluge. Berlin: Walter de Gruyter, 2013 (1st edn. 1883).
- Albert Larry Lloyd (vols. 1–4), Otto Springer (vols. 1–2), Rosemarie Lühr (vols. 2–), eds. Etymologischen Wörterbuch des Althochdeutschen (EWAhd). 8 vols. (A–swummôd). Göttingen: Vandenhoeck & Ruprecht, 1988–present.
- Wolfgang Pfeifer, ed. Etymologisches Wörterbuch des Deutschen, 7th edn. Munich: dtv, 2004 (1st edn., 1995).
- Gunther Drosdowsi, Paul Grebe, et al., eds. Duden, Das Herkunftswörterbuch: Etymologie der deutschen Sprache, 5th edn. Berlin: Duden, 2013.
- Sabine Krome, ed. Wahrig, Herkunftswörterbuch, 5th edn. Originally by Ursula Hermann. Gütersloh–Munich: Wissenmedia, 2009.

==== Gothic ====
- Sigmund Feist. Etymologisches Wörterbuch der gotischen Sprache. Halle a. S.: Max Niemeyer, 1909. (2nd ed. 1923; 3rd ed. as Vergleichendes Wörterbuch der gotischen Sprache, Leiden: Brill, 1939)
- Ferdinand Holthausen. Gotisches etymologisches Wörterbuch : mit Einschluss der Eigennamen und der gotischen Lehnwörter im Romanischen. Heidelberg: Carl Winter, 1934.
- Winfred P. Lehmann. A Gothic Etymological Dictionary. Leiden: Brill, 1986.

==== Icelandic ====
- Ásgeir Blöndal Magnússon. Íslensk orðsifjabók, 3rd printing with corrections. Reykjavík: Orðabók Háskólans, 1995 (repr. 2008).

==== Norwegian ====
- Hjalmar Falk and Alf Torp, Etymologisk ordbog over det norske og det danske sprog. 2 vols. Kristiania: F. Aschenhoug & Co., 1903–1906.
- Harald Bjorvand and Fredrik Otto Lindeman, Våre arveord: Etymologisk ordbok. Oslo: Novus Forlag, 2000.
- Yann de Caprona, Norsk etymologisk ordbok: Tematisk ordnet. Oslo: Kagge Forlag, 2013.

==== Old Frisian ====
- Dirk Boutkan and Sjoerd Michiel Siebinga, Old Frisian Etymological Dictionary. Leiden/Boston: Brill, 2005.

==== Old Norse ====
- Jan de Vries. Altnordisches etymologisches Wörterbuch. Leiden: Brill, 1957-1960 (^{2}1962 revised ed., ^{3}1977, ^{4}2000).

==== Scots ====
- John Jamieson, An Etymological Dictionary of the Scottish Language (1808), revised 1879–97.

==== Swedish ====
- Elof Hellquist. Svensk etymologisk ordbok. Lund: Gleerups, 1922–1980. (ISBN 91-40-01978-0)
- Birgitta Ernby. Norstedts etymologiska ordbok. Stockholm: Norstedts Förlag, 2008. (ISBN 978-91-7227-429-7)

=== Greek ===
==== Ancient Greek ====
- Johann Baptist Hofmann. Etymologisches Wörterbuch des Griechischen. Munich: R. Oldenbourg, 1949.
- Hjalmar Frisk. Griechisches etymologisches Wörterbuch. 3 vols. Heidelberg: Carl Winter, 1960–72.
- Pierre Chantraine. Dictionnaire étymologique de la langue grecque: Histoire des mots, 2nd rev. edn. 2 vols. Revised by Jean Taillardat, Olivier Masson, & Jean-Louis Perpillou. Paris: Klincksieck, 2009 (2nd edn. 1994; 1st edn. 1968–80 in 4 vols.).
- Robert S. P. Beekes. Etymological Dictionary of Greek. 2 vols. Leiden: Brill, 2010.
- Rafał Rosół. Frühe semitische Lehnwörter im Griechischen. Frankfurt: Peter Lang, 2013.

==== Modern Greek ====
- Georgios Babiniotis. Ετυμολογικό λεξικό της νέας ελληνικής γλώσσας [= Etymological Dictionary of the Modern Greek Language]. 2 vols. Athens: Κέντρο λεξικογραφίας, 2010.

=== Indo-Iranian ===
==== Sanskrit ====
- Manfred Mayrhofer. Etymologisches Wörterbuch des Altindoarischen (EWAia). 3 vols. Heidelberg: Carl Winter, 1992/1998/2001.
- Manfred Mayrhofer. Kurzgefaßtes etymologisches Wörterbuch des Altindischen (KEWA). 3 vols. Heidelberg: Carl Winter, 1956–1976.

=== Italic (Latin) ===
- Alois Walde. Lateinisches etymologisches Wörterbuch, 3rd edn. 2 vols. Revised by Johann Baptist Hofmann. Heidelberg: Carl Winter, 1938–54 (1st edn. 1906).
- Alfred Ernout & Antoine Meillet. Dictionnaire étymologique de la langue latine: Histoire des mots (DELL), 4th rev. edn. 2 vols. Revised by Jacques André. Paris: Klincksieck, 1985 (4th edn. 1959–60; 1st edn. 1932).
- Michiel de Vaan. Etymological Dictionary of Latin and the Other Italic Languages. Leiden: Brill, 2008.

==== Romance ====
===== French =====
- Walther von Wartburg & Hans-Erich Keller, eds. Französisches etymologisches Wörterbuch: Eine Darstellung des gallormanischen Sprachschatzes (FEW). 25 vols. Bonn: Klopp; Heidelberg: Carl Winter; Leipzig–Berlin: Teubner; Basel: R. G. Zbinden, 1922–67 (some vols. have since been revised).
- Oscar Bloch & Walther von Wartburg. Dictionnaire étymologique de la langue française, 2nd edn. Paris: PUF, 1950 (1st edn. 1932).
- Albert Dauzat, Jean Dubois, & Henri Mitterand. Nouveau dictionnaire étymologique et historique, 2nd edn. Paris: Larousse, 1964 (1st edn. 1938).
- Jacqueline Picoche. Dictionnaire étymologique du français. Paris: Le Robert, 1971.
- Emmanuèle Baumgartner & Philippe Ménard. Dictionnaire étymologique et historique de la langue française. Paris: Livre de Poche, 1996.
- Alain Rey, ed. Dictionnaire historique de la langue française, 4th edn. 2 vols. Paris: Le Robert, 2016 (1st edn. 1992).

===== Italian =====
- Max Pfister & Wolfgang Schweickard, eds. Lessico etimologico italiano. Mainz: Akademie der Wissenschaften und der Literatur, 1979–present.
- Manlio Cortelazzo & Paolo Zolli. Dizionario etimologico della lingua italiana (DELIN), 2nd edn. Bologna: Zanichelli, 2004 (1st edn. 5 vols., 1979–1988).
- Alberto Nocentini. L’Etimologico: vocabolario della lingua italiana. With the collaboration of Alessandro Parenti. Milan: Mondadori, 2010.

===== Portuguese =====
- José Pedro Machado. Dicionário etimológico da língua portuguesa, 3rd edn. 5 vols. Lisbon: Livros Horizonte, 1977 (1st edn. 1952).
- Antonio Geraldo da Cunha. Dicionário etimológico da língua portuguesa, 4th edn. Revised by Cláudio Mello Sobrinho. Rio de Janeiro: FAPERJ/Lexikon, 2010 (1st edn. 1982).

===== Sardinian =====
- Max Leopold Wagner. Dizionario etimologico sardo (DES). 2 vols. Revised by Giulio Paulis. Nuoro: Ilisso, 2008 (1st edn. 3 vols., Heidelberg: Carl Winter, 1960–4).
- Massimo Pittau. Dizionario della lingua sarda fraseologico ed etimologico (DILS). 2 vols. Cagliari: E. Gasperini, 2000–03.

===== Spanish and Catalan =====
- Joan Coromines. Diccionario crítico etimológico de la lengua castellana. 6 vols. Madrid: Gredos, 1954.
- Joan Coromines. Breve diccionario etimológico de la lengua castellana (BDELC), 2nd edn. Madrid: Gredos, 1990 (1st edn. 1971).
- Joan Coromines, Joseph Gulsoy, Max Calmer. Diccionari etimològic i complementari de la llengua catalana. 10 vols. Barcelona: Curial Edicions Catalanes, 1980–2001.
- Joan Coromines & José Antonio Pascual. Diccionario crítico etimológico castellano e hispánico (DCECH). 6 vols. Madrid: Gredos, 1984–91 (ISBN 84-249-1362-0)
- Guido Gómez de Silva. Elsevier's Concise Spanish Etymological Dictionary. Amsterdam–NY: Elsevier Sciences, 1985. (ISBN 968-16-2812-8)
- Michel Bénaben. Dictionnaire étymologique de l’espagnol. Paris: Ellipses, 2000.

=== Tocharian ===
- Albert Joris van Windekens. Lexique étymologique des dialectes tokhariens. Louvain: Bureaux du Muséon, 1941.
- Albert Joris van Windekens. Le tokharien confronté avec les autres langues indoeuropéennes. Vol. 1: La phonétique et le vocabulaire. Louvain: Centre international de dialectologie générale, 1976.
- Jörundur Hilmarsson. Materials for a Tocharian Historical and Etymological Dictionary. Eds. Alexander Lubotsky & Guđrun Thórhallsdóttir with the assistance of Sigurđur H. Pálsson. Reykjavík: Málvísindastofnun Háskóla Íslands, 1996.

== Uralic ==
- József Budenz. Magyar-ugor összehasonlító szótár. 5 vols. Budapest : Hungarian Academy of Sciences, 1873–1881.
- Otto Donner. Vergleichendes Wörterbuch der finnisch-ugrischen Sprachen. Vertaileva sanakirja Suomalais-Ugrilaisten kielten alalla. 3 vols. Helsinki: Finnish Literature Society, 1874–1888.
- Björn Collinder. Fenno-Ugric Vocabulary. Stockholm: Almqvist & Wiksell, 1955. 2nd, revised edition: Hamburg: Buske, 1977.
- Károly Rédei, ed. Uralisches etymologisches Wörterbuch (UEW). 3 vols. Budapest: Akadémiai Kiadó; Wiesbaden: Harrassowitz, 1986–91.

=== Estonian ===
- Julius Mägiste. Estnisches etymologisches Wörterbuch. 12 vols. Helsinki: Suomalais-Ugrilainen Seura, 1982–83.
- Iris Metsmägi, ed. Eesti etümoloogiasõnaraamat [Etymological Dictionary of Estonian]. Tallinn: Eesti Keele Sihtasutus, 2012. ISBN 978-9985-79-478-4

=== Finnish ===
- Y. H. Toivonen, Erkki Itkonen, Aulis J. Joki & Reino Peltola, eds. Suomen kielen etymologinen sanakirja [Etymological Dictionary of the Finnish Language]. 7 vols. Helsinki: Suomalais-Ugrilainen Seura, 1955–81.
- Erkki Itkonen & Ulla-Maija Forsberg, eds. Suomen sanojen alkuperä [The Origin of Finnish Words]. 3 vols. Helsinki: Kotimaisten kielten tutkimuskeskus / Suomalaisen Kirjallisuuden Seura, 1992–2000 (vol. 1, A–K 1992; vol. 2, L–P 1995; vol. 3, R–Ö 2000).
- Kaisa Häkkinen. Nykysuomen etymologinen sanakirja [Etymological Dictionary of Modern Finnish]. Juva: WSOY. 2004.
- An online etymological dictionary of Finnish (Suomen etymologinen sanakirja) is provided by Kotimaisten kielten tutkimuskeskus.

=== Hungarian ===
- István Tótfalusi. Magyar etimológiai nagyszótár. Budapest: Arcanum Adatbázis, 2001.
- András Róna-Tas & Árpád Berta. West Old Turkic: Turkic Loanwords in Hungarian. 2 vols. Wiesbaden: Harrassowitz, 2011.
- Gábor Zaicz. Etimológiai szótár: Magyar szavak és toldalékok eredete (‘Dictionary of Etymology: The origin of Hungarian words and affixes’), 2nd edn. Budapest: Tinta Könyvkiadó, 2021 (1st edn., 2006)

=== Khanty ===
- Wolfgang Steinitz. Dialektologisches und etymologisches Wörterbuch der ostjakischen Sprache. Berlin: Akademie-Verlag, 1966–93.

=== Komi ===
- V. I. Lytkin & Ye. S. Gulyayev. Краткий этимологический словар коми языка [Short Etymological Dictionary of the Komi Language]. Moscow: Nauka, 1970.

=== Mari ===
- Gábor Bereczki. Etymologisches Wörterbuch des Tscheremissischen (Mari). Veröffentlichungen der Societas Uralo-Altaica 86. Wiesbaden: Harrassowitz, 2013.

=== Mordvinic ===
- Вершинин, В. И. Этимологический словарь мордовских (эрзянского и мокшанского) языков. 5 vols. Joshkar-Ola, 2004–2011.

== Other languages ==
- Basque
  - Joseba Lakarra, Julen Manterola, Iñaki Segurola. Euskal Hiztegi Historiko-Etimologikoa [Basque Historical-Etymological Dictionary]. Bilbo: Euskaltzaindia, 2019.
- Burji
  - Sasse, Hans-Jürgen. An Etymological Dictionary of Burji [Kuschitische Sprachstudien 1]. Hamburg: Buske, 1982. (ISBN 3871185612)
- Chinese
  - Axel Schuessler. ABC Etymological Dictionary of Old Chinese. Honolulu: University of Hawaii Press, 2007.
- Coptic
  - Jaroslav Černý. Coptic Etymological Dictionary. Cambridge: Cambridge University Press, 1976.
- Gurage
  - Wolf Leslau. Etymological Dictionary of Gurage (Ethiopic). 3 vols. Wiesbaden: Otto Harrassowitz, 1979. (ISBN 3-447-02041-5)
- Harari
  - Wolf Leslau. Etymological dictionary of Harari. Berkely: University of Los Angeles, 1963.
- Turkish
  - Marek Stachowski. Kurzgefaßtes etymologisches Wörterbuch der türkischen Sprache. Cracow: Księgarnia Akademicka, 2019.
  - Andreas Tietze. Tarihi ve etimolojik Türkiye Türkçesi lugatı (TETTL²), 2nd edn. 10 vols. Ankara: Türkiye Bilimleri Akademisi, 2016-2020.
  - Sevan Nişanyan. Sözlerin soyağacı: çağdaş Türkçenin etimolojik sözlüğü. Beyoğlu (Istanbul): Adam, 2002.
  - Gerard Leslie Makins Clauson. An Etymological Dictionary of Pre-Thirteenth-Century Turkish. London: Oxford University Press, 1972.

=== Other language families and sprachbunds ===
- Afro-Asiatic
  - Vladimir Orel & Olga V. Stolbova. Hamito-Semitic Etymological Dictionary: Materials for a Reconstruction. Leiden: Brill, 1995.
- Altaic sprachbund
  - Sergei Starostin, Anna Dybo & Oleg Mudrak. Etymological Dictionary of the Altaic Languages. Leiden: Brill, 2003.
- Dravidian
  - Thomas D. Burrows & Murray Barnson Emeneau. A Dravidian Etymological Dictionary (DED), 2nd edn. Oxford: Munshirm Manoharlal / Clarendon Press, 1984 (1st edn. 1961).
- Kartvelian
  - Heinz Fähnrich & Surab Sardshweladse. Etymologisches Wörterbuch der Kartwel-Sprachen. Leiden: Brill, 1995.
  - Heinz Fähnrich. Kartwelisches Etymologisches Wörterbuch. Leiden: Brill, 2007.

== Online ==
=== Indo-European languages ===
- – Online Etymology Dictionary of English compiled by Douglas Harper
- – Ancient Greek Etymological Dictionary by H. Frisk
- – An Etymological Dictionary of the Hittite Inherited Lexicon by Alwin Kloekhorst
- – Indo-European Etymological Dictionary by S. A. Starostin et al.
- – Nepali Etymological Dictionary by R. L. Turner
- – Romanian Etymological Dictionary
- – Russian Etymological Dictionary by Max Vasmer, Heidelberg (1962), 4 volumes
- – Slovenian Etymological Dictionary (Slovenski etimološki slovar) by Marko Snoj
- – Swedish Etymological Dictionary by Elof Hellquist
- – Belarusian Etymological Dictionary (1978-2017) by Belarusian Academy of Sciences

=== Afroasiatic languages ===
- – Afroasiatic Etymological Dictionary by S. A. Starostin et al.
- – Arabic Etymological Dictionary by Alphaya, LTD
- – Arabic Etymological Dictionary by Andras Rajki
- – Hebrew Etymological Dictionary by Ernest Klein

=== Altaic languages ===
- – Altaic Etymological Dictionary by S. A. Starostin et al.
- – Chuvash Etymological Dictionary by M. R. Fedotov
- – Gagauz Etymological Dictionary
- – Mongolian Etymological Dictionary
- – Turkish Etymological Dictionary by Sevan Nişanyan "Sözlerin Soyağacı – Çağdaş Türkçe'nin Etimolojik Sözlüğü" (Third ed. Adam Y. Istanbul 2007)

=== Austronesian languages ===
- – Austronesian Comparative Dictionary by R. A. Blust
- – Indonesian Etymological Dictionary by S. M. Zain
- – Maori-Polynesian Comparative Dictionary by E. Tregear
- – A Concise Waray Dictionary (Waray-Waray, Leytese-Samarese) with etymologies and Bicol, Cebuano, Hiligaynon, Ilocano, Kapampangan, Pangasinan and Tagalog cognates

=== Bantu languages ===
- – Bantu Etymological Dictionary
- – Swahili Etymological Dictionary
- – Swahili Etymological Dictionary by World Loanword Database

=== Creole languages and conlangs ===
- – Bislama Dictionary with etymologies by Andras Rajki
- – Esperanto Etymological Dictionary
- – Morisyen Etymological Dictionary
- – Volapük Dictionary

=== Uralic languages ===
- – Hungarian etymological dictionary (Új magyar etimológiai szótár)
- – Uralic Etymological Database (Uralonet)
- – Uralic Etymological Dictionary by S. A. Starostin et al.
- – Estonian Etymological Dictionary by Iris Metsmägi, Meeli Sedrik, Sven-Erik Soosaar
- – Zaicz, Gábor. Etimológiai szótár: Magyar szavak és toldalékok eredete (’Dictionary of Etymology: The origin of Hungarian words and affixes’). Budapest: Tinta Könyvkiadó, 2006, ISBN 9637094016, first edition.
  Its second, revised, expanded edition published in 2021 is only available in print (ISBN 9789634092926).
- – Tótfalusi, István. Magyar etimológiai nagyszótár (’Hungarian Comprehensive Dictionary of Etymology’). Budapest: Arcanum Adatbázis, 2001; Arcanum DVD Könyvtár, ISBN 9639374121
- – Álgu. Etymological Database of the Saami Languages.

=== Other languages and language families ===
- – Etymological Dictionary of Basque by R. L. Trask
- – Basque Etymological Dictionary
- – Dravidian Etymological Dictionary by T. Burrow
- – Kartvelian Etymological Dictionary by G. A. Klimov
- – Mayan Etymological Dictionary by T. Kaufman and J. Justeson
- – Mon-Khmer Etymological Dictionary by D. Cooper and P. J. Sidwell
- – Munda Etymological Dictionary by D. Cooper
- – Munda Etymological Dictionary by D. Stampe et al.
- – North Caucasian Etymological Dictionary by S. A. Starostin et al.
- – Sino-Tibetan Etymological Dictionary and Thesaurus by J. A. Matisoff
- – Thai Etymological Dictionary by M. Haas

== See also ==
- Historical dictionary
- List of proto-languages
