= Fredrik Otto Lindeman =

Norwegian linguist (born 1936)

Fredrik Otto Lindeman (born 3 March 1936) is a Norwegian linguist. He is professor emeritus in historical linguistics at University of Oslo.

Lindeman works mainly with Indo-European languages. He has given his name to Lindeman's law, an Indo-European sound law concerning Sievers's law.

Together with Harald Bjorvand, in 2000 he published 1100 pages of Våre arveord, the first etymological dictionary for Norwegian since Hjalmar Falk and Alf Torp's Etymologisk ordbog over det danske og det norske sprog (1903–06). The book was re-released in a new version in 2007. Lindeman has translated Sagaen om Cú Chulainns sykeleie og Emers skinnsyke from Old Irish and Vardan og armenernes krig from Old Armenian for Thorleif Dahls kulturbibliotek.

He is a member of the Norwegian Academy of Science and Letters.

== Works ==
- Les Origines indo-européennes de la "Verschärfung" germanique (1964)
- Einführung in die Laryngaltheorie (1970)
  - English version and revision: Introduction to the "Laryngeal Theory". Oslo: Norwegian University Press and Institute for Comparative Research in Human Culture; Oxford University Press, 1987 (reprint: Innsbruck: Institut für Sprachwissenschaft der Universität, 1997)
- The triple representation of schwa in Greek and some related problems of Indo-European phonology (1982)
- Våre arveord (2000)

=== Translations ===
- Sagaen om Cú Chulainns sykeleie og Emers skinnsyke (1985)
- Vardan og armenernes krig (1992)
