= Holthausen =

Holthausen may refer to the following places in Germany:

== in Lower Saxony ==
- Lingen-Holthausen, a quarter of Lingen
- Meppen-Holthausen, a quarter of Meppen (Germany)

== in North Rhine-Westphalia ==
- Dortmund-Holthausen, a locality of Dortmund, district-free city of the Ruhr area
- Düsseldorf-Holthausen, a locality of Düsseldorf, district-free city of the Rhein-Ruhr-Gebiet
- Hagen-Holthausen, a locality of Hagen district free city
- Hattingen-Holthausen, a locality of Hattingen
- Herne-Holthausen, a locality of Herne, Germany
- Laer-Holthausen, a locality of Laer, in the district of Steinfurt
- Mülheim-Holthausen, a locality of Mülheim an der Ruhr district free city in the Ruhr area
- Plettenberg-Holthausen, a locality of Plettenberg
- Schmallenberg-Holthausen, a locality in Schmallenberg

== People ==
- Ferdinand Holthausen (1860–1956), German scholar of the English and old Germanic languages
- Mike Holt, South African boxer of the 1950s and '60s (birth name Antione Michael Holthausen)
