= Alf Torp =

Norwegian philologist and author

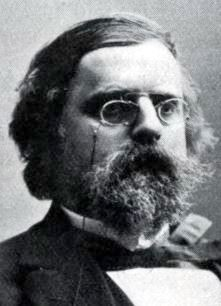
Alf Torp (1853–1916)

Alf Torp (September 27, 1853 – September 26, 1916) was a Norwegian philologist and author. He is most known for his work with Indo-European and Nordic language history and meaning of ancient languages.

== Biography ==
Alf Torp was born in Stryn Municipality, Nordre Bergenhus county, Norway. He became cand. philol. in 1877 at the Bergen Cathedral School. He was a student of Sophus Bugge, and during a stay in Leipzig in 1878-80 a student of Georg Curtius and Ernst Windisch. In 1881 he got his doctorate at the University of Leipzig with the dissertation Die Flexion des Pali in ihrem Verhältnis zum Sanskrit.

He taught at the University of Oslo from 1883 and in 1894 he became professor in Sanskrit and comparative linguistics. He published numerous papers about the inscriptions in various languages including Etruscan, Phrygian, Venetic, Lycian and Hittite. In 1905, he was appointed Knight of 1 Class of Order of St. Olav 1905

Among many other works, in 1903-06 he published Etymologisk ordbog over det norske og det danske sprog (Etymological dictionary of the Norwegian and Danish languages) together with Norwegian linguist, Hjalmar Falk (1859-1928). It was the only Norwegian etymological dictionary for nearly a hundred years, until it was replaced in 2000 Våre arveord - etymologisk ordbok by Harald Bjorvand and Fredrik Otto Lindeman.

== Selected works ==
- Die Flexion des Pali in ihrem Verhältnis zum Sanskrit, 1881
- Vokal- og Konsonantstammer, 1889
- Zu den phrygischen Inschriften aus römischer Zeit, 1894
- Zum Phrygischen, 1896
- Indogermanische Forschungen, 1897
- Etruskische Monatsdaten, 1902
- Bemerkungen zu der etruskischen Inschrift von S. Maria di Capua, 1905
- Gamalnorsk ordavleiding, 1909
- Nynorsk etymologisk ordbok, 1919
