= The Oxford Dictionary of English Etymology =

The Oxford Dictionary of English Etymology is an etymological dictionary of the English language, published by Oxford University Press. The first editor of the dictionary was Charles Talbut Onions, who spent his last twenty years largely devoted to completing the first edition, published in 1966, which treated over 38,000 words and went to press just before his death.

== Editions ==
- C. T. Onions, ed.; edited by C. T. Onions with the assistance of G. W. S. Friedrichsen and R. W. Burchfield (1966, reprinted 1983, 1992, 1994) ISBN 0-19-861112-9

== See also ==
- Oxford English Dictionary
