= Bulgarian Etymological Dictionary =

The Bulgarian Etymological Dictionary (Bulgarian: Български етимологичен речник) is a multi-volume etymological dictionary of the Bulgarian language. It is published by the Institute for Bulgarian Language at the Bulgarian Academy of Sciences. The first seven published corpora are available on the Institution for Bulgarian Language website.

It is an ongoing project, with eight volumes published in the period 1971-2017 and the ninth volume currently in preparation. The first eight volumes cover the words from А to фя̀калка.

== Lexical stock ==
The dictionary includes all of the Bulgarian words collected until the moment of compilation but excludes loanwords that are exclusively used by bilingual Bulgarian speakers, as well as overly specialized terminology.

== Volumes ==
Volume number	Title	Number of pages	Year	Editor	Compilers	ISBN
1	А—З	XCV, 679	1971 (facsimile reprint in 2007)	Vladimir I. Georgiev	В. Анастасов, Л. Димитрова-Тодорова, У. Дукова, Й. Н. Иванов, Д. Михайлова, О. Младенова, М. Рачева, Г. Риков, Т. Ат. Тодоров	ISBN 978-954-322-082-3 (reprint)
2	И—крепя̀	740	1979	Vladimir I. Georgiev	В. И. Георгиев, Й. Заимов, Ст. Илчев, М. Чалъков, Й. Иванов, Д. Михайлова, В. Анастасов, У. Дукова, М. Рачева, Т. Тодоров. Участвали в обсъждането: Р. Бернар, Г. Риков, Е. Машалова, Л. Димитрова	
3	крес^{1}—мѝнго^{1}	800	1986	Vladimir I. Georgiev	В. И. Георгиев, Р. Бернар, Ст. Илчев, М. Чалъков, Й. Н. Иванов, Д. Михайлова, В. Анастасов, Г. Риков, О. Младенова, У. Дукова, М. Рачева, Л. Димитрова-Тодорова, Т. Ат. Тодоров	
4	минго^{2}—па̀дам	1003	1995	Vladimir I. Georgiev, Ivan Duridanov	В. Анастасов, Л. Димитрова-Тодорова, У. Дукова, Й. Н. Иванов, Д. Михайлова, О. Младенова, М. Рачева, Г. Риков, Т. Ат. Тодоров	ISBN 954-430-633-1
5	падеж—пỳска	860	1996	Ivan Duridanov, Maria Racheva, Todor At. Todorov	Васил Анастасов, Лиляна Димитрова-Тодорова, Уте Дукова, Йордан. Н. Иванов, Елена Машалова, Димитрина Михайлова, Олга Младенова, Мария Рачева, Георги Риков, Людвиг Селимски, Тодор Ат. Тодоров	ISBN 954-430-633-1
6	пỳскам—словàр^{2}	886	2002	Maria Racheva, Todor At. Todorov	Васил Анастасов, Христина Дейкова, Лиляна Димитрова-Тодорова, Уте Дукова, Димитрина Михайлова, Мира Начева, Мария Рачева, Георги Риков, Людвиг Селимски, Тодор Ат. Тодоров	ISBN 954-430-633-1
7	слòво—теря̀свам	973	2010	Todor At. Todorov	Васил Анастасов, Христина Дейкова, Лиляна Димитрова-Тодорова, Уте Дукова, Димитрина Михайлова, Мира Нечаева, Мария Рачева, Георги Риков, Тодор Ат. Тодоров	ISBN 978-954-322-353-4
8	тèсам—фя̀калка	886	2017	Todor At. Todorov, Maria Racheva	Десислава Борисова, Мария Гарова, Христина Дейкова, Лиляна Димитрова-Тодорова, Димитрина Михайлова, Мария Рачева и Тодор Атанасов Тодоров	ISBN 978-954-322-890-4
