= Charles Talbut Onions =

English grammarian and lexicographer (1873–1965)

C. T. Onions

Charles Talbut Onions (10 September 1873 – 8 January 1965) was an English grammarian and lexicographer and the fourth editor of the Oxford English Dictionary.

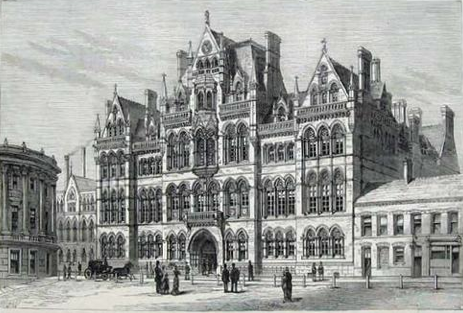
Mason College, now the University of Birmingham

== Life ==
C. T. Onions was born in Edgbaston, Birmingham, the eldest son of Ralph John Onions and Harriet, daughter of locksmith John Talbut. The Onions family were traditionally bellows-makers, but Ralph Onions was a designer and embosser in metal. Charles Onions said he was "the first not to make (his) living by using (his) hands". The name "Onions" derives from the Welsh "Einion".

Onions early came under the influence of A. J. Smith, the headmaster of the King Edward VI Camp Hill School, where Onions received his first contact with lexicography. He obtained a London BA in 1892 and an MA in 1895, both while attending Mason College (which later became the University of Birmingham).

James Murray invited Onions to join the staff of the Oxford English Dictionary (OED) at Oxford in 1895, and in 1914 he began independent editorial work with his own assistants. His Shakespeare Glossary was published in 1911; he co-edited Shakespeare's England: an account of the life and manners of his age (2 volumes; 1916) and, in 1933, he co-edited the OED Supplement with William Craigie. Following the death of William Little in 1922, he assumed the editorship of the Shorter Oxford English Dictionary.

Onions served as a fellow and librarian of Magdalen College, Oxford. He was president of the Philological Society from 1929 to 1933 and was elected a Fellow of the British Academy in 1938. On completion of the OED, the universities of Oxford, Leeds, and Birmingham conferred honorary degrees upon him. Onions was appointed a Commander of The Most Excellent Order of the British Empire in 1934. In 1945 he succeeded R. W. Chambers as honorary director of the Early English Text Society and worked to extend its publishing program. He was editor of Medium Aevum, the journal of the Society for the Study of Medieval Languages and Literature, from its inception in 1932 to 1956. Onions' last twenty years were largely devoted to completing The Oxford Dictionary of English Etymology (1966), which treated over 38,000 words and went to press just prior to his death.

== Personal life ==
In 1907 he married Angela (1883–1941), daughter of Rev. Arthur Blythman, rector of Shenington, and they had seven sons and three daughters. Late in life, two of the children described their father as "a strict and distant figure whose primary relationship was with the Dictionary rather than with them." During World War I, Onions served in British naval intelligence where his knowledge of German proved a significant asset. For much of his life, Onions had a stutter.

Anne Onions, one of his daughters, worked for many years in the Earth Sciences department at the University of Oxford as the departmental secretary and financial administrator.

== Archives ==
Onions' letters are held at the Cadbury Research Library, University of Birmingham. His papers more generally are held in the National Library of Australia.
