= Bulgarian language =

Eastern South Slavic language

Bulgarian
- български език
- Pronunciation: [ˈbɤɫɡɐrski]
- Native to: Bulgaria; Ukraine; North Macedonia; Albania; Greece; Turkey
- Ethnicity: Bulgarians
- Speakers: L1: 6.8 million (2019–2023): L2: 1.2 million (2021); Total: 7.9 million (2019–2023)
- Language family: Indo-European: Balto-Slavic; Slavic; South Slavic; Eastern South Slavic; Bulgarian
- Early forms: Old Church Slavonic: Middle Bulgarian
- Dialects: Eastern Bulgarian; Balkan; Rup; Moesian; Western Bulgarian; Northwestern; Southwestern; Transitional
- Writing system: Cyrillic (Bulgarian alphabet, since 893); Latin (Banat Bulgarian Alphabet) (Banat Bulgarian dialect); Bulgarian Braille

Official status
- Official language in: Bulgaria; European Union
- Recognised minority language in: Albania; Czech Republic; Hungary; Moldova; Romania; Serbia; Turkey; Ukraine
- Regulated by: Institute for Bulgarian Language, Bulgarian Academy of Sciences

Language codes
- ISO 639-1: bg
- ISO 639-2: bul
- ISO 639-3: bul
- Glottolog: bulg1262
- Linguasphere: 53-AAA-hb < 53-AAA-h
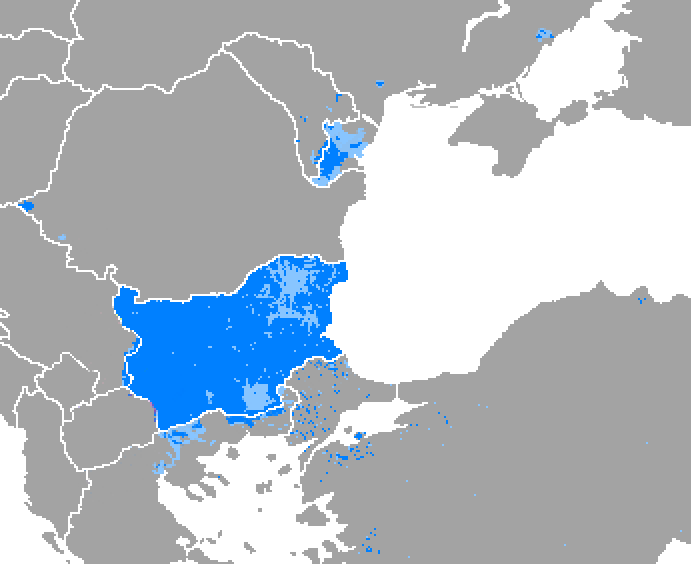
- The Bulgarian-speaking world: regions where Bulgarian is the language of the majority regions where Bulgarian is the language of a significant minority

Bulgarian (Note: /bʌlˈɡɛəriən/; български език, bŭlgarski ezik, pronounced [ˈbɤɫɡɐrski]) is an Eastern South Slavic language spoken in Southeast Europe, primarily in Bulgaria. It is the language of the Bulgarians.

Along with the closely related Macedonian language (collectively forming Macedo-Bulgarian), it is a member of the Balkan sprachbund and South Slavic dialect continuum of the Indo-European language family. The two languages have several characteristics that set them apart from all other Slavic languages, including the elimination of case declension, the development of a suffixed definite article, and the lack of a verb infinitive. They retain and have further developed the Proto-Slavic verb system (albeit analytically). One such major development is the innovation of evidential verb forms to encode for the source of information: witnessed, inferred, or reported.

It is the official language of Bulgaria, and since 2007 has been among the official languages of the European Union. It is also spoken by the Bulgarian communities in Ukraine, North Macedonia, Moldova, Serbia, Romania, Hungary, Albania, Greece and Turkey.

== History ==
One can divide the development of the Bulgarian language into several periods.

- The Prehistoric period covers the time between the Slavic migration to the eastern Balkans (c. 6th century CE) and the mission of Saints Cyril and Methodius to Great Moravia in 860s.
- Old Church Slavonic (9th to 11th centuries) a literary norm of the early southern dialect of the Proto-Slavic language from which Bulgarian evolved, also referred to as Old Bulgarian. Saints Cyril and Methodius and their disciples used this norm when translating the Bible and other liturgical literature from Greek into Slavic.
- Middle Bulgarian (12th to 15th centuries) – a literary norm that evolved from the earlier Old Bulgarian, after major innovations occurred. A language of rich literary activity, it served as an official administration language of the Second Bulgarian Empire, Walachia, Moldavia (until the 19th century) and an important language in the Ottoman Empire. Sultan Selim I spoke and used it well.
- Modern Bulgarian dates from the 16th century onwards, undergoing general grammar and syntax changes in the 18th and 19th centuries. The present-day written Bulgarian language was standardized on the basis of the 19th-century Bulgarian vernacular. The historical development of the Bulgarian language can be described as a transition from a highly synthetic language (Old Bulgarian) to a fusional inflecting synthetic language with some analyticity (Modern Bulgarian) with Middle Bulgarian as a midpoint in this transition.

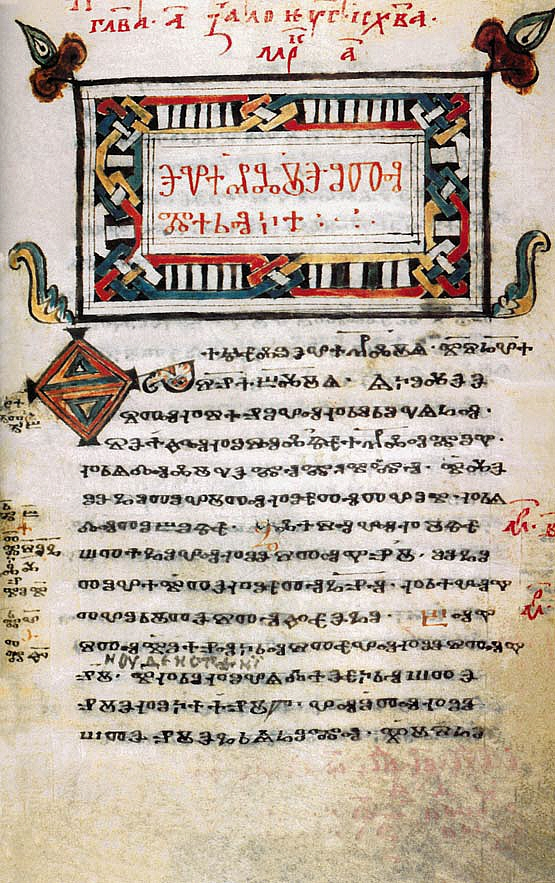
The Codex Zographensis is one of the oldest manuscripts in the Old Bulgarian language, dated from the late 10th or early 11th century

Bulgarian was the first Slavic language attested in writing. As Slavic linguistic unity lasted into late antiquity, the oldest manuscripts initially referred to this language as ѧзꙑкъ словѣньскъ, "the Slavic language". In the Middle Bulgarian period this name was gradually replaced by the name ѧзꙑкъ блъгарьскъ, the "Bulgarian language". In some cases, this name was used not only with regard to the contemporary Middle Bulgarian language of the copyist but also to the period of Old Bulgarian. A most notable example of anachronism is the Service of Saint Cyril from Skopje (Скопски миней), a 13th-century Middle Bulgarian manuscript from northern Macedonia according to which St. Cyril preached with "Bulgarian" books among the Moravian Slavs. The first mention of the language as the "Bulgarian language" instead of the "Slavonic language" comes in the work of the Greek clergy of the Archbishopric of Ohrid in the 11th century, for example in the Greek hagiography of Clement of Ohrid by Theophylact of Ohrid (late 11th century).

During the Middle Bulgarian period, the language underwent dramatic changes, losing the Slavonic case system, but preserving the rich verb system (while the development was exactly the opposite in other Slavic languages) and developing a definite article. It was influenced by its non-Slavic neighbours in the Balkan language area (mostly grammatically) and later also by Turkish, which was the official language of the Ottoman Empire, in the form of the Ottoman Turkish language, mostly lexically. The damaskin texts mark the transition from Middle Bulgarian to New Bulgarian, which was standardized in the 19th century.

As a national revival occurred toward the end of the period of Ottoman rule (mostly during the 19th century), a modern Bulgarian literary language gradually emerged that drew heavily on Church Slavonic/Old Bulgarian (and to some extent on literary Russian, which had preserved many lexical items from Church Slavonic) and later reduced the number of Turkish and other Balkan loans. Today one difference between Bulgarian dialects in the country and literary spoken Bulgarian is the significant presence of Old Bulgarian words and even word forms in the latter. Russian loans are distinguished from Old Bulgarian ones on the basis of the presence of specifically Russian phonetic changes, as in оборот (turnover, rev), непонятен (incomprehensible), ядро (nucleus) and others. Many other loans from French, English and the classical languages have subsequently entered the language as well.

Modern Bulgarian was based essentially on the Eastern dialects of the language, but its pronunciation is in many respects a compromise between East and West Bulgarian (see especially the phonetic sections below). Following the efforts of some figures of the National awakening of Bulgaria (most notably Neofit Rilski and Ivan Bogorov), there had been many attempts to codify a standard Bulgarian language; however, there was much argument surrounding the choice of norms. Between 1835 and 1878 more than 25 proposals were put forward and "linguistic chaos" ensued. Eventually the eastern dialects prevailed, and in 1899 the Bulgarian Ministry of Education officially codified a standard Bulgarian language based on the Drinov-Ivanchev orthography.

== Geographic distribution ==
Bulgarian is the official language of Bulgaria, where it is used in all spheres of public life. As of 2021, it is the first language of 77% of the country or 5,037,607 people.

There is also a significant Bulgarian diaspora abroad. One of the main historically established communities are the Bessarabian Bulgarians, whose settlement in the Bessarabia region of nowadays Moldova and Ukraine dates mostly to the early 19th century. There were 134,000 Bulgarian speakers in Ukraine at the 2001 census, 41,800 in Moldova as of the 2014 census (of which 15,300 were habitual users of the language), and presumably a significant proportion of the 13,200 ethnic Bulgarians residing in neighbouring Transnistria in 2016.

There are Bulgarian speakers in neighbouring countries as well. The regional dialects of Bulgarian and Macedonian form a dialect continuum, and there is no well-defined boundary where one language ends and the other begins. Within the limits of the Republic of North Macedonia a strong separate Macedonian identity has emerged since the Second World War, even though there still are a small number of citizens who identify their language as Bulgarian. Beyond the borders of North Macedonia, the situation is more fluid, and the pockets of speakers of the related regional dialects in Albania and in Greece variously identify their language as Macedonian or as Bulgarian. In Serbia, there were 7,939 speakers as per 2022 census, mainly concentrated in the so-called Western Outlands along the border with Bulgaria. Bulgarian is also spoken in Turkey: natively by Pomaks, and as a second language by many Bulgarian Turks who emigrated from Bulgaria, mostly during the "Big Excursion" of 1989.

The language is also represented among the diaspora in Western Europe and North America, which has been steadily growing since the 1990s. Countries with significant numbers of speakers include Germany, Spain, Italy, the United Kingdom (38,500 speakers in England and Wales as of 2011), France, the United States, and Canada (19,100 in 2011). There were 14,678 Bulgarian speakers in Cyprus in 2021.

== Dialects ==
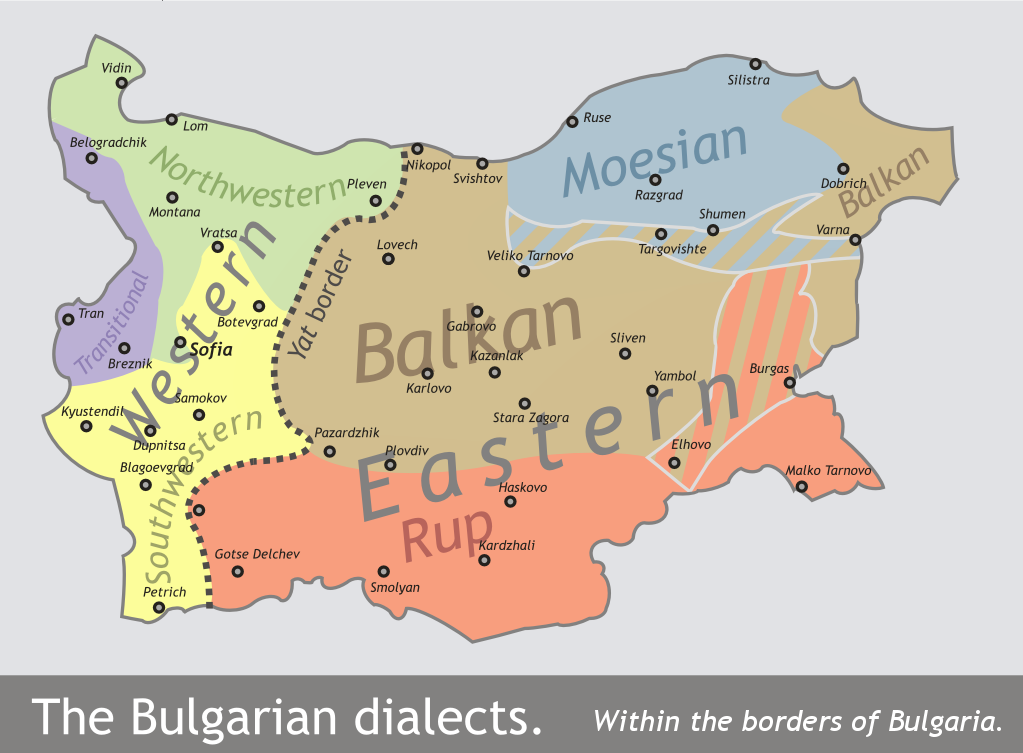
Bulgarian dialects within Bulgaria

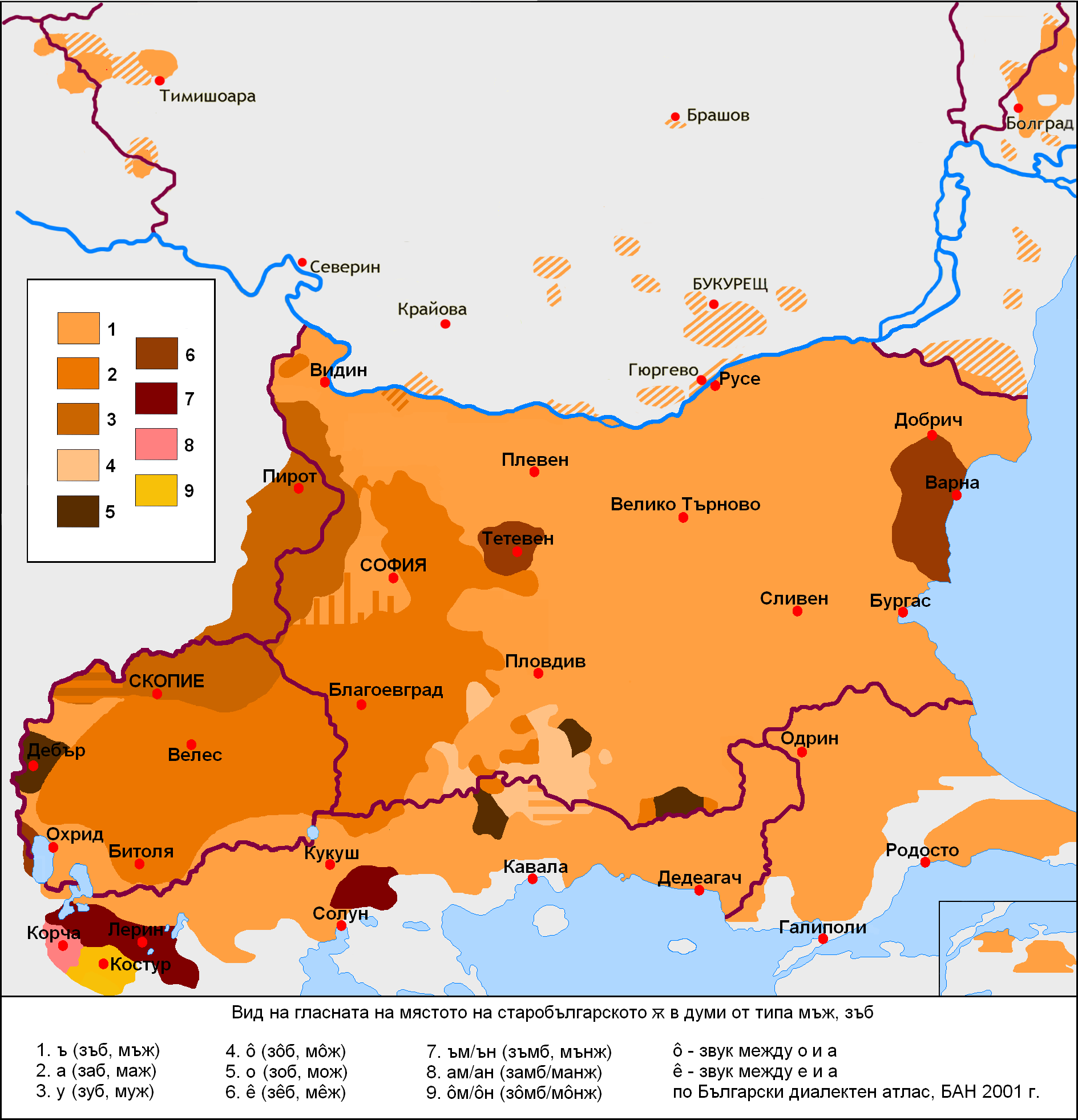
Extent of Bulgarian dialects according to the Bulgarian Academy of Sciences shown encompassing the Eastern South Slavic dialects. Subregions are differentiated by pronunciation of мъж "man" and зъб "tooth".

In Bulgarian the different reflexes of the yat form the so-called Yat border (ятова граница), running approximately from Nikopol on the Danube to Solun (Thessaloniki) on the Aegean Sea. West of that isogloss, old yat is always realized as /ɛ/. East of it, the reflexes of yat prototypically alternate between /ja/ or /ʲa/ (in stressed syllables when not followed by a front vowel) and /ɛ/ (in all other cases). The division of the dialects of the Eastern South Slavic into western and eastern subgroup running along the yat border is the most important dividing isogloss there. The open articulation of yat (as /æ/ or ja) and the reflexes of Proto-Slavic *tj/*ktĭ/*gtĭ and *dj as ⟨щ⟩ (ʃt) and ⟨жд⟩ (ʒd) have traditionally been considered the two most distinctive phonetic features of Old Bulgarian. The language is mainly split into two broad dialect areas, based on the different reflexes of the Proto-Slavic yat vowel (Ѣ). This split, which occurred at some point during the Middle Ages, led to the development of Bulgaria's:

- Western dialects (informally called твърд говор/tvurd govor – "hard speech")
  - the former yat is pronounced "e" in all positions. e.g. млеко (mlekò) – milk, хлеб (hleb) – bread.
- Eastern dialects (informally called мек говор/mek govor – "soft speech")
  - the former yat alternates between "ya" and "e": it is pronounced "ya" if it is under stress and the next syllable does not contain a front vowel (e or i) – e.g. мляко (mlyàko), хляб (hlyab), and "e" otherwise – e.g. млекар (mlekàr) – milkman, хлебар (hlebàr) – baker. This rule obtains in most Eastern dialects, although some have "ya", or a special "open e" sound, in all positions.

The literary language norm, which is generally based on the Eastern dialects, also has the Eastern alternating reflex of yat. However, it has not incorporated the general Eastern umlaut of all synchronic or even historic "ya" sounds into "e" before front vowels – e.g. поляна (polyana) vs. полени (poleni) "meadow – meadows" or even жаба (zhaba) vs. жеби (zhebi) "frog – frogs", even though it co-occurs with the yat alternation in almost all Eastern dialects that have it (except a few dialects along the yat border, e.g. in the Pleven region).

More examples of the yat umlaut in the literary language are:

- mlyàko (milk) [n.] → mlekàr (milkman); mlèchen (milky), etc.
- syàdam (sit) [vb.] → sedàlka (seat); sedàlishte (seat, e.g. of government or institution, butt), etc.
- svyat (holy) [adj.] → svetètz (saint); svetìlishte (sanctuary), etc. (in this example, ya/e comes not from historical yat but from small yus (ѧ), which normally becomes e in Bulgarian, but the word was influenced by Russian and the yat umlaut)

Until 1945, Bulgarian orthography did not reveal this alternation and used the original Old Slavic Cyrillic letter yat (Ѣ), which was commonly called двойно е (dvoyno e) at the time, to express the historical yat vowel or at least root vowels displaying the ya – e alternation. The letter was used in each occurrence of such a root, regardless of the actual pronunciation of the vowel: thus, both mlyako and mlekar were spelled with (Ѣ). Among other things, this was seen as a way to "reconcile" the Western and the Eastern dialects and maintain language unity at a time when much of Bulgaria's Western dialect area was controlled by Serbia and Greece, but there were still hopes and occasional attempts to recover it. With the 1945 orthographic reform, this letter was abolished and the present spelling was introduced, reflecting the alternation in pronunciation.

This had implications for some grammatical constructions:

- The third person plural pronoun and its derivatives. Before 1945 the pronoun "they" was spelled тѣ (tě), and its derivatives took this as the root. After the orthographic change, the pronoun and its derivatives were given an equal share of soft and hard spellings:
  - "they" – те (te) → "them" – тях (tyah);
  - "their(s)" – tehen (masc.); tyahna (fem.); tyahno (neut.); tehni (plur.)
- adjectives received the same treatment as тѣ:
  - "whole" – tsyal → "the whole ...": tseliyat (masc.); tsyalata (fem.); tsyaloto (neut.); tselite (plur.)

Sometimes, with the changes, words began to be spelled as other words with different meanings, e.g.:

- свѣт (svět) – "world" became свят (svyat), spelt and pronounced the same as свят – "holy".
- тѣ (tě) – "they" became те (te).

In spite of the literary norm regarding the yat vowel, many people living in Western Bulgaria, including the capital Sofia, will fail to observe its rules. While the norm requires the realizations vidyal vs. videli (he has seen; they have seen), some natives of Western Bulgaria will preserve their local dialect pronunciation with "e" for all instances of "yat" (e.g. videl, videli). Others, attempting to adhere to the norm, will actually use the "ya" sound even in cases where the standard language has "e" (e.g. vidyal, vidyali). The latter hypercorrection is called свръхякане (svrah-yakane ≈"over-ya-ing").

=== Shift from /jɛ/ to /ɛ/ ===
Bulgarian is the only Slavic language whose literary standard does not naturally contain the iotated e /jɛ/ (or its variant, e after a palatalized consonant /ʲɛ/, except in non-Slavic foreign-loaned words). This sound combination is common in all modern Slavic languages (e.g. Czech medvěd /ˈmɛdvjɛt/ "bear", Polish pięć /pjɛɲt͡ɕ/ "five", Serbo-Croatian jelen /jělen/ "deer", Ukrainian немає /neˈmajɛ/ "there is not", Macedonian пишување /piˈʃuvaɲʲɛ/ "writing", etc.), as well as some Western Bulgarian dialectal forms – e.g. ора̀н'е /oˈraɲʲɛ/ (standard Bulgarian: оране /oˈranɛ/, "ploughing"), however it is not represented in standard Bulgarian speech or writing. Even where /jɛ/ occurs in other Slavic words, in Standard Bulgarian it is usually transcribed and pronounced as pure /ɛ/ – e.g. Boris Yeltsin is "Eltsin" (Борис Елцин), Yekaterinburg is "Ekaterinburg" (Екатеринбург) and Sarajevo is "Saraevo" (Сараево), although – because of the stress and the beginning of the word – Jelena Janković is "Yelena Yankovich" (Йелена Янкович).

== Relationship to Macedonian ==
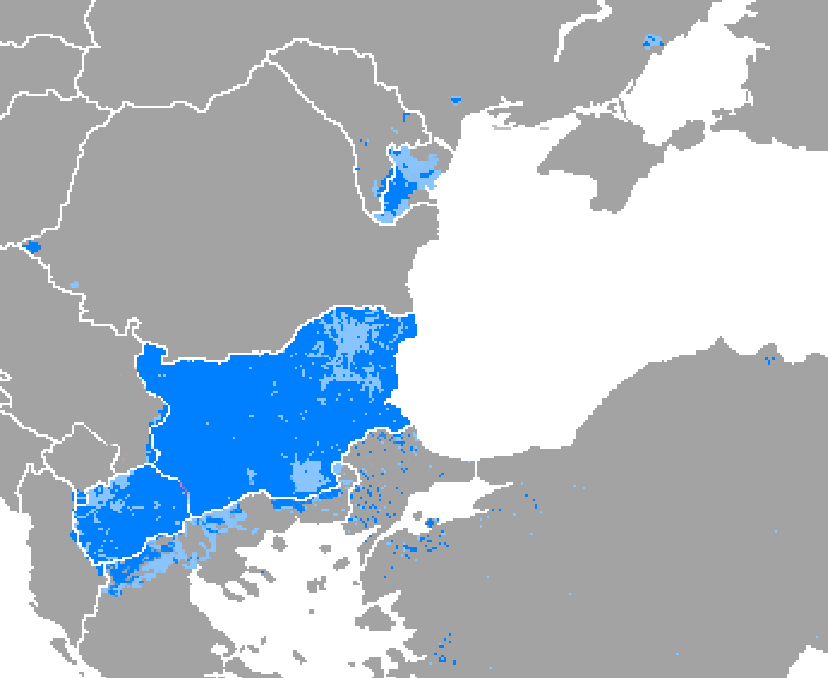
Areas of Eastern South Slavic languages

Until the period immediately following the Second World War, all Bulgarian and the majority of foreign linguists referred to the South Slavic dialect continuum spanning the area of modern Bulgaria, North Macedonia and parts of Northern Greece as a group of Bulgarian dialects. In contrast, Serbian sources tended to label them "south Serbian" dialects. Some local naming conventions included bolgárski, bugárski and so forth. The codifiers of the standard Bulgarian language, however, did not wish to make any allowances for a pluricentric "Bulgaro-Macedonian" compromise. In 1870 Marin Drinov, who played a decisive role in the standardization of the Bulgarian language, rejected the proposal of Parteniy Zografski and Kuzman Shapkarev for a mixed eastern and western Bulgarian/Macedonian foundation of the standard Bulgarian language, stating in his article in the newspaper Makedoniya: "Such an artificial assembly of written language is something impossible, unattainable and never heard of."

After 1944 the People's Republic of Bulgaria and the Socialist Federal Republic of Yugoslavia began a policy of making Macedonia into the connecting link for the establishment of a new Balkan Federative Republic and stimulating here a development of distinct Macedonian consciousness. With the proclamation of the Socialist Republic of Macedonia as part of the Yugoslav federation, the new authorities also started measures that would overcome the pro-Bulgarian feeling among parts of its population and in 1945 a separate Macedonian language was codified. After 1958, when the pressure from Moscow decreased, Sofia reverted to the view that the Macedonian language did not exist as a separate language. Nowadays, Bulgarian and Greek linguists, as well as some linguists from other countries, still consider the various Macedonian dialects as part of the broader Bulgarian pluricentric dialectal continuum. Outside Bulgaria and Greece, Macedonian is generally considered an autonomous language within the South Slavic dialect continuum. Sociolinguists agree that the question whether Macedonian is a dialect of Bulgarian or a language is a political one and cannot be resolved on a purely linguistic basis, because dialect continua do not allow for either/or judgements.

== Phonology ==
Bulgarian possesses a phonology similar to that of the rest of the South Slavic languages, notably lacking Serbo-Croatian's phonemic vowel length and tones and alveolo-palatal affricates. There is a general dichotomy between Eastern and Western dialects, with Eastern ones featuring consonant palatalization before front vowels (/ɛ/ and /i/) and substantial vowel reduction of the low vowels /ɛ/, /ɔ/ and /a/ in unstressed position, sometimes leading to neutralisation between /ɛ/ and /i/, /ɔ/ and /u/, and /a/ and /ɤ/. Both patterns have partial parallels in Russian, leading to partially similar sounds. In turn, the Western dialects generally do not have any allophonic palatalization and exhibit minor, if any, vowel reduction.

Standard Bulgarian keeps a middle ground between the macrodialects. It allows palatalizaton only before central and back vowels and only partial reduction of /a/ and /ɔ/. Reduction of /ɛ/, consonant palatalisation before front vowels and depalatalization of palatalized consonants before central and back vowels is strongly discouraged and labelled as provincial.

Bulgarian has six vowel phonemes, but at least eight distinct phones can be distinguished when reduced allophones are taken into consideration. There is currently no consensus on the number of Bulgarian consonants, with one school of thought advocating for the existence of only 22 consonant phonemes and another one claiming that there are not fewer than 39 consonant phonemes. The main bone of contention is how to treat palatalized consonants: as separate phonemes or as allophones of their respective plain counterparts.

The 22-consonant model is based on a general consensus reached by all major Bulgarian linguists in the 1930s and 1940s. In turn, the 39-consonant model was launched in the beginning of the 1950s under the influence of the ideas of Russian linguist Nikolai Trubetzkoy.

Despite frequent objections, the support of the Bulgarian Academy of Sciences has ensured Trubetzkoy's model virtual monopoly in state-issued phonologies and grammars since the 1960s. However, its reception abroad has been lukewarm, with a number of authors either calling the model into question or outright rejecting it. Thus, the Handbook of the International Phonetic Association only lists 22 consonants in Bulgarian's consonant inventory.

== Alphabet ==
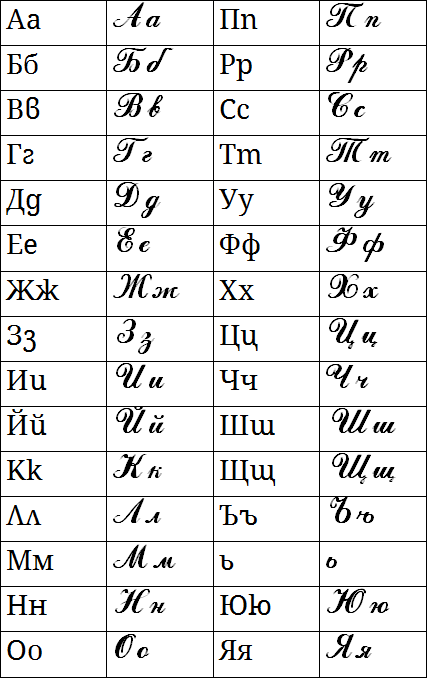
A modern form of the Bulgarian alphabet, derived from the cursive forms of the letters

In 886 AD, the Bulgarian Empire introduced the Glagolitic alphabet which was devised by the Saints Cyril and Methodius in the 850s. The Glagolitic alphabet was gradually superseded in later centuries by the Cyrillic script, developed around the Preslav Literary School, Bulgaria in the late 9th century.

Several Cyrillic alphabets with 28 to 44 letters were used in the beginning and the middle of the 19th century during the efforts on the codification of Modern Bulgarian until an alphabet with 32 letters, proposed by Marin Drinov, gained prominence in the 1870s. The alphabet of Marin Drinov was used until the orthographic reform of 1945, when the letters yat (uppercase Ѣ, lowercase ѣ) and big yus (uppercase Ѫ, lowercase ѫ) were removed from its alphabet, reducing the number of letters to 30.

With the accession of Bulgaria to the European Union on 1 January 2007, Cyrillic became the third official script of the European Union, following the Latin and Greek scripts.

== Grammar ==
The parts of speech in Bulgarian are divided in ten types, which are categorized in two broad classes: mutable and immutable. The difference is that mutable parts of speech vary grammatically, whereas the immutable ones do not change, regardless of their use. The five classes of mutables are: nouns, adjectives, numerals, pronouns and verbs. Syntactically, the first four of these form the group of the noun or the nominal group. The immutables are: adverbs, prepositions, conjunctions, particles and interjections. Verbs and adverbs form the group of the verb or the verbal group.

=== Nominal morphology ===
Nouns and adjectives have the categories grammatical gender, number, case (only vocative) and definiteness in Bulgarian. Adjectives and adjectival pronouns agree with nouns in number and gender. Pronouns have gender and number and retain (as in nearly all Indo-European languages) a more significant part of the case system.

==== Nominal inflection ====
===== Gender =====
There are three grammatical genders in Bulgarian: masculine, feminine and neuter. The gender of the noun can largely be inferred from its ending: nouns ending in a consonant ("zero ending") are generally masculine (for example, град /ɡrat/ 'city', син /sin/ 'son', мъж /mɤʃ/ 'man'; those ending in –а/–я (-a/-ya) (жена /ʒɛˈna/ 'woman', дъщеря /dɐʃtɛrˈja/ 'daughter', улица /ˈulitsɐ/ 'street') are normally feminine; and nouns ending in –е, –о are almost always neuter (дете /dɛˈtɛ/ 'child', езеро /ˈɛzɛro/ 'lake'), as are those rare words (usually loanwords) that end in –и, –у, and –ю (цунами /tsuˈnami/ 'tsunami', табу /tɐˈbu/ 'taboo', меню /mɛˈnju/ 'menu'). Perhaps the most significant exception from the above are the relatively numerous nouns that end in a consonant and yet are feminine: these comprise, firstly, a large group of nouns with zero ending expressing quality, degree or an abstraction, including all nouns ending in –ост/–ест -{ost/est} (мъдрост /ˈmɤdrost/ 'wisdom', низост /ˈnizost/ 'vileness', прелест /ˈprɛlɛst/ 'loveliness', болест /ˈbɔlɛst/ 'sickness', любов /ljuˈbɔf/ 'love'), and secondly, a much smaller group of irregular nouns with zero ending which define tangible objects or concepts (кръв /krɤf/ 'blood', кост /kɔst/ 'bone', вечер /ˈvɛtʃɛr/ 'evening', нощ /nɔʃt/ 'night'). There are also some commonly used words that end in a vowel and yet are masculine: баща 'father', дядо 'grandfather', чичо / вуйчо 'uncle', and others.

The plural forms of the nouns do not express their gender as clearly as the singular ones, but may also provide some clues to it: the ending –и (-i) is more likely to be used with a masculine or feminine noun (факти /ˈfakti/ 'facts', болести /ˈbɔlɛsti/ 'sicknesses'), while one in –а/–я belongs more often to a neuter noun (езера /ɛzɛˈra/ 'lakes'). Also, the plural ending –ове /ovɛ/ occurs only in masculine nouns.

===== Number =====
Two numbers are distinguished in Bulgarian–singular and plural. A variety of plural suffixes is used, and the choice between them is partly determined by their ending in singular and partly influenced by gender; in addition, irregular declension and alternative plural forms are common. Words ending in –а/–я (which are usually feminine) generally have the plural ending –и, upon dropping of the singular ending. Of nouns ending in a consonant, the feminine ones also use –и, whereas the masculine ones usually have –и for polysyllables and –ове for monosyllables (however, exceptions are especially common in this group). Nouns ending in –о/–е (most of which are neuter) mostly use the suffixes –а, –я (both of which require the dropping of the singular endings) and –та.

With cardinal numbers and related words such as няколко ('several'), masculine nouns use a special count form in –а/–я, which stems from the Proto-Slavonic dual: два/три стола ('two/three chairs') versus тези столове ('these chairs'); cf. feminine две/три/тези книги ('two/three/these books') and neuter две/три/тези легла ('two/three/these beds'). However, a recently developed language norm requires that count forms should only be used with masculine nouns that do not denote persons. Thus, двама/трима ученици ('two/three students') is perceived as more correct than двама/трима ученика, while the distinction is retained in cases such as два/три молива ('two/three pencils') versus тези моливи ('these pencils').

===== Case =====
Cases exist only in the personal and some other pronouns (as they do in many other modern Indo-European languages), with nominative, accusative, dative and vocative forms. Vestiges are present in a number of phraseological units and sayings. The major exception are vocative forms, which are still in use for masculine (with the endings -е, -о and -ю) and feminine nouns (-[ь/й]о and -е) in the singular.

===== Definiteness (article) =====
In modern Bulgarian, definiteness is expressed by a definite article which is postfixed to the noun, much like in the Scandinavian languages or Romanian (indefinite: човек, 'person'; definite: човекът, "the person") or to the first nominal constituent of definite noun phrases (indefinite: добър човек, 'a good person'; definite: добрият човек, "the good person"). There are four singular definite articles. Again, the choice between them is largely determined by the noun's ending in the singular. Nouns that end in a consonant and are masculine use –ът/–ят, when they are grammatical subjects, and –а/–я elsewhere. Nouns that end in a consonant and are feminine, as well as nouns that end in –а/–я (most of which are feminine, too) use –та. Nouns that end in –е/–о use –то.

The plural definite article is –те for all nouns except for plural forms that end in –а/–я; getting –та instead. When postfixed to adjectives the definite articles are –ят/–я for masculine gender (again, with the longer form being reserved for grammatical subjects), –та for feminine gender, –то for neuter gender, and –те for plural.

==== Adjective and numeral inflection ====
Both groups agree in gender and number with the noun they are appended to. They may also take the definite article as explained above.

==== Pronouns ====
Pronouns may vary in gender, number, and definiteness, and are the only parts of speech that have retained case inflections. Three cases are exhibited by some groups of pronouns – nominative, accusative and dative. The distinguishable types of pronouns include the following: personal, relative, reflexive, interrogative, negative, indefinite, summative and possessive.

=== Verbal morphology and grammar ===
A Bulgarian verb has many distinct forms, as it varies in person, number, voice, aspect, mood, tense and in some cases gender.

==== Finite verbal forms ====
Finite verbal forms are simple or compound and agree with subjects in person (first, second and third) and number (singular, plural). In addition to that, past compound forms using participles vary in gender (masculine, feminine, neuter) and voice (active and passive) as well as aspect (perfective/aorist and imperfective).

==== Aspect ====
Bulgarian verbs express lexical aspect: perfective verbs signify the completion of the action of the verb and form past perfective (aorist) forms; imperfective ones are neutral with regard to it and form past imperfective forms. Most Bulgarian verbs can be grouped in perfective-imperfective pairs (imperfective/perfective: идвам/дойда "come", пристигам/пристигна "arrive"). Perfective verbs can be usually formed from imperfective ones by suffixation or prefixation, but the resultant verb often deviates in meaning from the original. In the pair examples above, aspect is stem-specific and therefore there is no difference in meaning.

In Bulgarian, there is also grammatical aspect. Three grammatical aspects are distinguishable: neutral, perfect and pluperfect. The neutral aspect comprises the three simple tenses and the future tense. The pluperfect is manifest in tenses that use double or triple auxiliary "be" participles like the past pluperfect subjunctive. Perfect constructions use a single auxiliary "be".

==== Mood ====
The traditional interpretation is that in addition to the four moods (наклонения /nəkloˈnɛnijɐ/) shared by most other European languages – indicative (изявително, /izʲəˈvitɛɫno/) imperative (повелително /poveˈlitelno/), subjunctive (подчинително /pottʃiˈnitɛɫno/) and conditional (условно, /oˈsɫɔvno/) – in Bulgarian there is one more to describe a general category of unwitnessed events – the inferential (преизказно /prɛˈiskɐzno/) mood. However, most contemporary Bulgarian linguists usually exclude the subjunctive mood and the inferential mood from the list of Bulgarian moods (thus placing the number of Bulgarian moods at a total of 3: indicative, imperative and conditional) and do not consider them to be moods but view them as verbial morphosyntactic constructs or separate gramemes of the verb class. The possible existence of a few other moods has been discussed in the literature. Most Bulgarian school grammars teach the traditional view of 4 Bulgarian moods (as described above, but excluding the subjunctive and including the inferential).

==== Tense ====
There are three grammatically distinctive positions in time – present, past and future – which combine with aspect and mood to produce a number of formations. Normally, in grammar books these formations are viewed as separate tenses – i. e. "past imperfect" would mean that the verb is in past tense, in the imperfective aspect, and in the indicative mood (since no other mood is shown). There are more than 40 different tenses across Bulgarian's two aspects and five moods.

In the indicative mood, there are three simple tenses:

- Present tense is a temporally unmarked simple form made up of the verbal stem and a complex suffix composed of the thematic vowel /ɛ/, /i/ or /a/ and the person/number ending (пристигам, /priˈstigɐm/, "I arrive/I am arriving"); only imperfective verbs can stand in the present indicative tense independently;
- Past imperfect is a simple verb form used to express an action which is contemporaneous or subordinate to other past actions; it is made up of an imperfective or a perfective verbal stem and the person/number ending (пристигах /priˈstiɡɐx/, пристигнех /priˈstiɡnɛx/, 'I was arriving');
- Past aorist is a simple form used to express a temporarily independent, specific past action; it is made up of a perfective or an imperfective verbal stem and the person/number ending (пристигнах, /priˈstiɡnɐx/, 'I arrived', четох, /ˈtʃɛtox/, 'I read');

In the indicative there are also the following compound tenses:

- Future tense is a compound form made of the particle ще /ʃtɛ/ and present tense (ще уча /ʃtɛ ˈutʃɐ/, 'I will study'); negation is expressed by the construction няма да /ˈɲamɐ dɐ/ and present tense (няма да уча /ˈɲamɐ dɐ ˈutʃɐ/, or the old-fashioned form не ще уча, /nɛ ʃtɛ ˈutʃɐ/ 'I will not study');
- Past future tense is a compound form used to express an action which was to be completed in the past but was future as regards another past action; it is made up of the past imperfect of the verb ща /ʃtɤ/ ('will'), the particle да /dɐ/ ('to') and the present tense of the verb (e.g. щях да уча, /ʃtʲax dɐ ˈutʃɐ/, 'I was going to study');
- Present perfect is a compound form used to express an action which was completed in the past but is relevant for or related to the present; it is made up of the present tense of the verb съм /sɤm/ ('be') and the past participle (e.g. съм учил /sɤm ˈutʃiɫ/, 'I have studied');
- Past perfect is a compound form used to express an action which was completed in the past and is relative to another past action; it is made up of the past tense of the verb съм and the past participle (e.g. бях учил /bʲax ˈutʃiɫ/, 'I had studied');
- Future perfect is a compound form used to express an action which is to take place in the future before another future action; it is made up of the future tense of the verb съм and the past participle (e.g. ще съм учил /ʃtɛ sɐm ˈutʃiɫ/, 'I will have studied');
- Past future perfect is a compound form used to express a past action which is future with respect to a past action which itself is prior to another past action; it is made up of the past imperfect of ща, the particle да the present tense of the verb съм and the past participle of the verb (e.g. щях да съм учил, /ʃtʲax dɐ sɐm ˈutʃiɫ/, 'I would have studied').

The four perfect constructions above can vary in aspect depending on the aspect of the main-verb participle; they are in fact pairs of imperfective and perfective aspects. Verbs in forms using past participles also vary in voice and gender.

There is only one simple tense in the imperative mood, the present, and there are simple forms only for the second-person singular, -и/-й (-i, -y/i), and plural, -ете/-йте (-ete, -yte), e.g. уча /ˈutʃɐ/ ('to study'): учи /oˈtʃi/, sg., учете /oˈtʃɛtɛ/, pl.; играя /ˈiɡrajɐ/ 'to play': играй /iɡˈraj/, играйте /iɡˈrajtɛ/. There are compound imperative forms for all persons and numbers in the present compound imperative (да играе, da iɡˈrae/), the present perfect compound imperative (да е играл, /dɐ ɛ iɡˈraɫ/) and the rarely used present pluperfect compound imperative (да е бил играл, /dɐ ɛ bil iɡˈraɫ/).

The conditional mood consists of five compound tenses, most of which are not grammatically distinguishable. The present, future and past conditional use a special past form of the stem би- (bi – "be") and the past participle (бих учил, /bix ˈutʃiɫ/, 'I would study'). The past future conditional and the past future perfect conditional coincide in form with the respective indicative tenses.

The subjunctive mood is rarely documented as a separate verb form in Bulgarian (being, morphologically, a sub-instance of the quasi-infinitive construction with the particle да and a normal finite verb form), but nevertheless it is used regularly. The most common form, often mistaken for the present tense, is the present subjunctive ([по-добре] да отида (ˈpɔdobrɛ) dɐ oˈtidɐ/, 'I had better go'). The difference between the present indicative and the present subjunctive tense is that the subjunctive can be formed by both perfective and imperfective verbs. It has completely replaced the infinitive and the supine from complex expressions (see below). It is also employed to express opinion about possible future events. The past perfect subjunctive ([по добре] да бях отишъл (ˈpɔdobrɛ) dɐ bʲax oˈtiʃɐl/, 'I'd had better be gone') refers to possible events in the past, which did not take place, and the present pluperfect subjunctive (да съм бил отишъл /dɐ sɐm bil oˈtiʃɐl/), which may be used about both past and future events arousing feelings of incontinence, suspicion, etc.

The inferential mood has five pure tenses. Two of them are simple – past aorist inferential and past imperfect inferential – and are formed by the past participles of perfective and imperfective verbs, respectively. There are also three compound tenses – past future inferential, past future perfect inferential and past perfect inferential. All these tenses' forms are gender-specific in the singular. There are also conditional and compound-imperative crossovers. The existence of inferential forms has been attributed to Turkic influences by most Bulgarian linguists. Morphologically, they are derived from the perfect.

==== Non-finite verbal forms ====
Bulgarian has the following participles:

- Present active participle (сегашно деятелно причастие) is formed from imperfective stems with the addition of the suffixes –ащ/–ещ/–ящ (четящ, 'reading') and is used only attributively;
- Present passive participle (сегашно страдателно причастие) is formed by the addition of the suffixes -им/аем/уем (четим, 'that can be read, readable');
- Past active aorist participle (минало свършено деятелно причастие) is formed by the addition of the suffix –л– to perfective stems (чел, '[have] read');
- Past active imperfect participle (минало несвършено деятелно причастие) is formed by the addition of the suffixes –ел/–ал/–ял to imperfective stems (четял, '[have been] reading');
- Past passive aorist participle' (минало свършено страдателно причастие) is formed from aorist/perfective stems with the addition of the suffixes -н/–т (прочетен, 'read'; убит, 'killed'); it is used predicatively and attributively;
- Past passive imperfect participle' (минало несвършено страдателно причастие) is formed from imperfective stems with the addition of the suffix –н (прочитан, '[been] read'; убиван, '[been] being killed'); it is used predicatively and attributively;
- Adverbial participle (деепричастие) is usually formed from imperfective present stems with the suffix –(е)йки (четейки, 'while reading'), relates an action contemporaneous with and subordinate to the main verb and is originally a Western Bulgarian form.

The participles are inflected by gender, number, and definiteness, and are coordinated with the subject when forming compound tenses (see tenses above). When used in an attributive role, the inflection attributes are coordinated with the noun that is being attributed.

==== Reflexive verbs ====
Bulgarian uses reflexive verbal forms (i.e. actions which are performed by the agent onto him- or herself) which behave in a similar way as they do in many other Indo-European languages, such as French and Spanish. The reflexive is expressed by the invariable particle se, (Note: Unlike in French and Spanish, where se is only used for the 3rd person, and other particles, such as me and te, are used for the 1st and 2nd persons singular, e.g. je me lave/me lavo – I wash myself.) originally a clitic form of the accusative reflexive pronoun. Thus –

- miya – I wash, miya se – I wash myself, miesh se – you wash yourself
- pitam – I ask, pitam se – I ask myself, pitash se – you ask yourself

When the action is performed on others, other particles are used, just like in any normal verb, e.g. –

- miya te – I wash you
- pitash me – you ask me

Sometimes, the reflexive verb form has a similar but not necessarily identical meaning to the non-reflexive verb –

- kazvam – I say, kazvam se – my name is (lit. 'I call myself')
- vizhdam – I see, vizhdame se – "we see ourselves" or "we meet each other"

In other cases, the reflexive verb has a completely different meaning from its non-reflexive counterpart –

- karam – to drive, karam se – to have a row with someone
- gotvya – to cook, gotvya se – to get ready
- smeya – to dare, smeya se – to laugh

Indirect actions

When the action is performed on an indirect object, the particles change to si and its derivatives –

- kazvam si – I say to myself, kazvash si – you say to yourself, kazvam ti – I say to you
- peya si – I am singing to myself, pee si – she is singing to herself, pee mu – she is singing to him
- gotvya si – I cook for myself, gotvyat si – they cook for themselves, gotvya im – I cook for them

In some cases, the particle si is ambiguous between the indirect object and the possessive meaning –

- miya si ratsete – I wash my hands, miya ti ratsete – I wash your hands
- pitam si priyatelite – I ask my friends, pitam ti priyatelite – I ask your friends
- iskam si topkata – I want my ball (back)

The difference between transitive and intransitive verbs can lead to significant differences in meaning with minimal change, e.g. –

- haresvash me – you like me, haresvash mi – I like you (lit. you are pleasing to me)
- otivam – I am going, otivam si – I am going home

The particle si is often used to indicate a more personal relationship to the action, e.g. –

- haresvam go – I like him, haresvam si go – no precise translation, roughly translates as "he's really close to my heart"
- stanahme priyateli – we became friends, stanahme si priyateli – same meaning, but sounds friendlier
- mislya – I am thinking (usually about something serious), mislya si – same meaning, but usually about something personal and/or trivial

=== Adverbs ===
The most productive way to form adverbs is to derive them from the neuter singular form of the corresponding adjective—e.g. бързо (fast), силно (hard), странно (strange)—but adjectives ending in -ки use the masculine singular form (i.e. ending in -ки), instead—e.g. юнашки (heroically), мъжки (bravely, like a man), майсторски (skillfully). The same pattern is used to form adverbs from the (adjective-like) ordinal numerals, e.g. първо (firstly), второ (secondly), трето (thirdly), and in some cases from (adjective-like) cardinal numerals, e.g. двойно (twice as/double), тройно (three times as), петорно (five times as).

The remaining adverbs are formed in ways that are no longer productive in the language. A small number are original (not derived from other words), for example: тук (here), там (there), вътре (inside), вън (outside), много (very/much) etc. The rest are mostly fossilized case forms, such as:

- Archaic locative forms of some adjectives, e.g. добре (well), зле (badly), твърде (too, rather), and nouns горе (up), утре (tomorrow), лете (in the summer), зиме (in winter)
- Archaic instrumental forms of some adjectives, e.g. тихом (quietly), скришом (furtively), слепешком (blindly), and nouns, e.g. денем (during the day), нощем (during the night), редом (one next to the other), духом (spiritually), цифром (in figures), словом (with words); or verbs: тичешком (while running), лежешком (while lying), стоешком (while standing)
- Archaic accusative forms of some nouns: днес (today), нощес (tonight), сутрин (in the morning), зимъс (in winter)
- Archaic genitive forms of some nouns: довечера (tonight), снощи (last night), вчера (yesterday)
- Homonymous and etymologically identical to the feminine singular form of the corresponding adjective used with the definite article: здравата (hard), слепешката (gropingly); the same pattern has been applied to some verbs, e.g. тичешката (while running), лежешката (while lying), стоешката (while standing)
- Derived from cardinal numerals by means of a non-productive suffix: веднъж (once), дваж (twice), триж (thrice)

Adverbs can sometimes be reduplicated to emphasize the qualitative or quantitative properties of actions, moods or relations as performed by the subject of the sentence: "бавно-бавно" ("rather slowly"), "едва-едва" ("with great difficulty"), "съвсем-съвсем" ("quite", "thoroughly").

=== Other features ===
==== Questions ====
Questions in Bulgarian which do not use a question word (such as who? what? etc.) are formed with the particle ли after the verb; a subject is not necessary, as the verbal conjugation suggests who is performing the action:

- Идваш – 'you are coming'; Идваш ли? – 'are you coming?'

While the particle ли generally goes after the verb, it can go after a noun or adjective if a contrast is needed:

- Идваш ли с нас? – 'are you coming with us?';
- С нас ли идваш? – 'are you coming with us'?

A verb is not always necessary, e.g. when presenting a choice:

- Той ли? – 'him?'; Жълтият ли? – 'the yellow one?' (Note: The word или ('either') has a similar etymological root: и + ли ('and') – e.g. (или) Жълтият или червеният – '(either) the yellow one or the red one.')

Rhetorical questions can be formed by adding ли to a question word, thus forming a "double interrogative" –

- Кой? – 'Who?'; Кой ли?! – 'I wonder who(?)'

The same construction +не ('no') is an emphasized positive –

- Кой беше там? – 'Who was there?' – Кой ли не! – 'Nearly everyone!' (lit. 'I wonder who wasn't there')

==== Significant verbs ====
===== Be (Съм) =====
The verb съм /sɤm/ (Note: съм is pronounced similar to English "sum".) – 'to be' is also used as an auxiliary for forming the perfect, the passive and the conditional:

- past tense – /oˈdariɫ sɐm/ – 'I have hit'
- passive – /oˈdarɛn sɐm/ – 'I am hit'
- past passive – /bʲax oˈdarɛn/ – 'I was hit'
- conditional – /bix oˈdaril/ – 'I would hit'

Two alternate forms of съм exist:

- бъда /ˈbɤdɐ/ – interchangeable with съм in most tenses and moods, but never in the present indicative – e.g. /ˈiskɐm dɐ ˈbɤdɐ/ ('I want to be'), /ʃtɛ ˈbɤdɐ tuk/ ('I will be here'); in the imperative, only бъда is used – /bɤˈdi tuk/ ('be here');
- бивам /ˈbivɐm/ – slightly archaic, imperfective form of бъда – e.g. /ˈbivɐʃɛ zaˈplaʃɛn/ ('he used to get threats'); in contemporary usage, it is mostly used in the negative to mean "ought not", e.g. /nɛ ˈbivɐ dɐ ˈpuʃiʃ/ ('you shouldn't smoke'). (Note: It is a common reply to the question Kak e? /ˈkak ɛ/ 'How are things?' (lit. 'how is it?') – /ˈbivɐ/ 'alright' (lit. 'it [repetitively] is') or /ˈkak si/ 'How are you?' -/ˈbivɐm/ 'I'm OK'.)

===== Will (Ще) =====
The impersonal verb ще (lit. 'it wants') (Note: ще – from the verb ща – 'to want.' The present tense of this verb in the sense of 'to want' is archaic and only used colloquially. Instead, искам /ˈiskɐm/ is used.) is used to for forming the (positive) future tense:

- /oˈtivɐm/ – 'I am going'
- /ʃtɛ oˈtivɐm/ – 'I will be going'

The negative future is formed with the invariable construction няма да /ˈɲamɐ dɐ/ (see няма below): (Note: Formed from the impersonal verb няма (lit. 'it does not have') and the subjunctive particle да /dɐ/ ('that'))

- /ˈɲamɐ dɐ oˈtivɐm/ – 'I will not be going'

The past tense of this verb – щях /ʃtʲax/ is conjugated to form the past conditional ('would have' – again, with да, since it is irrealis):

- /ʃtʲax dɐ oˈtidɐ/ – 'I would have gone;' /ʃtɛʃɛ da otidɛʃ/ 'you would have gone'

===== Have/Don't have (Имам and нямам) =====
The verbs имам /ˈimɐm/ ('to have') and нямам /ˈɲamɐm/ ('to not have'):

- the third person singular of these two can be used impersonally to mean 'there is/there are' or 'there isn't/aren't any,' (Note: They can also be used on their own as a reply, with no object following: има – 'there are some'; /ˈɲamɐ/ – 'there aren't any' – compare German keine.) e.g.
  - /imɐ ˈvrɛmɛ/ ('there is still time' – compare Spanish hay);
  - /ˈɲamɐ ˈnikoɡo/ ('there is no one there').
- The impersonal form няма is used in the negative future – (see ще above).
  - няма used on its own can mean simply 'I won't' – a simple refusal to a suggestion or instruction.

==== Conjunctions and particles ====
===== But =====
In Bulgarian, there are several conjunctions all translating into English as "but", which are all used in distinct situations. They are но (no), ама (amà), а (a), ами (amì), and ала (alà) (and обаче (obache) – "however", identical in use to но).

While there is some overlapping between their uses, in many cases they are specific. For example, ami is used for a choice – ne tova, ami onova – "not this one, but that one" (compare Spanish sino), while ama is often used to provide extra information or an opinion – kazah go, ama sgreshih – "I said it, but I was wrong". Meanwhile, a provides contrast between two situations, and in some sentences can even be translated as "although", "while" or even "and" – az rabotya, a toy blee – "I'm working, and he's daydreaming".

Very often, different words can be used to alter the emphasis of a sentence – e.g. while pusha, no ne tryabva and pusha, a ne tryabva both mean "I smoke, but I shouldn't", the first sounds more like a statement of fact ("...but I mustn't"), while the second feels more like a judgement ("...but I oughtn't"). Similarly, az ne iskam, ama toy iska and az ne iskam, a toy iska both mean "I don't want to, but he does", however the first emphasizes the fact that he wants to, while the second emphasizes the wanting rather than the person.

Ala is interesting in that, while it feels archaic, it is often used in poetry and frequently in children's stories, since it has quite a moral/ominous feel to it.

Some common expressions use these words, and some can be used alone as interjections:

- da, ama ne (lit. 'yes, but no') – means "you're wrong to think so".
- ama can be tagged onto a sentence to express surprise: ama toy spi! – "he's sleeping!"
- ами! – "you don't say!", "really!"

===== Vocative particles =====
Bulgarian has several abstract particles which are used to strengthen a statement. These have no precise translation in English. (Note: Perhaps most similar in use is the tag "man", but the Bulgarian particles are more abstract still.) The particles are strictly informal and can even be considered rude by some people and in some situations. They are mostly used at the end of questions or instructions.

- бе (be) – the most common particle. It can be used to strengthen a statement or, sometimes, to indicate derision of an opinion, aided by the tone of voice. (Originally purely masculine, it can now be used towards both men and women.)
  - kazhi mi, be – tell me (insistence); taka li, be? – is that so? (derisive); vyarno li, be? – you don't say!.
- де (de) – expresses urgency, sometimes pleading.
  - stavay, de! – come on, get up!
- ма (ma) (feminine only) – originally simply the feminine counterpart of be, but today perceived as rude and derisive (compare the similar evolution of the vocative forms of feminine names).
- бре (bre, masculine), мари (mari, feminine) – similar to be and ma, but archaic. Although informal, can sometimes be heard being used by older people.

===== Modal particles =====
These are "tagged" on to the beginning or end of a sentence to express the mood of the speaker in relation to the situation. They are mostly interrogative or slightly imperative in nature. There is no change in the grammatical mood when these are used (although they may be expressed through different grammatical moods in other languages).

- нали (nalì) – is a universal affirmative tag, like "isn't it"/"won't you", etc. (it is invariable, like the French n'est-ce pas). It can be placed almost anywhere in the sentence, and does not always require a verb:
  - shte doydesh, nali? – you are coming, aren't you?; nali iskaha? – didn't they want to?; nali onzi? – that one, right?;
  - it can express quite complex thoughts through simple constructions – nali nyamashe? – "I thought you weren't going to!" or "I thought there weren't any!" (depending on context – the verb nyama presents general negation/lacking, see "nyama", above).
- дали (dalì) – expresses uncertainty (if in the middle of a clause, can be translated as "whether") – e.g. dali shte doyde? – "do you think he will come?"
- нима (nimà) – presents disbelief ~"don't tell me that ..." – e.g. nima iskash?! – "don't tell me you want to!". It can be used on its own as an interjection – nima!
- дано (danò) – expresses wish – shte doyde – "he will come"; dano doyde – "may he come". Grammatically, dano is entirely separate from the verb желая (zhelàya) – "to wish".
- нека (nèka) – means "let('s)" – e.g. neka doyde – "let him come"; when used in the first person, it expresses extreme politeness: neka da otidem... – "let us go" (in colloquial situations, hayde, below, is used instead).
  - neka, as an interjection, can also be used to express judgement or even schadenfreude – neka mu! – "he deserves it!".

===== Intentional particles =====
These express intent or desire, perhaps even pleading. They can be seen as a sort of cohortative side to the language. (Since they can be used by themselves, they could even be considered as verbs in their own right.) They are also highly informal.

- хайде (hàide) – "come on", "let's"
  - e.g. hayde, po-barzo – "faster!"
- я (ya) – "let me" – exclusively when asking someone else for something. It can even be used on its own as a request or instruction (depending on the tone used), indicating that the speaker wants to partake in or try whatever the listener is doing.
  - ya da vidya – let me see; ya? or ya! – "let me.../give me..."
- недей (nedèi) (plural nedèyte) – can be used to issue a negative instruction – e.g. nedey da idvash – "don't come" (nedey + subjunctive). In some dialects, the construction nedey idva (nedey + preterite) is used instead. As an interjection – nedei! – "don't!" (See section on imperative mood).

These particles can be combined with the vocative particles for greater effect, e.g. ya da vidya, be (let me see), or even exclusively in combinations with them, with no other elements, e.g. hayde, de! (come on!); nedey, de! (I told you not to!).

==== Pronouns of quality ====
Bulgarian has several pronouns of quality which have no direct parallels in English – kakav (what sort of); takuv (this sort of); onakuv (that sort of – colloq.); nyakakav (some sort of); nikakav (no sort of); vsyakakav (every sort of); and the relative pronoun kakavto (the sort of ... that ... ). The adjective ednakuv ("the same") derives from the same radical. (Note: Like the demonstratives, these take the same form as pronouns as they do as adjectives – ie. takuv means both "this kind of ..." (adj.) and this kind of person/thing (pron., depending on the context).)

Example phrases include:

- kakav chovek?! – "what person?!"; kakav chovek e toy? – what sort of person is he?
- ne poznavam takuv – "I don't know any (people like that)" (lit. "I don't know this sort of (person)")
- nyakakvi hora – lit. "some type of people", but the understood meaning is "a bunch of people I don't know"
- vsyakakvi hora – "all sorts of people"
- kakav iskash? – "which type do you want?"; nikakav! – "I don't want any!"/"none!"

An interesting phenomenon is that these can be strung along one after another in quite long constructions, e.g.

word	literal meaning	sentence	meaning of sentence as a whole
–	–	edna kola	a car
takava	this sort of	edna takava kola ...	this car (that I'm trying to describe)
nikakva	no sort of	edna takava nikakva kola	this worthless car (that I'm trying to describe)
nyakakva	some sort of	edna takava nyakakva nikakva kola	this sort of worthless car (that I'm trying to describe)

An extreme, albeit colloquial, example with almost no intrinsic lexical meaning – yet which is meaningful to the Bulgarian ear – would be :

- "kakva e taya takava edna nyakakva nikakva?!"
- inferred translation – "what kind of no-good person is she?"
- literal translation: "what kind of – is – this one here (she) – this sort of – one – some sort of – no sort of"

The subject of the sentence is simply the pronoun "taya" (lit. "this one here"; colloq. "she").

Another interesting phenomenon that is observed in colloquial speech is the use of takova (neuter of takyv) not only as a substitute for an adjective, but also as a substitute for a verb. In that case the base form takova is used as the third person singular in the present indicative and all other forms are formed by analogy to other verbs in the language. Sometimes the "verb" may even acquire a derivational prefix that changes its meaning. Examples:

- takovah ti shapkata – I did something to your hat (perhaps: I took your hat)
- takovah si ochilata – I did something to my glasses (perhaps: I lost my glasses)
- takovah se – I did something to myself (perhaps: I hurt myself)

Another use of takova in colloquial speech is the word takovata, which can be used as a substitution for a noun, but also, if the speaker does not remember or is not sure how to say something, they might say takovata and then pause to think about it:

- i posle toy takovata... – and then he [no translation] ...
- izyadoh ti takovata – I ate something of yours (perhaps: I ate your dessert). Here the word takovata is used as a substitution for a noun.

As a result of this versatility, the word takova can readily be used as a euphemism for taboo subjects. It is commonly used to substitute, for example, words relating to reproductive organs or sexual acts:

- toy si takova takovata v takovata i - he [verb] his [noun] in her [noun]

Similar "meaningless" expressions are extremely common in spoken Bulgarian, especially when the speaker is finding it difficult to describe or express something.

==== Miscellaneous ====
- The commonly cited phenomenon of Bulgarian people shaking their head for "yes" and nodding for "no" is true, but the shaking and nodding are not identical to the Western gestures. The "nod" for no is actually an upward movement of the head rather than a downward one, while the shaking of the head for yes is not completely horizontal, but also has a slight "wavy" aspect to it. This makes the Bulgarian gestures for yes and no compatible with the Western ones, and allows one to use either system unambiguously.
  - A dental click [ǀ] (similar to the English "tsk") also means "no" (informal), as does ъ-ъ [ʔəʔə] (the only occurrence in Bulgarian of the glottal stop). The two are often said with the upward 'nod'.
  - The head-shaking gesture used to signify "no" in Western Europe may also be used interrogatively, with the meaning of "what is it?" or "what's wrong?".
- Bulgarian has an extensive vocabulary covering family relationships. The biggest range of words is for uncles and aunts, e.g. chicho (your father's brother), vuicho (your mother's brother), svako (your aunt's husband); an even larger number of synonyms for these three exists in the various dialects of Bulgarian, including kaleko, lelincho, tetin, etc. The words do not only refer to the closest members of the family (such as brat – brother, but batko/bate – older brother, sestra – sister, but kaka – older sister), but extend to its furthest reaches, e.g. badzhanak from Turkish bacanak (the relationship of the husbands of two sisters to each other) and etarva (the relationships of two brothers' wives to each other). For all in-laws, there are specific names, e.g. a woman's husband's brother is her dever and her husband's sister is her zalva. In the traditional rural extended family before 1900, there existed separate subcategories for different brothers-in-law/sisters-in-law of a woman with regard to their age relative to hers, e.g. instead of simply a dever there could be a braino (older), a draginko (younger), or an ubavenkyo (who is still a child).
- As with many Slavic languages, the double negative in Bulgarian is grammatically correct, while some forms of it, when used instead of a single negative form, are grammatically incorrect. The following are literal translations of grammatically correct Bulgarian sentences that utilize a double or multiple negation: "Никой никъде никога нищо не е направил." (multiple negation without the use of a compound double negative form, i.e. using a listing of several successive single negation words) – "Nobody never nowhere nothing did not do." (translated as "nobody has ever done anything, anywhere"); "Никога не съм бил там." (double negation without the use of a compound double negative form, i.e. using a listing of several successive single negation words) – I never did not go there ("[I] have never been there"); Никога никакви чувства не съм имал! – I never no feelings had not have! (I have never had any feelings!). The same applies for Macedonian.

== Syntax ==
Bulgarian employs clitic doubling, mostly for emphatic purposes. For example, the following constructions are common in colloquial Bulgarian:

Аз (го) дадох подаръка на Мария.
(lit. "I gave it the present to Maria.")

Аз (ѝ го) дадох подаръка на Мария.
(lit. "I gave her it the present to Maria.")

The phenomenon is practically obligatory in the spoken language in the case of inversion signalling information structure (in writing, clitic doubling may be skipped in such instances, with a somewhat bookish effect):

Подаръка (ѝ) го дадох на Мария.
(lit. "The present [to her] it I-gave to Maria.")

На Мария ѝ (го) дадох подаръка.
(lit. "To Maria to her [it] I-gave the present.")

Sometimes, the doubling signals syntactic relations, thus:

Петър и Иван ги изядоха вълците.
(lit. "Petar and Ivan them ate the wolves.")
Transl.: "Petar and Ivan were eaten by the wolves".

This is contrasted with:

Петър и Иван изядоха вълците.
(lit. 'Petar and Ivan ate the wolves')
Transl.: "Petar and Ivan ate the wolves".

In this case, clitic doubling can be a colloquial alternative of the more formal or bookish passive voice, which would be constructed as follows:

Петър и Иван бяха изядени от вълците.
(lit. 'Petar and Ivan were eaten by the wolves.')

Clitic doubling is also fully obligatory, both in the spoken and in the written norm, in clauses including several special expressions that use the short accusative and dative pronouns such as "играе ми се" (I feel like playing), студено ми е (I am cold), and боли ме ръката (my arm hurts):

На мен ми се спи, а на Иван му се играе.
(lit. "To me to me it-feels-like-sleeping, and to Ivan to him it-feels-like-playing")
Transl.: "I feel like sleeping, and Ivan feels like playing."
На нас ни е студено, а на вас ви е топло.
(lit. "To us to us it-is cold, and to you-plur. to you-plur. it-is warm")
Transl.: "We are cold, and you are warm."
Иван го боли гърлото, а мене ме боли главата.
(lit. Ivan him aches the throat, and me me aches the head)
Transl.: Ivan has sore throat, and I have a headache.

Except the above examples, clitic doubling is considered inappropriate in a formal context.

== Vocabulary ==
Most of the vocabulary of modern Bulgarian consists of terms inherited from Proto-Slavic and local Bulgarian innovations and formations of those through the mediation of Old and Middle Bulgarian. The native terms in Bulgarian account for 70% to 80% of the lexicon.

The remaining 20% to 30% are loanwords from a number of languages, as well as derivations of such words. Bulgarian adopted also a few words of Thracian and Bulgar origin. The languages which have contributed most to Bulgarian as a way of foreign vocabulary borrowings are:

- Latin 26%,
- Greek 23%,
- French 15%,
- Ottoman Turkish (including Arabic via Ottoman Turkish) 14%,
- Russian 10%,
- Italian 4%,
- German 4%,
- English 4%.

The classical languages Latin and Greek are the source of many words, used mostly in international terminology. Many Latin terms entered Bulgarian during the time when present-day Bulgaria was part of the Roman Empire and also in the later centuries through Romanian, Aromanian, and Megleno-Romanian during Bulgarian Empires. The loanwords of Greek origin in Bulgarian are a product of the influence of the liturgical language of the Orthodox Church. Many of the numerous loanwords from another Turkic language, Ottoman Turkish and, via Ottoman Turkish, from Arabic were adopted into Bulgarian during the long period of Ottoman rule, but have been replaced with native Bulgarian terms. Furthermore, after the independence of Bulgaria from the Ottoman Empire in 1878, Bulgarian intellectuals imported many French language vocabulary. In addition, both specialized (usually coming from the field of science) and commonplace English words (notably abstract, commodity/service-related or technical terms) have also penetrated Bulgarian since the second half of the 20th century, especially since 1989. A noteworthy portion of this English-derived terminology has attained some unique features in the process of its introduction to native speakers, and this has resulted in peculiar derivations that set the newly formed loanwords apart from the original words (mainly in pronunciation), although many loanwords are completely identical to the source words. A growing number of international neologisms are also being widely adopted, causing controversy between younger generations who, in general, are raised in the era of digital globalization, and the older, more conservative educated purists.

Bulgarian lexis according to word origin
Directly inherited from Proto-Slavic	50%
Later formations	30%
Foreign borrowings	17%

Foreign borrowings in Bulgarian (1955–59)
Latin	26%
Greek	23%
French	15%
Ottoman Turkish, Arabic	14%
Russian	10%
Italian	4%
German	4%
English	4%
Other	2%

== Sample text ==
Bulgarian pronunciation

Article 1 of the Universal Declaration of Human Rights in Bulgarian:

Всички хора се раждат свободни и равни по достойнство и права. Те са надарени с разум и съвест и следва да се отнасят помежду си в дух на братство.

The romanization of the text into Latin alphabet:

Vsichki hora se razhdat svobodni i ravni po dostoynstvo i prava. Te sa nadareni s razum i sŭvest i sledva da se otnasyat pomezhdu si v duh na bratstvo.

Bulgarian pronunciation transliterated in broad IPA:

['fsit͡ʃki 'xɔrɐ sɛ 'raʒdɐt svo'bɔdni i 'ravni po dos'tɔjnstvo i prɐ'va. 'tɛ sɐ nɐdɐ'rɛni s 'razom i 'sɤvɛst i 'slɛdvɐ dɐ sɛ ot'nasjɐt pomɛʒ'du si v 'dux nɐ 'bratstvo.]

Article 1 of the Universal Declaration of Human Rights in English:

All human beings are born free and equal in dignity and rights. They are endowed with reason and conscience and should act towards one another in a spirit of brotherhood.

== Gallery ==
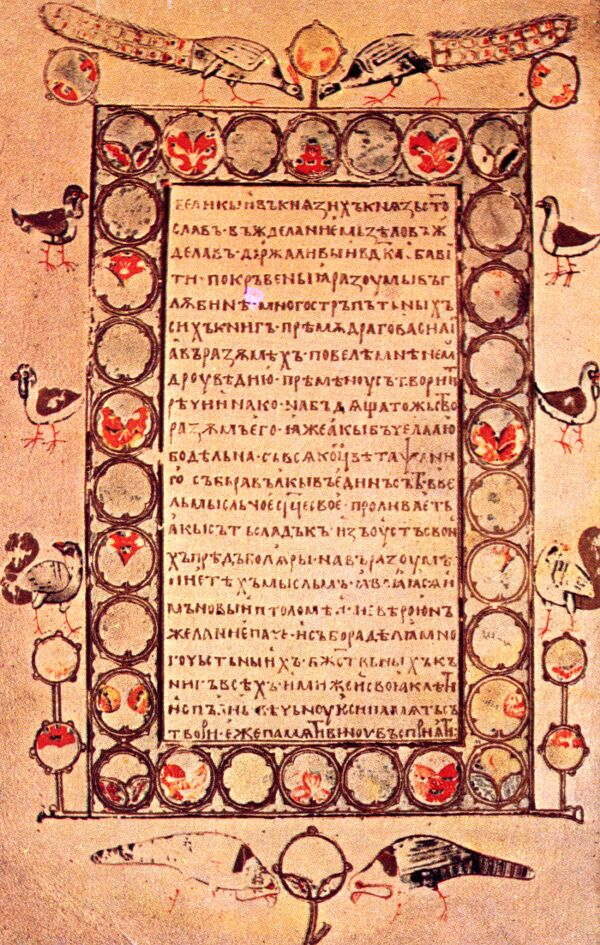
Simeon Laudatio written in Old Bulgarian

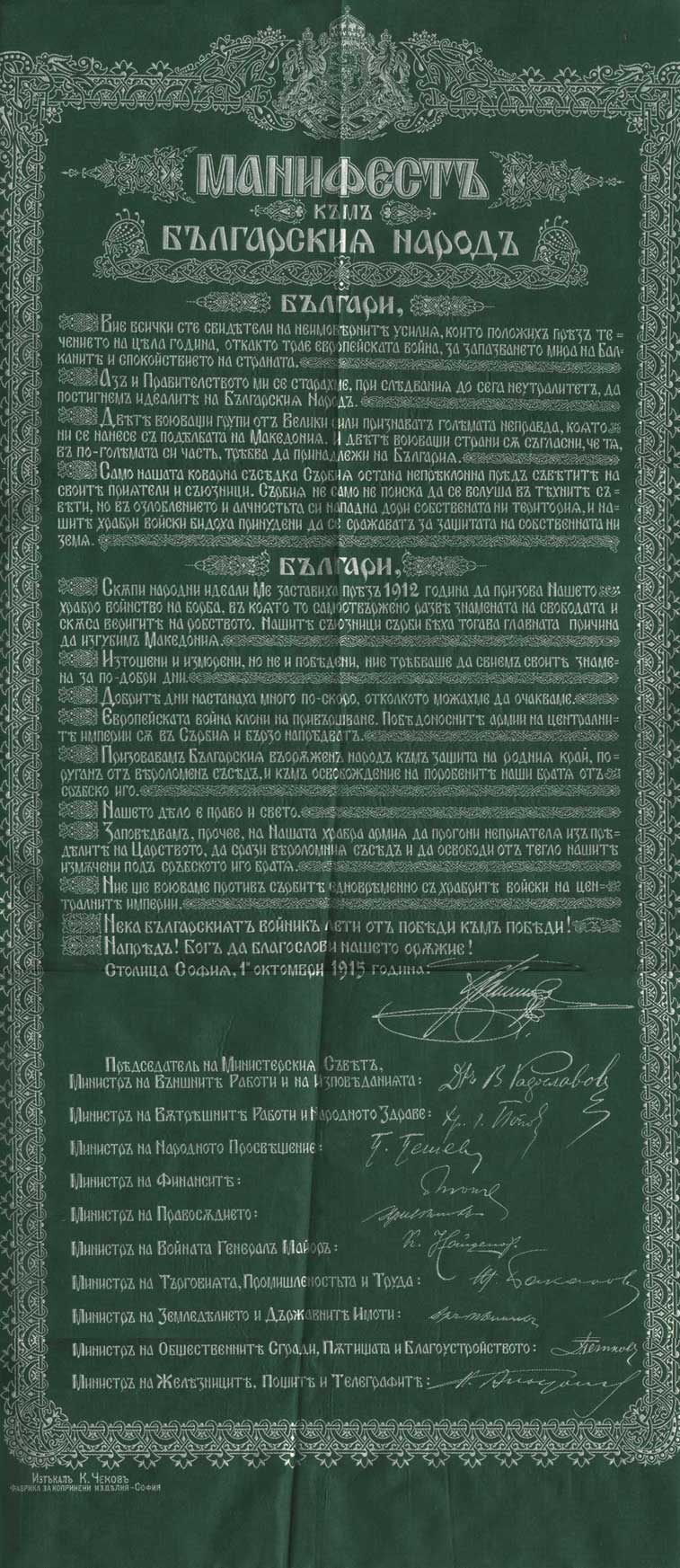
Manifesto of tsar Ferdinand I of Bulgaria declaring war on Serbia and entering the First World War

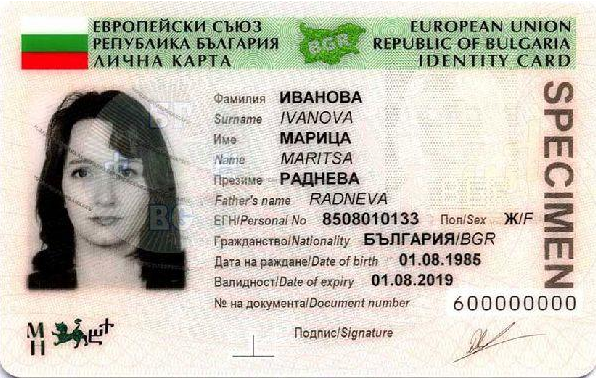
Bulgarian identity card

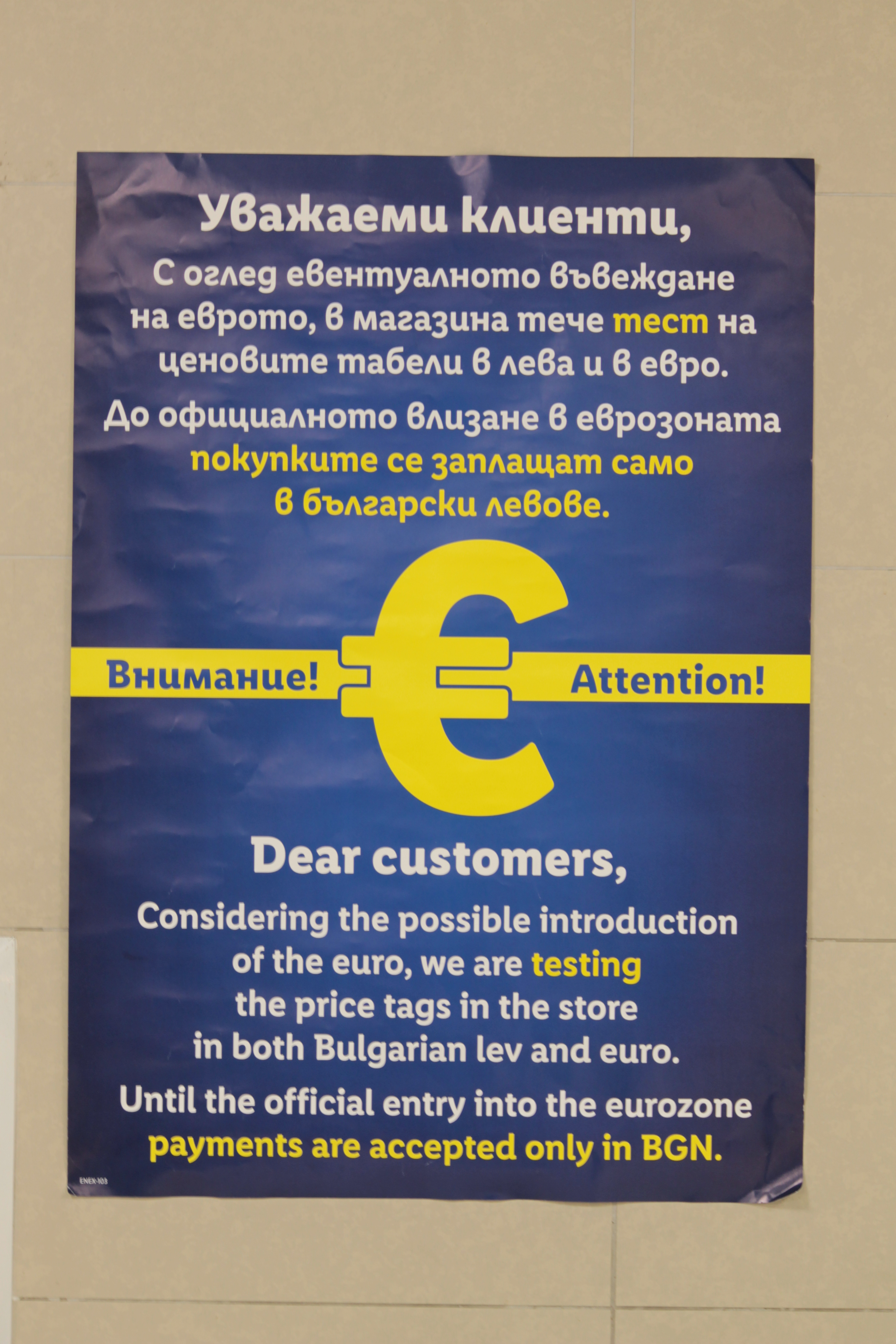
Lidl poster from 2025 informing customers of the dual price labels in Bulgarian lev and in euro

== See also ==
- Abstand and ausbau languages
- Banat Bulgarian language
- The BABEL Speech Corpus
- Bulgarian name
- Macedonian language
- Slavic language (Greece)
- Swadesh list of Slavic languages
- Torlakian dialect

== Bibliography ==
- Pisani, Vittore (2012). Old Bulgarian Language. Sofia: Bukvitza. ISBN 978-9549285864. Archived from the original on 5 March 2016.
- Comrie, Bernard; Corbett, Greville G. (1993). The Slavonic Languages. Routledge. ISBN 978-0-415-04755-5.
- Klagstad Jr., Harold L. (1958), The Phonemic System of Colloquial Standard Bulgarian, American Association of Teachers of Slavic and East European Languages, pp. 42–54
- Ternes, Elmer; Vladimirova-Buhtz, Tatjana (1999), "Bulgarian", Handbook of the International Phonetic Association, Cambridge University Press, pp. 55–57, ISBN 978-0-521-63751-0
- Бояджиев и др. (1998) Граматика на съвременния български книжовен език. Том 1. Фонетика
- Жобов, Владимир (2004) Звуковете в българския език
- Кръстев, Боримир (1992) Граматика за всички
- Пашов, Петър (1999) Българска граматика
- Vladimir I. Georgiev; et al., eds. (1971–2011), Български етимологичен речник [Bulgarian etymological dictionary], vol. I–VII, Българска академия на науките
- Notes on the Grammar of the Bulgarian language – 1844 – Smyrna (now İzmir) – Elias Riggs
