= Erich Berneker =

Erich Berneker (3 February 1874 – 15 March 1937) was a German linguist, Slavicist and Balticist. He was part of the Neogrammarian school.
