= Ishtiqaq =

Ishtiqaq is the Arabic term for "derivation" or "etymology". It may refer to

- a branch of traditional Arabic grammar, see Arabic grammar
- a 9th-century work by Ibn Qutaybah
- Kitab ul-Ishtiqaq, a 10th-century work by Ibn Duraid.
- a lost work by Abu Ishaq al-Shatibi (d. 1388)
