= Etymological Dictionary of the Finnish Language =

Finnish etymological dictionary

- Author: Yrjö Toivonen, Erkki Itkonen, Aulis J. Joki, Reino Peltola, Satu Tanner, Marita Cronstedt
- Original title: Suomen kielen etymologinen sanakirja
- Language: Finnish
- Genre: Dictionary
- Published: 1955–1981
- Publisher: Finno-Ugrian Society
- Publication place: Finland
- Pages: 2293

Etymological Dictionary of the Finnish Language (or Suomen kielen etymologinen sanakirja) was started in the 1950s and completed in the 1980s. Its seven volumes have a total of 2293 pages. The first two parts of the work were published in 1955 by Professor Y.H. Toivonen and the next part in 1958 by Erkki Itkonen. Then, the project was stopped for twenty years, until its fifth part appeared in 1975, and in a short time the rest of the parts.
