= Hjalmar Falk =

Norwegian linguist

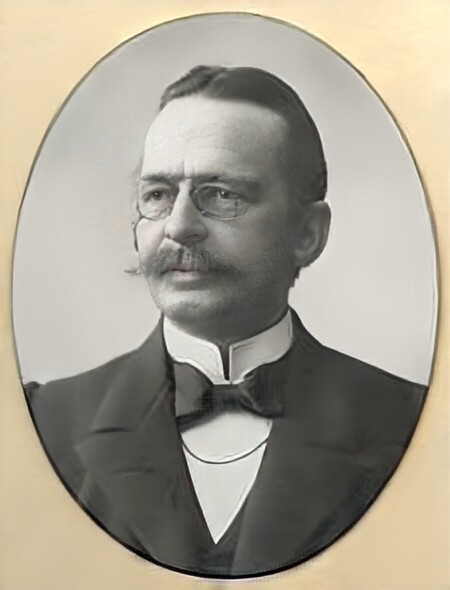
- Falk, portrayed by Ludvig Forbech
- Born: 2 April 1859; Vang, Norway
- Died: 2 November 1928 (aged 69); Oslo
- Occupations: Linguist; Philologist
- Notable work: Etymologisk ordbog over det norske og danske sprog
- Awards: Crown Prince Gold Medal (1885); Order of St. Olav (1911)

Peterolsen Groth Hjalmar Seierstedt Falk (2 April 1859 – 2 November 1928) was a Norwegian linguist and philologist.

A professor of philology at the University in Kristiania for about thirty years, he is particularly known for his etymological dictionary of the Norwegian and Danish language in cooperation with Alf Torp.

== Early life and education ==
Falk's Riksmal guide (32 questions and answers about the language controversy)

Falk was born in Vang Municipality in Hedmark on 2 April 1859, a son of merchant Gustav Falk and Dorothea Margarethe Sejersted. In 1903 he married Laura Caroline Staff.

He started his university studies in 1876 and graduated with an education degree in languages and history in 1882. After this he taught in Oslo while continuing research, especially on Germanic languages and Nordic mythology, including scholarship stays in Germany and England. Falk received the Crown Prince Gold Medal in 1885 and was appointed a docent. He received his doctorate in 1888 with the dissertation Om nomina agentis i det oldnorske Sprog (Nomina Agentis in Old Norwegian).

== Academic career ==
Falk became a professor of Germanic philology at the University of Oslo in 1897. As a university instructor, especially a German instructor, he strove for more practical and modern language teaching. He published a number of works on linguistics, philology, and cultural history, especially in Nordisk Arkiv for Filologi and in materials published by the Norwegian Academy of Science and Letters in Oslo. He is particularly remembered for his etymological dictionary of the Norwegian and Danish language, which he wrote in cooperation with Alf Torp. He chaired the commission that recommended/prepared the orthography revision of 1917. He was decorated Knight, First Class of the Order of St. Olav.

He died in Oslo on 2 November 1928.

== Selected works ==
- Vanskabninger i det norske sprog, populaere foredrag (Errors in Norwegian, Popular Lectures, 1893)
- Sprogets visne blomster: fortsættelse af "Vanskabninger i det norske sprog." (The Language's Withered Flowers: A Continiation of "Errors in Norwegian", 1894)
- Kulturminder i Ord (Culture Memories in Words, 1900)

== Positions and awards ==
- Chair of the Norwegian Students' Society (1895)
- Dean of the Faculty of History and Arts (1906–1909)
- Election to and chair of the Norwegian Academy of Science and Letters
- Knight, First Class of the Order of St. Olav (1911)

== See also ==
- Magnus Olsen
