= Ferdinand Holthausen =

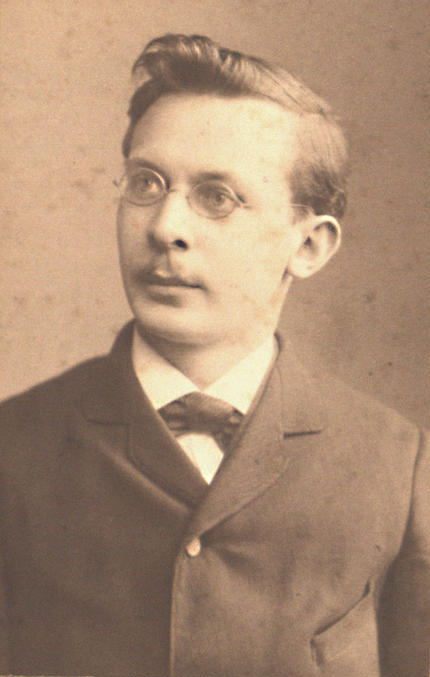
Ferdinand Holthausen

Ferdinand Holthausen (born 9 September 1860 in Soest, died 19 September 1956 in Wiesbaden) was a German scholar of English and old Germanic languages.

== Life ==
Holthausen received his doctorate in 1884 from Universität Leipzig with his thesis Studien zur Thidrekssaga. He received his Habilitation in 1885 at Heidelberg. He then helds posts at Göttingen (1888) and Gießen (1891), before becoming Professor für Altgermanistik (professor of Ancient Germanic studies) at the University of Gothenburg. From 1900 until his retirement in 1925, he was Professor ordinarius for English studies at Universität Kiel. He then became an emeritus professor, but from 1927 to 1935 he was also a guest professor at Universität Frankfurt.

Holthausen was involved in research and teaching in the entire Germanic-speaking region around the North and Baltic Seas, though his research focus was in Old English and Old Icelandic literature.

== Key works ==
- Studien zur Thidrekssaga (Halle a. S. 1884).
- Lehrbuch der altisländischen Sprache, 2 vols (Weimar: Felber, 1895–96), vol. I, vol. II.
- Altsächsisches Elementarbuch, (Heidelberg: Winter, 1899).
- Etymologisches Wörterbuch der Englischen Sprache, 3rd edn (Göttingen: Vandenhoeck & Ruprecht, 1949) [first published 1917].
- Altenglisches etymologisches Wörterbuch, Germanische Bibliothek, 4. Reihe (Wörterbücher), 7 (Heidelberg, 1934).
- Gotisches etymologisches Wörterbuch, 1934.
- Altsächsisches Wörterbuch, Niederdeutsche Studien, 1, 2nd edn (Köln, 1967) [first published 1954].
