= Harald Bjorvand =

Norwegian linguist

Harald Bjorvand (born 30 July 1942) is a Norwegian linguist.

He was born in Askim, and graduated from the University of Oslo in 1970. He was a research fellow at the same institution from 1972 to 1974, amanuensis from 1974 to 1987, associate professor from 1987, and professor from 1990. He took the Doctor of Philosophy degree in 1988 with the thesis Holt og Holtar. Om utviklingen av det indoeuropeiske kollektivum i norrønt på sammenlignende grunnlag.

His fields of specialty are general comparative language history, general Indo-Germanic linguistics, all archaic Germanic languages (Old West Norse, Gothic, Old High German etc.), and Germanic linguistics in general, including runes, morphology, and etymology.

His most famous work is a new etymological dictionary (Våre Arveord "Our inherited words") for Norwegian, which is a collaboration with Fredrik Otto Lindeman, another linguistics professor in the Indo-Germanic field. It came out in 2000, with a second edition in 2007 and a significantly revised third edition in 2019.
