= Sandøy Municipality =

Former municipality in Møre og Romsdal, Norway

Sandøy Municipality Sandøy kommune
- Former municipality
- Sandø herred (historic name)
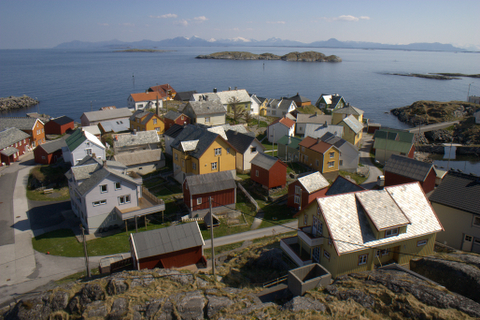
- View of the village of Ona

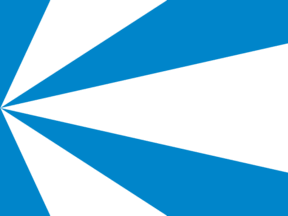
- Flag Coat of arms

- Møre og Romsdal within Norway

- Sandøy within Møre og Romsdal
- Coordinates: 62°45′40″N 06°27′5″E
- Country: Norway
- County: Møre og Romsdal
- District: Romsdal
- Established: 1 Jan 1867
  - Preceded by: Akerø Municipality
- Disestablished: 1 Jan 2020
  - Succeeded by: Ålesund Municipality and Aukra Municipality
- Administrative centre: Steinshamn

Government
  - Mayor (2015-2019): Oddvar Myklebust (Ap)

Area (upon dissolution)
  - Total: 21.43 km^{2} (8.27 sq mi)
  - Land: 21.36 km^{2} (8.25 sq mi)
  - Water: 0.07 km^{2} (0.027 sq mi) 0.3%
  - Rank: #416 in Norway
- Highest elevation: 156.2 m (512 ft)

Population (2019)
  - Total: 1,238
  - Rank: #373 in Norway
  - Density: 57.8/km^{2} (150/sq mi)
  - Change (10 years): ▼ −5.3%
- Demonym: Sandøying

Official language
  - Norwegian form: Nynorsk
- Time zone: UTC+01:00 (CET)
  - Summer (DST): UTC+02:00 (CEST)
- ISO 3166 code: NO-1546

Sandøy is a former municipality in Møre og Romsdal county, Norway. The 21-square-kilometre (8.1 sq mi) municipality existed from 1867 until its dissolution in 2020. The area is now divided between Aukra Municipality and Ålesund Municipality on the border of the traditional districts of Romsdal and Sunnmøre. The administrative centre was the village of Steinshamn. Other villages included Ona and Myklebust.

Prior to its dissolution in 2020, the 21.43-square-kilometre (8.27 sq mi) municipality was the 416th largest by area out of the 422 municipalities in Norway. Sandøy Municipality was the 373rd most populous municipality in Norway with a population of about 1,238. The municipality's population density was 57.8 inhabitants per square kilometre (150/sq mi) and its population had decreased by 5.3% over the previous 10-year period.

The municipality was spread out over many islands in the mouth of the vast Romsdal Fjord. The Flatflesa Lighthouse and Ona Lighthouse protect the boats traveling around the municipality. The Nordøy Fixed Link project was constructed from 2018 until 2023 and it included three undersea tunnels and several bridges that connected the main islands of Sandøy Municipality and the islands of Haram Municipality to the mainland.

== General information ==
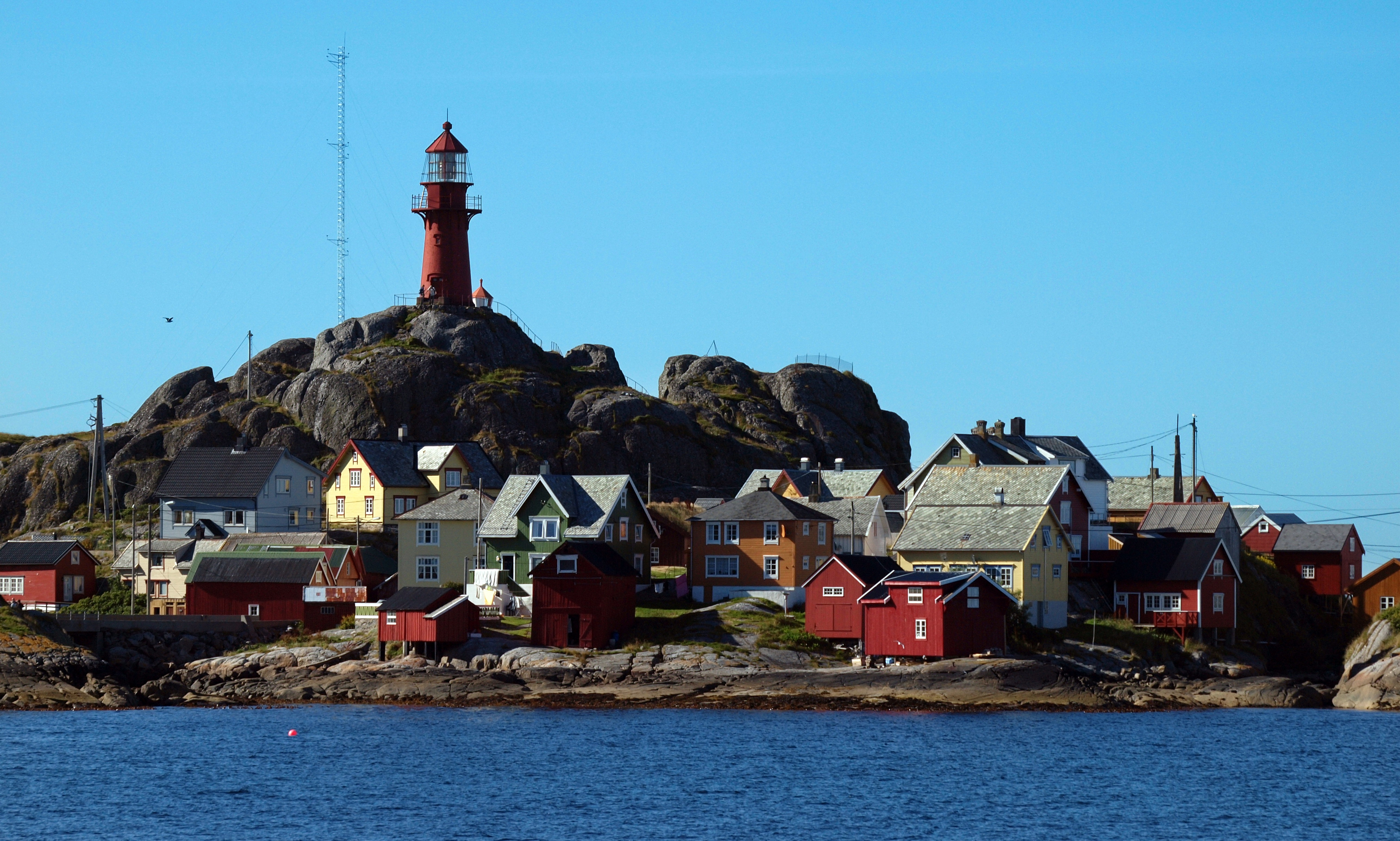
View of the island of Ona

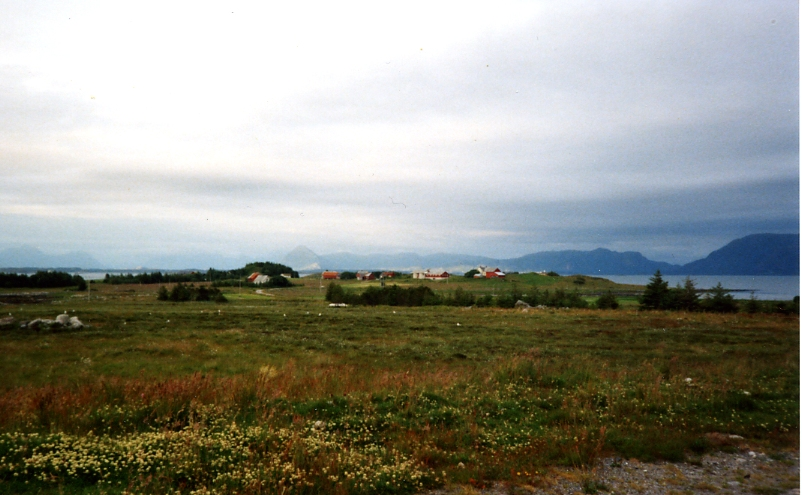
View of the island of Orta

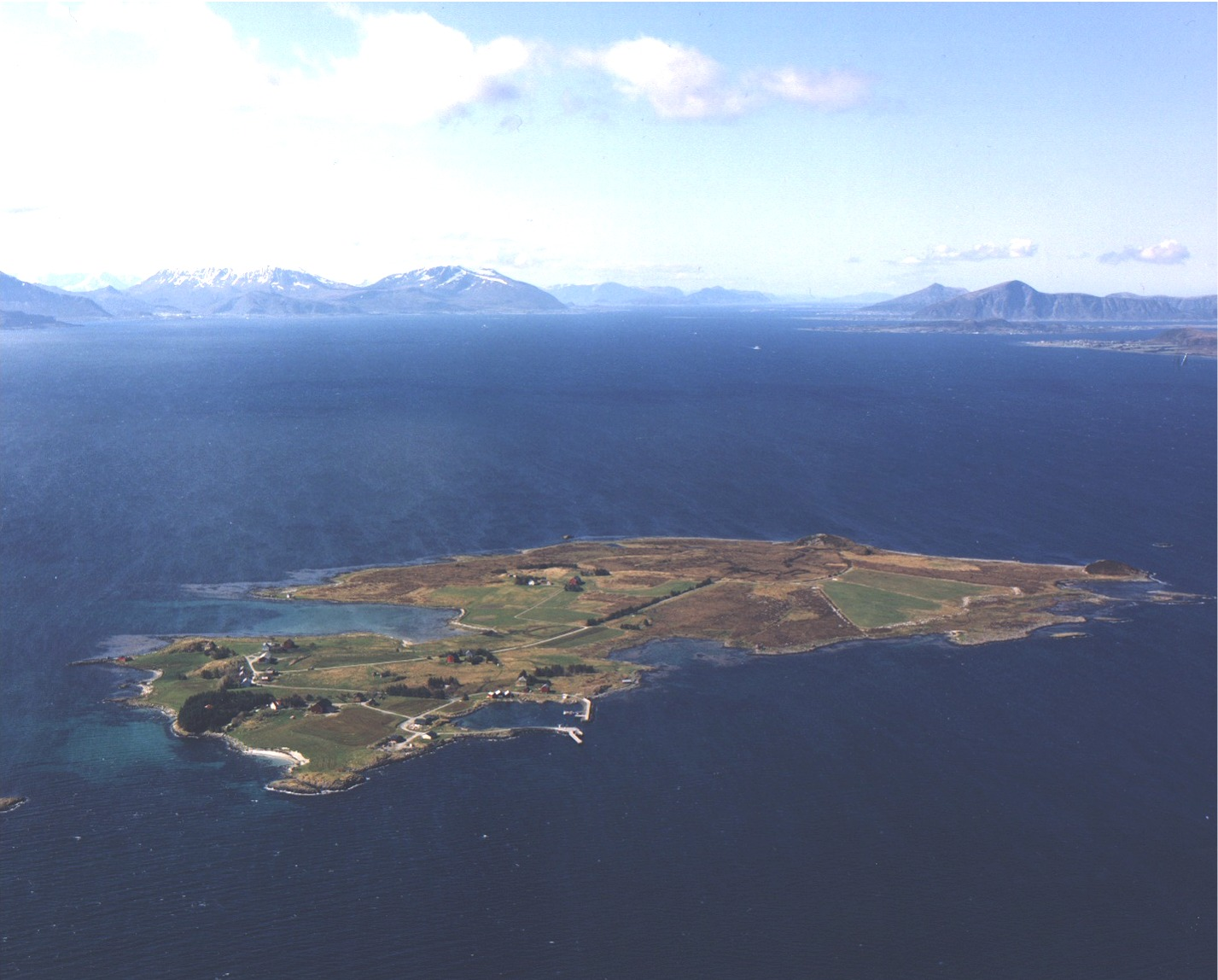
View of the island of Orta

The new Sandø Municipality was established on 1 January 1867 when the Akerø Municipality was divided into two: the western islands (population: 601) became the new Sandø Municipality and the eastern islands (population: 2,026). The spelling of the name was later changed to Sandøy Municipality.

During the 1960s, there were many municipal mergers across Norway due to the work of the Schei Committee. On 1 January 1965, the Myklebust area on Harøya island and some smaller surrounding islands to the west (population: 287) were transferred from Haram Municipality to Sandøy Municipality.

On 1 January 2020, Sandøy Municipality was dissolved. The islands of Orta and Lyngværet (and the small surrounding islands) were merged into Aukra Municipality. The remainder of the old Sandøy Municipality was merged with Haram Municipality, Ørskog Municipality, Skodje Municipality, and Ålesund Municipality to form one large municipality of Ålesund.

=== Name ===
The municipality (originally the parish) is named after the farm and small island of Sandøya (Old Norse: Sandøy) since the first Sandøy Church was built there. The first element comes from the word sandr which means "sand". The last element is øy which means "island". Historically, the name of the municipality was spelled Sandøen or Sandø. The municipality was also known as Sandø i Romsdal to distinguish it from the nearby Sandø Municipality in Sunnmøre which was known as Sandø i Sunnmøre. On 3 November 1917, a royal resolution changed the spelling of the name of the municipality to Sandøy.

=== Coat of arms ===
The coat of arms was granted on 12 December 1986 and they were in use until the municipality was dissolved on 1 January 2020. The official blazon is "Azure, three piles conjoined in dexter argent" (Norwegian: I blått tre sølv spissar som møtest i høgre skjoldrand). This means the arms have a blue field (background) and the charge is a three triangles conjoined at a point along the left side. The charge has a tincture of argent which means it is commonly colored white, but if it is made out of metal, then silver is used. The design is meant to mimic the light beams from the Ona Lighthouse. This was chosen since lighthouses play an important role in the safety in the municipality, which consists of 871 islands and skerries. The arms were designed by Astor Furseth. The municipal flag has the same design as the coat of arms.

=== Churches ===
The Church of Norway had one parish (sokn) within Sandøy Municipality. It was part of the Molde domprosti (arch-deanery) in the Diocese of Møre.

Churches in Sandøy Municipality
Parish (sokn)	Church name	Location of the church	Year built
Sandøy	Sandøy Church	Sandøya	1812
Sandøy	Harøy Church	Harøya	1934

== Geography ==
Sandøy was an island municipality. Sandøy consisted of 871 islands, but only five were regularly inhabited by the time the municipality was dissolved. The main inhabited islands were Harøya, Sandøya, Finnøya, Ona, and Orta. Ona is the most famous of the islands and is a popular tourist destination due to its history and the Ona Lighthouse. The highest point in the municipality was the 156.2-metre (512 ft) tall mountain Harøyburet on the island of Harøya.

== Government ==
Sandøy Municipality was responsible for primary education (through 10th grade), outpatient health services, senior citizen services, welfare and other social services, zoning, economic development, and municipal roads and utilities. The municipality was governed by a municipal council of directly elected representatives. The mayor was indirectly elected by a vote of the municipal council. The municipality was under the jurisdiction of the Romsdal District Court and the Frostating Court of Appeal.

=== Municipal council ===
The municipal council (Kommunestyre) of Sandøy Municipality is made up of 19 representatives that are elected to four year terms. The tables below show the historical composition of the council by political party.

Sandøy kommunestyre 2015–2019
Party name (in Nynorsk)	Number of representatives
Labour Party (Arbeidarpartiet)	10
Conservative Party (Høgre)	6
Liberal Party (Venstre)	3
Total number of members:	19
Note: On 1 January 2020, Sandøy Municipality was divided between of Aukra Municipality and Ålesund Municipality.

Sandøy kommunestyre 2011–2015
Party name (in Nynorsk)	Number of representatives
Labour Party (Arbeidarpartiet)	6
Progress Party (Framstegspartiet)	1
Conservative Party (Høgre)	7
Liberal Party (Venstre)	5
Total number of members:	19

Sandøy kommunestyre 2007–2011
Party name (in Nynorsk)	Number of representatives
Labour Party (Arbeidarpartiet)	6
Progress Party (Framstegspartiet)	1
Conservative Party (Høgre)	6
Christian Democratic Party (Kristeleg Folkeparti)	2
Liberal Party (Venstre)	4
Total number of members:	19

Sandøy kommunestyre 2003–2007
Party name (in Nynorsk)	Number of representatives
Labour Party (Arbeidarpartiet)	3
Conservative Party (Høgre)	10
Christian Democratic Party (Kristeleg Folkeparti)	2
Liberal Party (Venstre)	2
Cross-party list for Sandøy (Tverrpolitisk liste for Sandøy)	2
Total number of members:	19

Sandøy kommunestyre 1999–2003
Party name (in Nynorsk)	Number of representatives
Labour Party (Arbeidarpartiet)	3
Conservative Party (Høgre)	6
Christian Democratic Party (Kristeleg Folkeparti)	4
Liberal Party (Venstre)	2
Cross-party list (Tverrpolitisk liste)	4
Total number of members:	19

Sandøy kommunestyre 1995–1999
Party name (in Nynorsk)	Number of representatives
Labour Party (Arbeidarpartiet)	7
Conservative Party (Høgre)	5
Christian Democratic Party (Kristeleg Folkeparti)	4
Centre Party (Senterpartiet)	2
Liberal Party (Venstre)	1
Total number of members:	19

Sandøy kommunestyre 1991–1995
Party name (in Nynorsk)	Number of representatives
Labour Party (Arbeidarpartiet)	5
Conservative Party (Høgre)	5
Christian Democratic Party (Kristeleg Folkeparti)	4
Centre Party (Senterpartiet)	2
Liberal Party (Venstre)	3
Total number of members:	19

Sandøy kommunestyre 1987–1991
Party name (in Nynorsk)	Number of representatives
Labour Party (Arbeidarpartiet)	4
Conservative Party (Høgre)	5
Christian Democratic Party (Kristeleg Folkeparti)	3
Centre Party (Senterpartiet)	2
Joint list of the Liberal Party (Venstre) and Liberal People's Party (Liberale Folkepartiet)	5
Total number of members:	19

Sandøy kommunestyre 1983–1987
Party name (in Nynorsk)	Number of representatives
Labour Party (Arbeidarpartiet)	3
Conservative Party (Høgre)	3
Christian Democratic Party (Kristeleg Folkeparti)	4
Liberal People's Party (Liberale Folkepartiet)	1
Centre Party (Senterpartiet)	4
Liberal Party (Venstre)	1
Non-party election list (Upolitisk valliste)	3
Total number of members:	19

Sandøy kommunestyre 1979–1983
Party name (in Nynorsk)	Number of representatives
Labour Party (Arbeidarpartiet)	3
Conservative Party (Høgre)	4
Christian Democratic Party (Kristeleg Folkeparti)	4
Centre Party (Senterpartiet)	3
Joint list of the Liberal Party (Venstre) and New People's Party (Nye Folkepartiet)	2
Non-party election list (Upolitisk valliste)	3
Total number of members:	19

Sandøy kommunestyre 1975–1979
Party name (in Nynorsk)	Number of representatives
Labour Party (Arbeidarpartiet)	3
Conservative Party (Høgre)	1
Christian Democratic Party (Kristeleg Folkeparti)	5
New People's Party (Nye Folkepartiet)	1
Centre Party (Senterpartiet)	5
Non-party election list (Upolitisk Valliste)	4
Total number of members:	19

Sandøy kommunestyre 1971–1975
Party name (in Nynorsk)	Number of representatives
Labour Party (Arbeidarpartiet)	4
Christian Democratic Party (Kristeleg Folkeparti)	4
Centre Party (Senterpartiet)	6
Liberal Party (Venstre)	2
Local List(s) (Lokale lister)	3
Total number of members:	19

Sandøy kommunestyre 1967–1971
Party name (in Nynorsk)	Number of representatives
Christian Democratic Party (Kristeleg Folkeparti)	4
Liberal Party (Venstre)	1
Local List(s) (Lokale lister)	14
Total number of members:	19

Sandøy kommunestyre 1963–1967
Party name (in Nynorsk)	Number of representatives
Local List(s) (Lokale lister)	17
Total number of members:	17

Sandøy heradsstyre 1959–1963
Party name (in Nynorsk)	Number of representatives
Local List(s) (Lokale lister)	17
Total number of members:	17

Sandøy heradsstyre 1955–1959
Party name (in Nynorsk)	Number of representatives
Local List(s) (Lokale lister)	17
Total number of members:	17

Sandøy heradsstyre 1951–1955
Party name (in Nynorsk)	Number of representatives
Local List(s) (Lokale lister)	16
Total number of members:	16

Sandøy heradsstyre 1947–1951
Party name (in Nynorsk)	Number of representatives
Local List(s) (Lokale lister)	16
Total number of members:	16

Sandøy heradsstyre 1945–1947
Party name (in Nynorsk)	Number of representatives
Labour Party (Arbeidarpartiet)	2
Local List(s) (Lokale lister)	14
Total number of members:	16

Sandøy heradsstyre 1937–1941*
Party name (in Nynorsk)	Number of representatives
Labour Party (Arbeidarpartiet)	3
Local List(s) (Lokale lister)	13
Total number of members:	16
Note: Due to the German occupation of Norway during World War II, no elections were held for new municipal councils until after the war ended in 1945.

=== Mayors ===
The mayor (Nynorsk: ordførar) of Sandøy Municipality was the political leader of the municipality and the chairperson of the municipal council. The following people have held this position:

- 1867–1871: Paul Knudsen Gaasø
- 1871–1872: Lars Olsson Sandøy
- 1872–1876: Rasmus Pedersson Huse
- 1876–1877: Gunnar Olsson Sandøy
- 1877–1879: Jonas Knutsson Sandøy
- 1880–1885: Thor Elias Pedersson Huse
- 1886–1887: Knut Paulsson Gåsøy
- 1888–1891: Thor Elias Pedersson Huse
- 1892–1901: Knut Nilsson Finnøy
- 1901–1904: Bernt E. Brunvoll
- 1904–1910: Peder P. Orten
- 1910–1922: Paul I. Huse
- 1922–1925: Elias E. Marøy (V)
- 1925–1928: Peder P. Orten
- 1928–1934: Paul J. Sandøy
- 1934–1941: Elias E. Marøy (V)
- 1941–1943: Nils N. Finnøy
- 1943–1944: Ole P. Husøy
- 1945–1945: Elias E. Marøy (V)
- 1946–1955: Nils K. Finnøy
- 1956–1964: Olav Skotheim (LL)
- 1965–1975: Johan P. Sandøy (LL/Sp)
- 1976–1979: Tor Huse (LL)
- 1980–1987: Idar Grøtta (Sp)
- 1988–1991: Paul Edmund Steinshamn (DLF/V)
- 1991–1995: Runar Myklebust (H)
- 1995–1999: Oddvar Myklebust (Ap)
- 1999–2007: Nils Magne Abelseth (H)
- 2007–2011: Oddvar Myklebust (Ap)
- 2011–2015: Hans Endre Sæterøy (H)
- 2015–2019: Oddvar Myklebust (Ap)

== See also ==
- List of former municipalities of Norway
