= Ledesma =

Ledesma may refer to:

== People ==
=== Arts ===
- Alan Ledesma (actor) (1977–2008), Mexican actor
- Blas de Ledesma (17th century), Spanish painter
- Clara Ledesma (1924–1999), Dominican painter
- Inda Ledesma (1926–2010), Argentine actress and theater director
- Ish Ledesma (born 1952), Cuban-American musician
- José de Ledesma (1630–1670), Spanish painter
- Kuh Ledesma (born 1955), Filipino jazz vocalist
- Roberto Ledesma (poet) (1901–1966), Argentinian poet
- Roberto Ledesma (singer) (born 1924), Cuban singer

=== Public affairs ===
- Antonio Ledesma (born 1943), Archbishop of Cagayan de Oro, Philippines
- Antonio Ledesma Jayme (1854–1937), Filipino lawmaker
- Fernando Ledesma (politician) (born 1939), Spanish politician
- Jesús Ledesma Aguilar (1963–2006), Mexican national executed in Texas
- Jules Ledesma (born 1960), Filipino businessman and politician
- Ramiro Ledesma Ramos (1905–1936), Spanish politician

=== Sports ===
- Aaron Ledesma (born 1971), American professional baseball player
- Alan Ledesma (footballer) (born 1998), Argentine footballer
- Ángel Ledesma (born 1993), Ecuadorian football player
- Arturo Ledesma (born 1988), Mexican football player
- Carlos Ledesma (born 1964), Argentine football player
- Conan Ledesma (born 1993), Argentine football player
- Christian Ledesma (born 1976), Argentine racing driver
- Cristian Daniel Ledesma (born 1982), Argentine professional football player
- Cristian Raúl Ledesma (born 1978), Argentine professional football player
- Cristian Rolando Ledesma (born 1987), Paraguayan professional football player
- Damián Ledesma (born 1982), Argentine football player
- Emmanuel Ledesma (born 1988), Argentine professional football player
- Ernesto Ledesma (1931–2011), Uruguayan football player
- Fernando Ledesma (footballer) (born 1992), Argentine footballer
- Jorge Ledesma (1932–2001), Argentine golfer
- Mario Ledesma (born 1973), Argentine rugby union football player
- Pablo Ledesma (born 1984), Argentine professional football player

== Places ==
- Clodomiro Ledesma, Entre Ríos, Argentina
- Doñinos de Ledesma, Salamanca, Spain
- La Mata de Ledesma, Salamanca, Spain
- Ledesma, Salamanca, Spain
- Libertador General San Martín, Jujuy, Argentina (founded and still colloquially known as "Ledesma")

== Other uses ==
- Club Martín Ledesma, football club in Paraguay
- Ledesma S.A.A.I., Argentine agribusiness firm

== See also ==
- Ledezma, a similar surname
