= Sando =

Sando may refer to:

== Places ==
- Sando, Salamanca, a municipality in Spain
- Sandø (disambiguation), several municipalities in Norway
- Sandö Bridge, northern Sweden
- San Fernando, Trinidad and Tobago, also known as Sando
- Sandō Station, a railway station in Wakayama, Japan

== People ==
- Sando (surname)
- Sando (official) (1876–1941), Qing dynasty and Republic of China official who was the last Qing viceroy of Mongolia

== Other uses ==
- Sandō, the road leading to a Shinto shrine
- Sando (TV series), a 2018 Australian comedy television series
- Sando, a term for sandwich, specifically a style of sandwich popular in Japan
- Sando, the Japanese name of Sandshrew, a fictional species of Pokémon
- Sando, a Filipino term for a sleeveless undershirt

== See also ==
- Sandow (disambiguation)
- Santa María de Sando, a municipality in Spain
- Yardu Sando, a village in Sierra Leone
