= Sandøya =

Sandøya or Sandøy (English: the sand island) may refer to:

== People ==
- Brandur Sandoy (born 1973), a Faroese politician, sheep farmer and businessman
- Paul Joakim Sandøy (born 1987), a Norwegian politician for the Conservative Party

== Places ==
- Sandøya, Agder, an island in Tvedestrand Municipality in Agder county, Norway
- Sandøya, Møre og Romsdal, an island in Ålesund Municipality in Møre og Romsdal county, Norway
- Sandøya, Telemark, an island in Porsgrunn Municipality in Telemark county, Norway
- Sandøya, Troms, an island in Tromsø Municipality in Troms county, Norway
- Sandøy Church, a parish church in Ålesund Municipality in Møre og Romsdal county, Norway

== See also ==
- Sandoy
- Sandø (disambiguation)
- Sandøy Municipality
