= Harøya Wetlands System =

Protected areas in Norway

- Harøya våtmarkssystem
- Location within Møre og Romsdal Location within Norway
- Nearest city: Steinshamn
- Coordinates: 62°45′22″N 6°27′45″E
- Area: 195.6 ha (483 acres)
- Established: 1988

Ramsar Wetland
- Designated: 18 March 1996
- Reference no.: 806

The Harøya Wetlands System (Norwegian: Harøya våtmarkssystem) is a Ramsar site located on Harøya island in Ålesund Municipality in Møre og Romsdal county, Norway. It consists of six separate protected areas: three nature reserves plus a large wildlife sanctuary containing two smaller bird sanctuaries.

The areas have been protected as a Ramsar site since 1996 because of their importance for migratory birds. Harøya has large shallow areas with mudflats where seaweed collects. In the inner parts of the island there are marshy areas, and along the beaches there are damp beach meadows. The island is important as an overwintering area and resting area for birds migrating in the spring and fall.

The protected areas are:

- The Selvikvågen Nature Reserve, established on May 27, 1988 (47.1 hectares or 116 acres)
- The Lomstjønna Nature Reserve, established on May 27, 1988 (11.0 hectares or 27 acres)
- The Malesanden and Huse Wildlife Sanctuary, established on May 27, 1988, a 15.2-square-kilometer (5.9 sq mi) buffer zone with two subareas covering 71.8 hectares (177 acres):
  - The Malesanden Bird Sanctuary
  - The Huse Bird Sanctuary
- The Lyngholman Nature Reserve, established on May 27, 1988 (65.8 hectares or 163 acres)
