= Breve diccionario etimológico de la lengua castellana =

Brief etymological dictionary of the Spanish language

- Author: Joan Corominas
- Language: Spain
- Subject: Spanish-language etymology
- Genre: Philology
- Publisher: Editorial Gredos
- Publication date: 1993
- Media type: Hardcover
- Pages: 627
- ISBN: 9788424913328
- Preceded by: Diccionario crítico etimológico de la lengua castellana
- Followed by: Diccionario crítico etimológico castellano e hispánico

Breve diccionario etimológico de la lengua castellana (in English, Brief etymological dictionary of the Spanish language) is an etymological dictionary compiled by the Catalan philologist Joan Corominas (1905–1997), and first published in 1961—with revised editions in 1967, 1973, 1993, and 2008—by Editorial Gredos in Madrid.

This work has received high marks from critics in the field of Romance philology, and its author has been recognized with the highest honors of Spanish civil society, such as the Premio Nacional de las Letras Españolas, in 1989, which was for the entirety of his work, including both Spanish and Catalan dictionaries.

== Context ==
The dictionary is an abridged version, updated with additional entries, of the Diccionario crítico etimológico de la lengua castellana, and is intended for the non-specialist. It gives the origins of Spanish vocabulary, with frequent references to the rest of the languages of the Iberian Peninsula, as well as to Latin.

== See also ==
- Diccionario crítico etimológico castellano e hispánico – Etymological dictionary of the Spanish language
- Diccionari Etimològic i Complementari de la Llengua Catalana – Etymological and Complementary Dictionary of the Catalan Language

== Bibliography ==
- Corominas, Joan (1993). Breve diccionario etimologico de la lengua castellana. Madrid: Editorial Gredos. ISBN 9788424913328.
- Haensch, Günther; Omeñaca, Carlos (2004), Los diccionarios del español en el siglo XXI (2nd ed.), Salamanca: Ediciones Universidad de Salamanca, ISBN 84-7800-611-7
