= Malesanden and Huse Wildlife Sanctuary =

Protected area in Norway

- Malesanden og Huse dyrefredningsområde
- IUCN category IV (habitat/species management area)
- Location within Møre og Romsdal Location within Norway
- Nearest city: Steinshamn
- Coordinates: 62°45′31″N 6°28′51″E
- Area: 1,520 ha (5.9 sq mi)
- Established: 1988

Ramsar Wetland
- Designated: 18 March 1996
- Part of: Harøya Wetlands System
- Reference no.: 806

The Malesanden and Huse Wildlife Sanctuary (Norwegian: Malesanden og Huse dyrefredningsområde) is located on the east side of Harøya island in Ålesund Municipality in Møre og Romsdal county, Norway.

The area received protection in 1988 "to preserve an important wetland area with its habitat, bird life and other wildlife", according to the conservation regulations. The area consists of a low, wide sandy beach that is a nesting, resting, and overwintering site for various birds: waders, the common shelduck, and the greylag goose. Waterfowl and seabirds overwinter to such an extent that it is considered to have national or even international importance. The dunes also have botanical interest, especially the dune heath, which is one of three intact ones in the county.

The Malesanden and Huse Wildlife Sanctuary is a 15.2-square-kilometer (5.9 sq mi) buffer zone with two subareas covering 71.8 hectares (177 acres): the Malesanden Bird Sanctuary (Norwegian: Malesanden fuglefredingsområde) and the Huse Bird Sanctuary (Norwegian: Huse fuglefredingsområde).

The wildlife sanctuary is one of six natural areas that were included in the Harøya Wetlands System Ramsar site, which was established in 1996.
