= Selvikvågen Nature Reserve =

Protected area in Norway

- Selvikvågen naturreservat
- IUCN category Ia (strict nature reserve)
- Location within Møre og Romsdal Location within Norway
- Nearest city: Steinshamn
- Coordinates: 62°46′39″N 6°26′26″E
- Area: 47.1 ha (116 acres)
- Established: 1988

Ramsar Wetland
- Designated: 18 March 1996
- Part of: Harøya Wetlands System
- Reference no.: 806

The Selvikvågen Nature Reserve (Norwegian: Selvikvågen naturreservat) is located on Harøya island in Ålesund Municipality in Møre og Romsdal county, Norway.

The area received protection in 1988 "to preserve an important wetland area with associated plant communities, bird life and other wildlife", according to the conservation regulations. Selvikvågen ('Selvik Bay') is a shallow bay with conservation-worthy beach meadows and narrow coves in the inner part, and with mudflats and large tidal areas; it is shielded from the sea by islets. The site is a grazing and nesting area for ducks and waders, and is also botanically rich, with 87 identified plant species, including curved sedge (Carex maritima), yellow flag (Iris pseudacorus), and water ragwort (Jacobaea aquatica).

The reserve is one of six natural areas that were included in the Harøya Wetlands System Ramsar site, which was established in 1996.
