= Lyngholman Nature Reserve =

Protected area in Norway

- Lyngholman naturreservat
- IUCN category Ia (strict nature reserve)
- Location within Møre og Romsdal Location within Norway
- Nearest city: Steinshamn
- Coordinates: 62°48′00″N 6°29′25″E
- Area: 65.8 ha (163 acres)
- Established: 1988

Ramsar Wetland
- Designated: 18 March 1996
- Part of: Harøya Wetlands System
- Reference no.: 806

The Lyngholman Nature Reserve (Norwegian: Lyngholman naturreservat) is located on Finnøya island in Ålesund Municipality in Møre og Romsdal county, Norway.

The area received protection in 1988 "to preserve an important wetland area with associated plant communities, bird life and other wildlife", according to the conservation regulations. The bay that the site encompasses has many beach meadows, shallow coves, small islands and large tidal areas. The landscape is undisturbed, and it is hilly with heather fields, marshes, and pastures around the beach meadows. The bay is a nesting ground for waders, and a grazing and overwintering site for other wetland species. It is also a botanical area meriting protection. The area is easily accessible for teaching and research, and there is much outdoor space and a swimming area for summer use.

The reserve is one of six natural areas that were included in the Harøya Wetlands System Ramsar site, which was established in 1996.
