= Orta, Møre og Romsdal =

Island in Møre og Romsdal, Norway

Orta
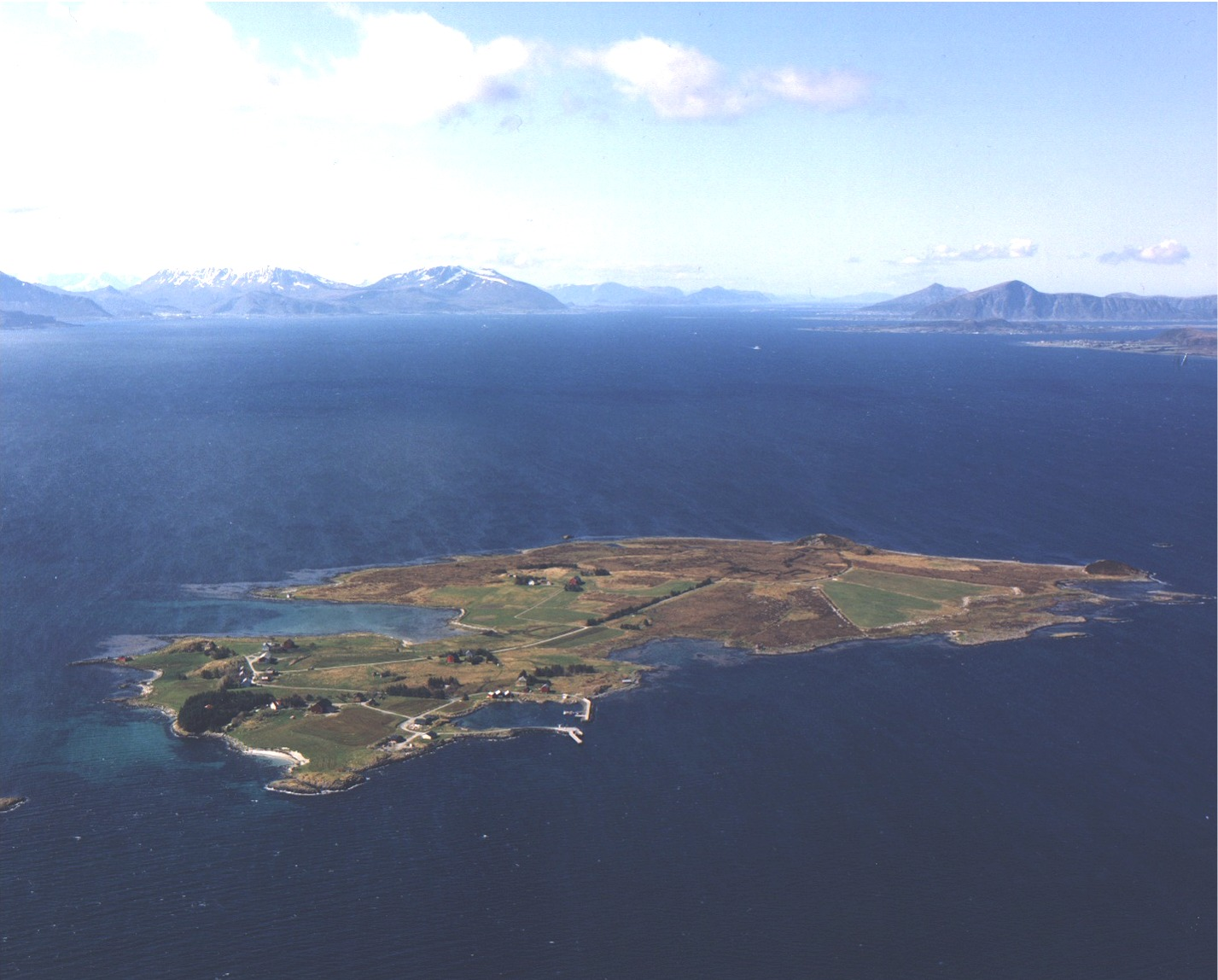
- View of the island
- Interactive map of Orta

Geography
- Location: Møre og Romsdal, Norway
- Coordinates: 62.7814°N 6.6387°E
- Area: 1 km^{2} (0.39 sq mi)
- Length: 1.5 km (0.93 mi)
- Width: 1 km (0.6 mi)
- Coastline: 5.5 km (3.42 mi)
- Highest elevation: 28 m (92 ft)
- Highest point: Rambjøra

Administration
- Norway
- County: Møre og Romsdal
- Municipality: Aukra Municipality

Orta is an island in Aukra Municipality in Møre og Romsdal county, Norway. The 1-square-kilometre (250-acre) island lies midway between the islands of Harøya and Gossa in the Harøyfjorden. There are ferry connections from Orta to Sandøya and Finnøya (in Ålesund Municipality) and to Gossa (in Aukra Municipality).

== History ==
On 1 January 2020, the island of Orta and the small surrounding islets were administratively transferred to the neighboring Aukra Municipality. Prior to that time, they were part of the old Sandøy Municipality.

== See also ==
- List of islands of Norway
