= Elias E. Marøy =

Norwegian politician

Elias Albert Eliasson Marøy (18 July 1885 – 2 August 1976) was a Norwegian fishers' leader and politician for the Liberal Party.

He hailed the island of Harøya in Sandøy Municipality, Norway. Starting his career as a fisherman at the age of 15, he was a co-founder of Storsildlaget in 1927 and active in Norges Fiskarlag. He was a co-founder of the local savings bank, was active in Statens Fiskarbank and received the King's Medal of Merit.

He served as mayor of Sandøy Municipality in 1923, 1924 and 1925, and then from 1935 to 1941. In between he served as deputy mayor in 1926, 1927, 1928, 1932, 1933 and 1934. In 1941 during the occupation of Norway by Nazi Germany local government was suspended. Marøy was appointed by Nasjonal Samling to continue as mayor, but withdrew after learning about the collaborationist nature of the new mayoral position. After the war's end he was reinstated as mayor from 8 May to 31 December 1945. He was third deputy representative to the Parliament of Norway from Møre og Romsdal during the terms 1934–1936 and 1945–1949, although he was not called to step in.

Marøy was also a prolific amateur poet.
