= La Llama =

La Llama (Spanish "the flame") may refer to:

== Literature ==
- La Llama, autobiographical account of the Spanish Civil War by Arturo Barea 1986.
- La Llama, collection of poems by Roberto Ledesma (poet) 1955.
- "La Llama", a poem by Borges
- La llama, by es:Fermín Estrella Gutiérrez 1941

== Music ==
- La Llama (opera) José María Usandizaga 1915
- La Llama, album by Savath & Savalas 2009
- "La Llama", song by Los Palominos Composed by Manny Benito
- "La Llama", song by Macaco (band) Composed by Dani Macaco
