= José Antonio Pascual =

Spanish linguist

The Most Excellent José Antonio Pascual
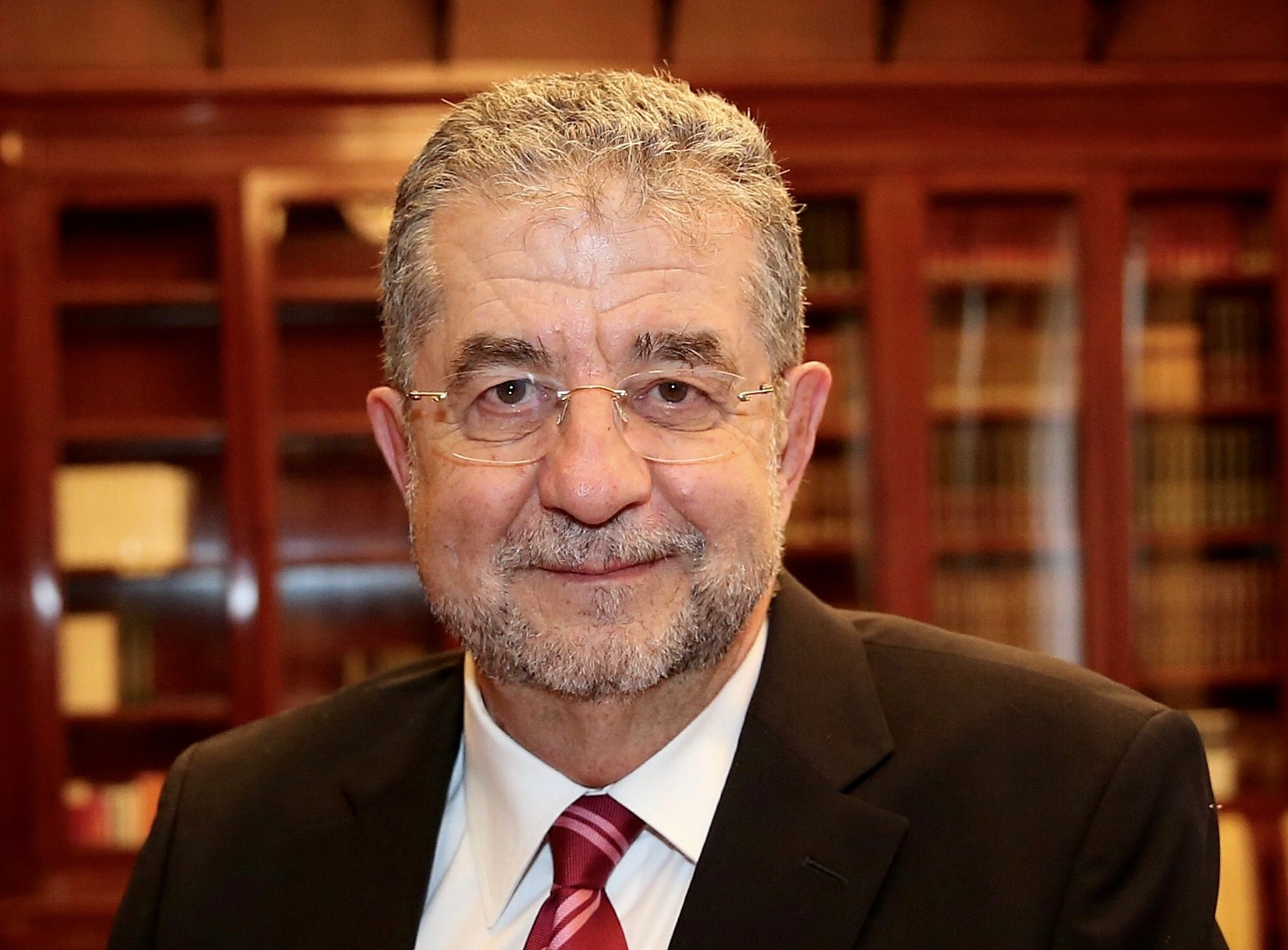
- Born: 29 March 1942 (age 84); Monleras (Salamanca), Spain
- Education: Universidad de Salamanca
- Occupations: professor, linguist
- Notable work: Diccionario crítico etimológico castellano e hispánico, Hablando claro
- Title: Professor at Charles III University of Madrid, Accademia della Crusca, Institut d'Estudis Catalans
- Awards: Caballero de las Artes y las Letras, Premio Nacional de Investigación Ramón Menéndez Pidal (2006)

Seat k of the Real Academia Española
- Incumbent
- Assumed office 10 March 2002 (Note: Elected on 28 June 2001)
- Preceded by: Rafael Lapesa

José Antonio Pascual Rodríguez (born 29 March 1942, Monleras, Salamanca) is a linguist and professor of the Spanish language at Charles III University of Madrid, and a member of the Royal Spanish Academy and Accademia della Crusca, the regulatory institutions of standard Spanish and Italian, respectively. He joined the Royal Spanish Academy in 2002, serving as its vice president from 2007 to 2015, and is best known for his work with Joan Coromines on the Diccionario crítico etimológico castellano e hispánico (published 1983-1991), as well as the television series Hablando claro aired in Spain in the late 1980s.
