= Diccionari etimològic i complementari de la llengua catalana =

Etymological and Complementary Dictionary of the Catalan Language

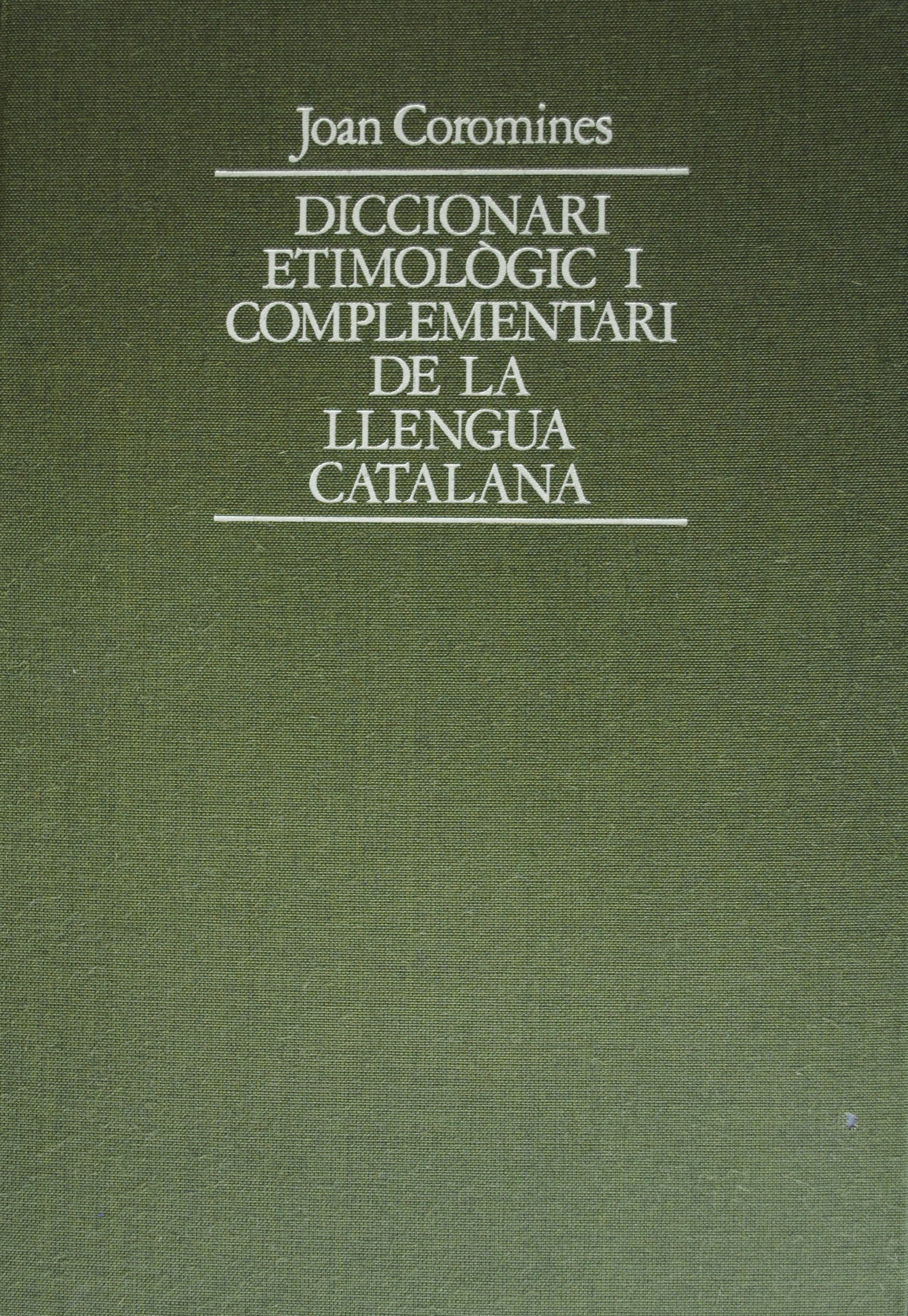
Cover of a volume of the dictionary.

The Diccionari etimològic i complementari de la llengua catalana (or DECat , "Etymological and Complementary Dictionary of the Catalan Language") is an etymological dictionary of Catalan compiled by Joan Coromines with cooperation of Joseph Gulsoy and Max Cahner.

It was published by Curial Edicions Catalanes and consists of nine volumes, published between 1980 and 1991; a tenth volume (2001) contains a "suplement" and indexes. It was designed with the same criteria and methodology as the other major dictionaries by the same author: the Diccionario crítico etimológico de la lengua castellana (1954-1957) and the Diccionario crítico etimológico castellano e hispánico (1980-1991).
