= Zarapicos =

- Municipality
- Flag Coat of arms

- Location in Salamanca

- Location in Spain
- Coordinates: 41°03′35″N 5°49′52″W
- Country: Spain
- Autonomous community: Castile and León
- Province: Salamanca
- Comarca: Tierra de Ledesma

Government
  - Mayor: Melquiades Pérez Sánchez (PSOE)

Area
  - Total: 7.65 km^{2} (2.95 sq mi)
- Elevation: 784 m (2,572 ft)

Population (2025-01-01)
  - Total: 50
  - Density: 6.5/km^{2} (17/sq mi)
- Time zone: UTC+1 (CET)
  - Summer (DST): UTC+2 (CEST)
- Postal code: 37170

Zarapicos (meaning Fox bites in English) is a municipality in the province of Salamanca, western Spain, part of the autonomous community of Castile-Leon. It is located 20 kilometers from the city of Salamanca and as of 2016 had a population only 55 people. The municipality covers an area of 8 km².

The village lies 784 meters above sea level and the postal code is 37170.
