= Ledezma =

Ledezma is a Spanish-language surname. People with the surname include:

== People ==
- Antonio Ledezma (born 1955), Venezuelan lawyer, politician and former political prisoner
- Froylán Ledezma (born 1978), Costa Rican football forward
- Iván Ledezma (born 1995), Chilean footballer
- Jorge Ledezma (born 1963), Bolivian lawyer and politician
- Juan Pablo Ledezma (born 1987), Mexican gangleader of La Línea
- Nicolás Ledezma, Mexican paralympic athlete
- Richard Ledezma (born 2000), American soccer player
- Wil Ledezma (born 1981), Venezuelan professional baseball pitcher
- Luis Henríquez Ledezma (born 1981; Luis Henríquez), Panamanian football defender
- Leonel Moreira Ledezma (born 1990; Leonel Moreira), Costa Rican football player
- Álex Rodríguez (Panamanian footballer) (born 1990; Álex Rodríguez Ledezma), Panamanian footballer
- Guadalupe Ledezma Sanchez (born 1961; Lupe Sanchez), American football defensive back
- Francisco Sierra Ledezma (born 1987; Francisco Sierra (boxer)), Mexican boxer
- Luis "El Children" Ledezma, member of the Mexican band Café Tacuba
- Julio "Jimmy" Ledezma, member of the Argentinian band Arco Iris (band)
- Jorge and Angel Ledezma, members of the Mexican-American band Allá

== See also ==
- Ledesma (disambiguation)
- Jacala de Ledezma, town and municipality of Hidalgo, Mexico
