= Joan Coromines =

Spanish linguist (1905–1997)

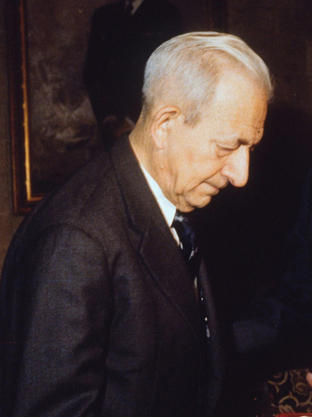
- Born: 21 March 1905; Barcelona, Catalonia, Spain
- Died: 2 January 1997 (aged 91); Pineda de Mar, Catalonia, Spain

Academic background
- Education: University of Barcelona
- Thesis: Vocabulario aranés

Academic work
- Discipline: linguistics
- Main interests: Romance languages
- Notable works: Diccionario crítico etimológico de la lengua castellana

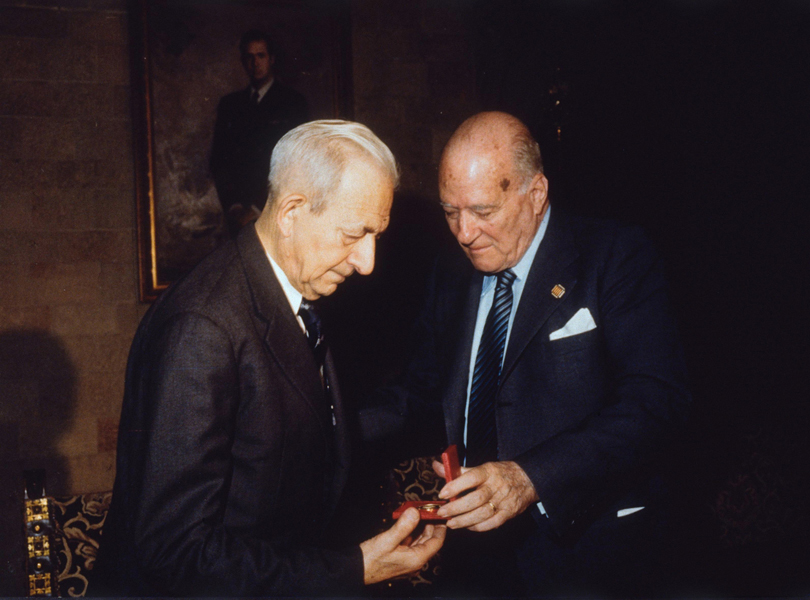
Joan Coromines (on the left) receiving the Gold Medal of the Generalitat of Catalonia from Josep Tarradellas (1980).

Joan Coromines i Vigneaux (Catalan pronunciation: [ʒuˈaŋ kuɾuˈminəs]; also frequently spelled Joan Corominas; Barcelona, Catalonia, Spain 1905 – Pineda de Mar, Catalonia, Spain, 1997) was a linguist who made important contributions to the study of Catalan, Spanish, and other Romance languages.

His main works are the Diccionario crítico etimológico de la lengua castellana (1954–1957), in four volumes, first version of his etymological dictionary of Spanish (with an abridged version, Breve diccionario etimológico de la lengua castellana, first published in 1961); the Diccionari etimològic i complementari de la llengua catalana, which investigates the origin of most words in the Catalan language (9 volumes); the Onomasticon Cataloniae, documenting place and person names, old and new, in all the Catalan-speaking territories (8 volumes); and, with José Antonio Pascual, the Diccionario crítico etimológico castellano e hispánico, the most thorough etymological dictionary of Spanish extant today. Following this research, he—along with Koldo Mitxelena—made key contributions to the study of the Basque language's geographical extent across the Pyrenees during the early Middle Ages.

== Biography ==
Joan Coromines was the son of politician Pere Coromines and pedagogue Celestina Vigneaux, and the brother of mathematician Ernest Corominas and psychoanalyst Júlia Coromines.

From an early age, he showed interest in linguistics. He studied at the Faculty of Philosophy and Letters of the University of Barcelona and completed further studies in several European cities between 1925 and 1929, including Montpellier (where he had to take refuge due to his opposition to the dictatorship of Primo de Rivera), Madrid (where he pursued his doctorate), and Zurich, where he studied with Jakob Jud, who had a strong influence on him. He also attended classes by professors such as Grammont and Millardet in Montpellier, and Américo Castro and Ramón Menéndez Pidal in Madrid.

In 1930 he joined the Institut d'Estudis Catalans, working on Pompeu Fabra’s lexicographic team. The following year he defended his doctoral thesis, Vocabulario aranés, and began preparing the Onomasticon Cataloniae, a monumental etymological compilation of Catalan toponyms based on oral surveys, which he completed near the end of his life.

A declared Catalanist, republican, and opponent of Franco, he went into exile after the Spanish Civil War, living in several countries before obtaining a chair at the University of Chicago in 1946. In Argentina, he founded the Institute of Linguistics at the National University of Cuyo in Mendoza, where he also launched the journal Anales del Instituto de Lingüística. He became an associate member of the Institut d'Estudis Catalans in 1950 and formally joined in 1952, when he returned to Spain temporarily after thirteen years abroad.

After retiring from Chicago in 1967, he settled in Pineda de Mar (Catalonia) and dedicated himself entirely to his lexicographical work. He refused several prizes from the Spanish government, in protest at the treatment of the Catalan language and culture in Spain.

Between 1980 and 1991 he published the Diccionari etimològic i complementari de la llengua catalana. He was awarded the Premi d’Honor de les Lletres Catalanes (1984) and the Spanish National Prize for Literature (1989). Although he accepted the latter, he expressed in a public letter his criticism of the Spanish government’s policies toward the Catalan language. For similar reasons he declined both the Grand Cross of the Civil Order of Alfonso X the Wise and membership in the Royal Spanish Academy.

In October 1994, at the age of 89, he finished the Onomasticon Cataloniae with the assistance of collaborators including Xavier Terrado, Joseph Gulsoy, Philip D. Rasico, and Joan Ferrer. The first volume appeared in 1989, and the eighth and final one was published posthumously.

The Coromines Foundation has been editing his extensive correspondence, which will eventually comprise around 25 volumes. Letters with Pompeu Fabra, Francesc de B. Moll, Josep Pla, Joan Fuster, Carles Riba, Joan Sales, and others have already been published. Another volume, prepared by José Antonio Pascual and José Ignacio Pérez Pascual, contains his correspondence with Ramón Menéndez Pidal between 1939 and 1955.

Coromines was also named an honorary member of the Basque Language Academy in 1994. Today, his name is commemorated by schools and public spaces in Barcelona, Mataró, Benicarló, and Pineda de Mar.

In honor of Coromines, in April 2006 the University of Chicago inaugurated the Càtedra Joan Coromines d'Estudis Catalans, a teaching chair for visiting professors of Catalan language and literature.

== Works ==
- Vocabulario aranés (1931)
- What Should Be Known About the Catalan Language (1951); later translated into Catalan (1954) as El que s’ha de saber de la llengua catalana
- Algunes lleis fonètiques catalanes no observades fins ara (1954)
- Diccionario crítico etimológico de la lengua castellana (1954–1957)
  - Expanded in collaboration with José Antonio Pascual as Diccionario crítico etimológico castellano e hispánico (1984–1991, 6 vols.)
- Breve diccionario etimológico de la lengua castellana (1961; expanded edition 1990)
- Estudis de toponímia catalana (1965–1970)
- Lleures i converses d’un filòleg (1971)
- Tópica hespérica. Estudio sobre los antiguos dialectos, el substrato y la toponimia romances (1972)
- Entre dos llenguatges (1976–1977)
- Diccionari etimològic i complementari de la llengua catalana (1980–2001)
- Onomasticon Cataloniae (1989–1997, 8 vols.)
- El parlar de la Vall d'Aran. Gramàtica, diccionari i estudis lexicals sobre el gascó (1990)

== Bibliography ==
- Corominas, Joan (1961). Breve diccionario etimológico de la lengua castellana (1st ed.). Madrid: Gredos.
- Corominas, Joan (1973). Breve diccionario etimológico de la lengua castellana (3rd ed.). Madrid: Gredos. ISBN 84-249-1331-0.
- Corominas, Joan; Pascual, José A. (1983–1991). Diccionario crítico etimológico castellano e hispánico. Madrid: Gredos. ISBN 84-249-1362-0.
1. Corominas, Joan; Pascual, José A. (1984). Vol. I: A-Ca. Ed. Gredos. ISBN 84-249-1361-2.
2. Corominas, Joan; Pascual, José A. (1984). Vol. II: Ce-F. Gredos. ISBN 84-249-1363-9.
3. Corominas, Joan; Pascual, José A. (1984). Vol. III: G-Ma. Ed. Gredos. ISBN 84-249-1365-5.
4. Corominas, Joan; Pascual, José A. (1985). Vol. IV: Me-Re. Gredos. ISBN 84-249-0066-9.
5. Coromines, Joan; Pascual, José A. (1983). Vol. V: Ri-X. Ed. Gredos. ISBN 84-249-0879-1.
6. Corominas, Joan; Pascual, José A. (1991). Vol. VI: Y-Z, Índices. Editorial Gredos. ISBN 84-249-1456-2.
- Coromines, Joan; Gulsoy, Joseph; Cahner, Max (1980–1991), Diccionari etimològic i complementari de la llengua catalana, Barcelona: Curial, ISBN 978-84-725-6173-1
- Haensch, Günther; Omeñaca, Carlos (2004), Los diccionarios del español en el siglo XXI (2nd ed.), Salamanca: Ediciones Universidad de Salamanca, ISBN 84-7800-611-7
