= Villarmayor =

- Municipality
- Flag Coat of arms

- Location in Salamanca

- Location in Spain
- Coordinates: 41°00′53″N 5°58′19″W
- Country: Spain
- Autonomous community: Castile and León
- Province: Salamanca
- Comarca: Tierra de Ledesma

Government
  - Mayor: Camilo Sánchez Martín

Area
  - Total: 39 km^{2} (15 sq mi)
- Elevation: 830 m (2,720 ft)

Population (2025-01-01)
  - Total: 139
  - Density: 3.6/km^{2} (9.2/sq mi)
- Time zone: UTC+1 (CET)
  - Summer (DST): UTC+2 (CEST)
- Postal code: 37130

Villarmayor is a municipality located in the province of Salamanca, Castile and León, Spain. As of 2016 the municipality has a population of 195 inhabitants.
