= Juzbado =

- Municipality
- Coat of arms

- Location in Salamanca

- Location in Spain
- Coordinates: 41°04′40″N 5°51′41″W
- Country: Spain
- Autonomous community: Castile and León
- Province: Salamanca
- Comarca: Tierra de Ledesma

Government
  - Mayor: Fernando Rubio (PSOE)

Area
  - Total: 21.74 km^{2} (8.39 sq mi)
- Elevation: 796 m (2,612 ft)

Population (2025-01-01)
  - Total: 176
  - Density: 8.10/km^{2} (21.0/sq mi)
- Time zone: UTC+1 (CET)
  - Summer (DST): UTC+2 (CEST)
- Postal code: 37115
- Website: www.juzbado.es

Juzbado is a village and municipality in the province of Salamanca, western Spain, part of the autonomous community of Castile-Leon. It is located 24 kilometres (15 mi) from the provincial capital city of Salamanca and has a population of 174 people.

== Geography ==
The municipality covers an area of 21.74 km^{2} (8.39 sq mi).

It lies 796 metres (2,612 ft) above sea level.

The postal code is 37115.

== See also ==
- List of municipalities in Salamanca
