= Aldearrodrigo =

- Municipality
- Coat of arms

- Location in Salamanca

- Location in Spain
- Coordinates: 41°06′38″N 5°48′23″W
- Country: Spain
- Autonomous community: Castile and León
- Province: Salamanca
- Comarca: Tierra de Ledesma

Government
  - Mayor: Celedonio Espinosa del Arco (People's Party)

Area
  - Total: 8.4 km^{2} (3.2 sq mi)
- Elevation: 785 m (2,575 ft)

Population (2025-01-01)
  - Total: 143
  - Density: 17/km^{2} (44/sq mi)
- Time zone: UTC+1 (CET)
  - Summer (DST): UTC+2 (CEST)

Aldearrodrigo is a village and municipality in the province of Salamanca, western Spain, part of the autonomous community of Castile-Leon. It is located 24 kilometres (15 mi) from the city of Salamanca and has a population of 152 people. The municipality has an area of 8.41 km^{2} (3.25 sq mi).

The village lies 785 metres (2,575 ft) above sea level.
