= Flatflesa Lighthouse =

Coastal lighthouse in Norway

Flatflesa Lighthouse Flatflesa fyr
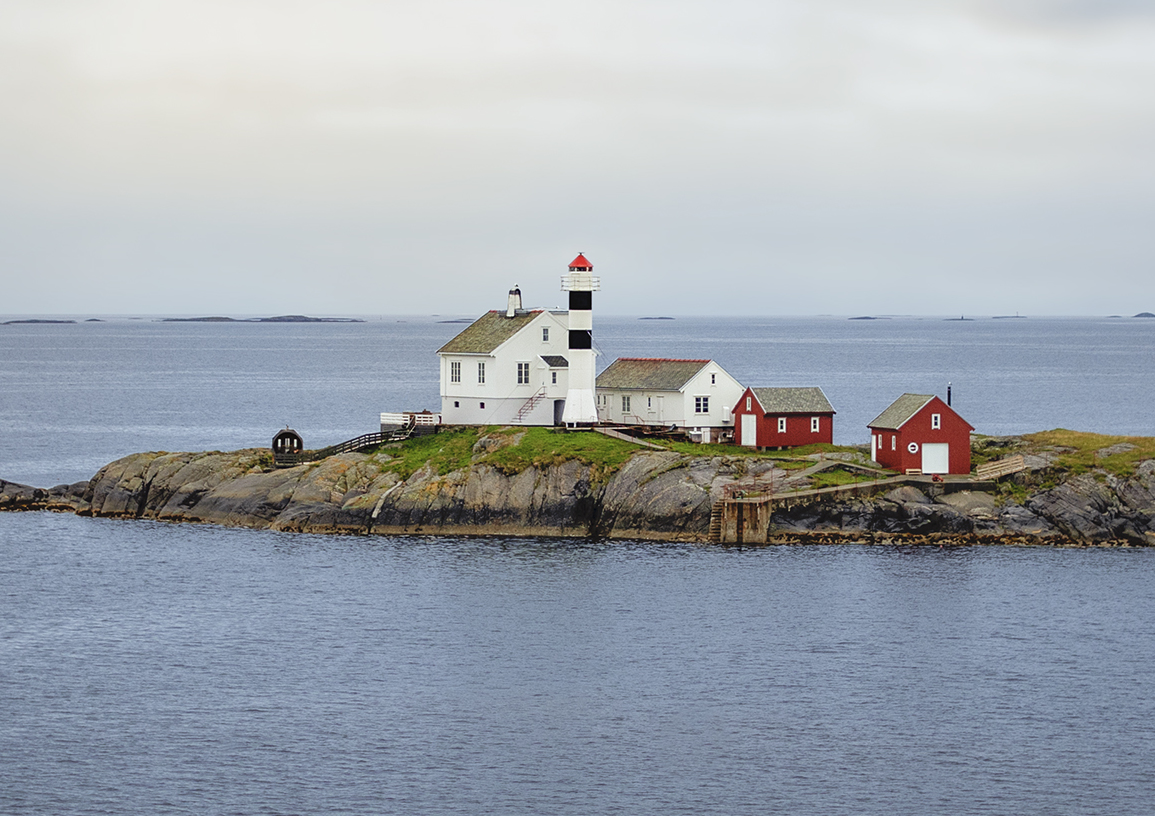
- Location: Flatflesa, Aukra Municipality, Norway
- Coordinates: 62°50′18″N 6°41′20″E

Tower
- Constructed: 20 September 1902
- Construction: fiberglass (tower)
- Automated: 1988
- Height: 13.7 m (45 ft)
- Shape: cylinder
- Markings: white, red (roof), stripe (2, black, horizontal direction)
- Heritage: cultural heritage preservation in Norway

Light
- First lit: 1988
- Focal height: 17.3 m (57 ft)
- Intensity: 30,800 candela
- Range: 11 nmi (20 km; 13 mi)
- Characteristic: Oc(3) WRG 10s

Flatflesa Lighthouse (Norwegian: Flatflesa fyr) is a coastal lighthouse located in Aukra Municipality in Møre og Romsdal county, Norway. The lighthouse lies on the small island of Flatflesa, about 9 kilometres (5.6 mi) west of the island of Gossa and about 5 kilometres (3.1 mi) east of the island of Sandøya. The original lighthouse was established in 1902 and in 1988 a new automated tower was completed.

The 11-metre (36 ft) tall round, cylindrical, fiberglass tower is white with two black stripes. The 30,800 candela light emits white, red, or green light (depending on direction) occulting three times every 10 seconds. The light can be seen for up to 11 nautical miles (20 km; 13 mi).

The lighthouse was eventually converted into a hotel. There are accommodations for a limited number of guests at the lighthouse, but it is still functioning fully.

== See also ==
- List of lighthouses in Norway
- Lighthouses in Norway
