= Villaseco de los Reyes =

- Municipality
- Coat of arms

- Location in Salamanca

- Location in Spain
- Coordinates: 41°09′00″N 6°10′59″W
- Country: Spain
- Autonomous community: Castile and León
- Province: Salamanca
- Comarca: Tierra de Ledesma

Government
  - Mayor: Arturo de Inés Calvo (People's Party)

Area
  - Total: 136 km^{2} (53 sq mi)
- Elevation: 772 m (2,533 ft)

Population (2025-01-01)
  - Total: 296
  - Density: 2.18/km^{2} (5.64/sq mi)
- Time zone: UTC+1 (CET)
  - Summer (DST): UTC+2 (CEST)
- Postal code: 37150

Villaseco de los Reyes (meaning "...of the Kings") is a village and particularly large municipality (postal code - 37150) in the province of Salamanca, western Spain, part of the autonomous community of Castile-Leon. It has a population, according to INE 2016, of 350 people. The municipality covers an area of 136.05 km² and lies 772 meters above sea level.

Its municipal term is formed by the localities of Berganciano, El Campo de Ledesma, Gejo de los Reyes, Moscosa and Gusende and Villaseco de los Reyes.

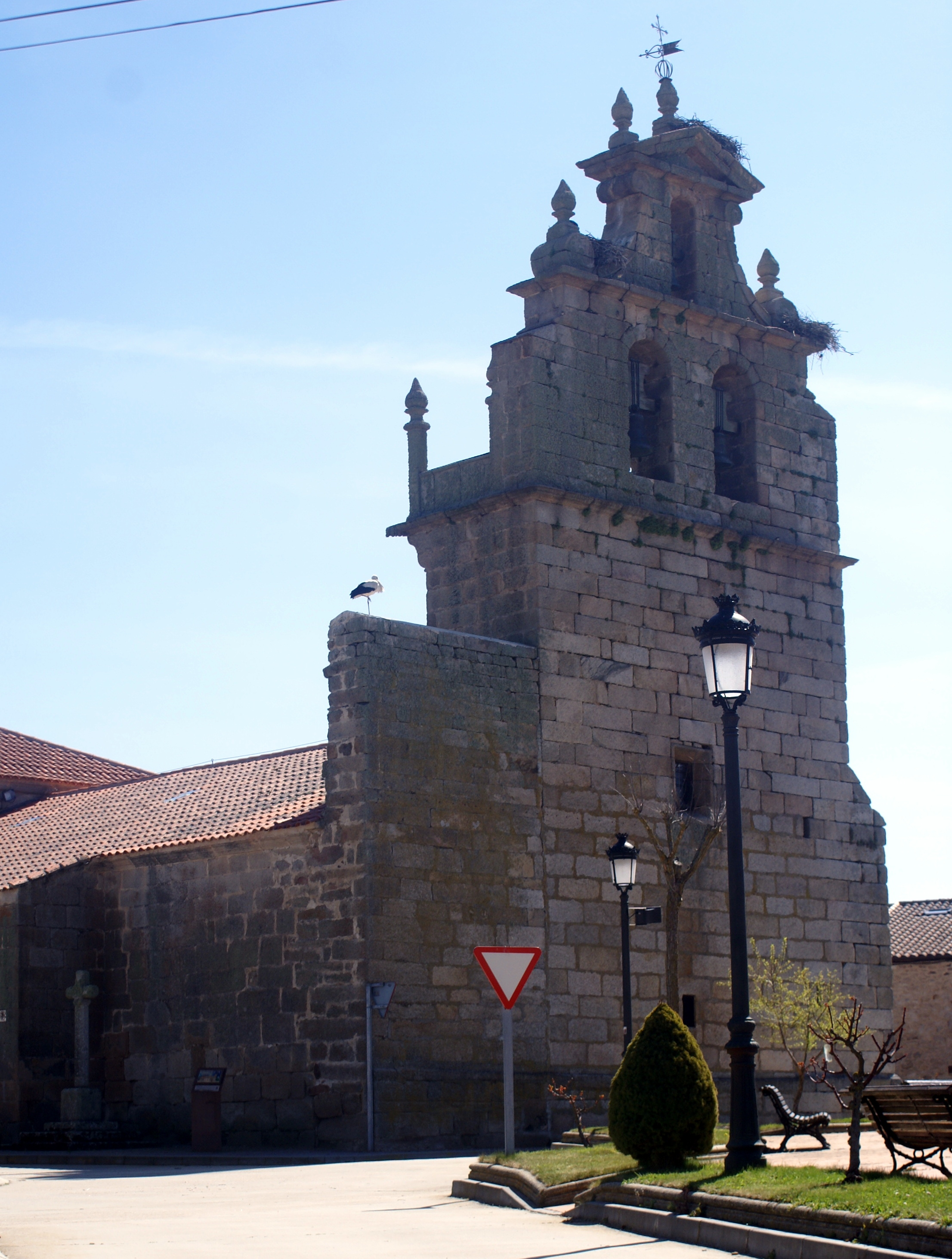
Church of Our Lady of the Immaculate Conception, in Villaseco de los Reyes. Parish Church.

== History ==
The foundation of Villaseco dates back to the Middle Ages, obeying the repopulations made by the Leonese kings in the High Middle Ages, and leaving the town in the jurisdiction of Ledesma since the creation of its alfoz by Fernando II de León in the twelfth century, as well as in his archdeaconry. ^{6}

Manuel Gómez-Moreno affirmed that the hermitage of Our Lady of the Kings of Villaseco de los Reyes was built at the end of the 13th century at the request of the Infante Don Sancho Pérez, ^{7} who was lord of Ledesma and of many other villages and was son of the infant Don Pedro and grandson of King Alfonso X the Wise.

With the creation of the current provinces in 1833, Villaseco de los Reyes was integrated into the province of Salamanca, within the Leonese Region . ^{9} Between 1965 and 1970, the Almendra dam was built near the town, flooding the most fertile lands in the north of the municipality.

== See also ==
List of municipalities in Salamanca
