= Vega de Tirados =

- Municipality
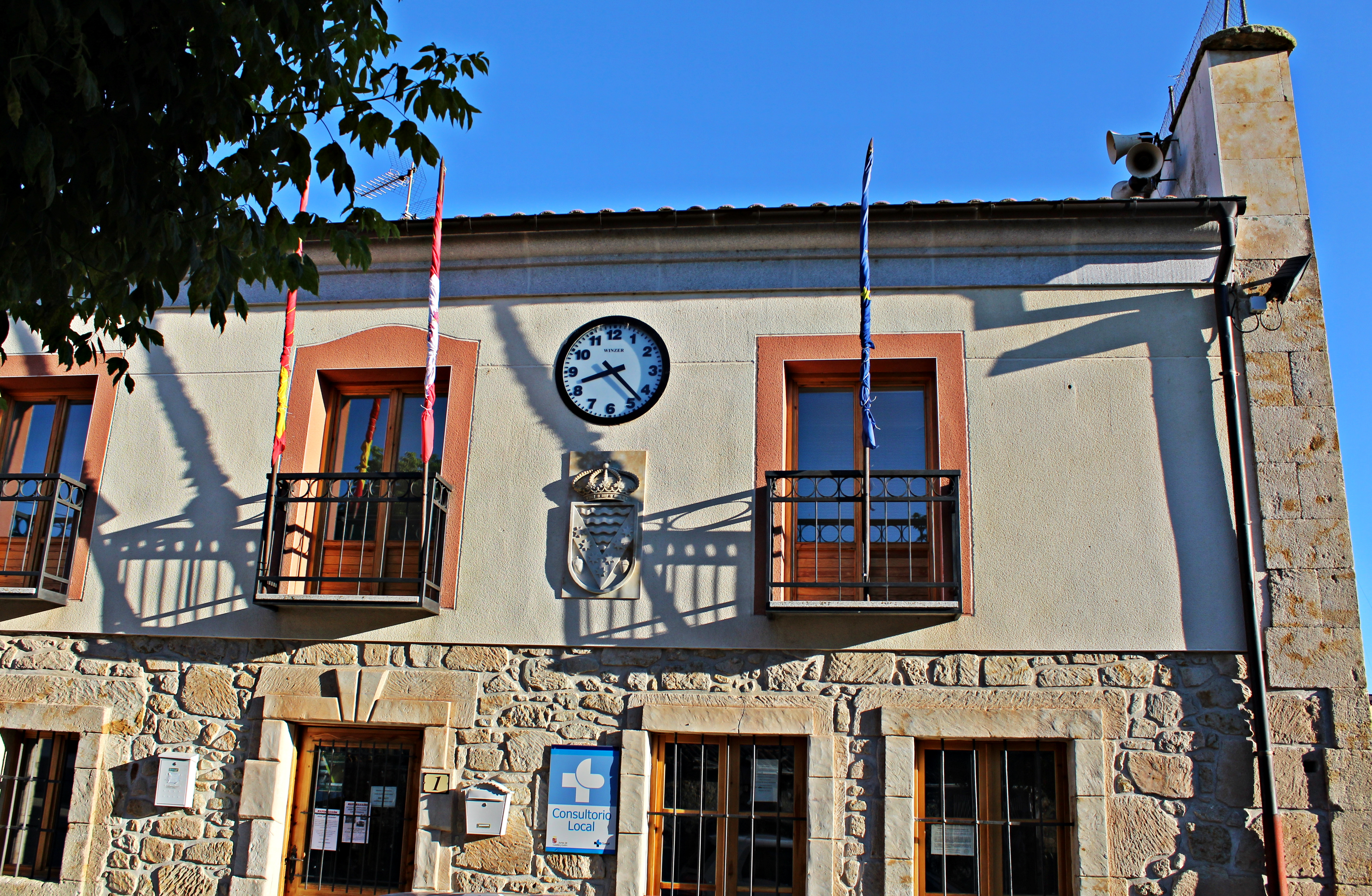

- Flag Coat of arms

- Location in Salamanca

- Location in Spain
- Coordinates: 41°04′31″N 5°53′13″W
- Country: Spain
- Autonomous community: Castile and León
- Province: Salamanca
- Comarca: Tierra de Ledesma

Government
  - Mayor: José Luis García Sánchez (PSOE)

Area
  - Total: 28.11 km^{2} (10.85 sq mi)
- Elevation: 789 m (2,589 ft)

Population (2025-01-01)
  - Total: 139
  - Density: 4.94/km^{2} (12.8/sq mi)
- Time zone: UTC+1 (CET)
  - Summer (DST): UTC+2 (CEST)
- Postal code: 37170

Vega de Tirados is a municipality located in the province of Salamanca, Castile and León, Spain. As of 2016 the municipality has a population of 180 inhabitants.
