= Diccionario crítico etimológico de la lengua castellana =

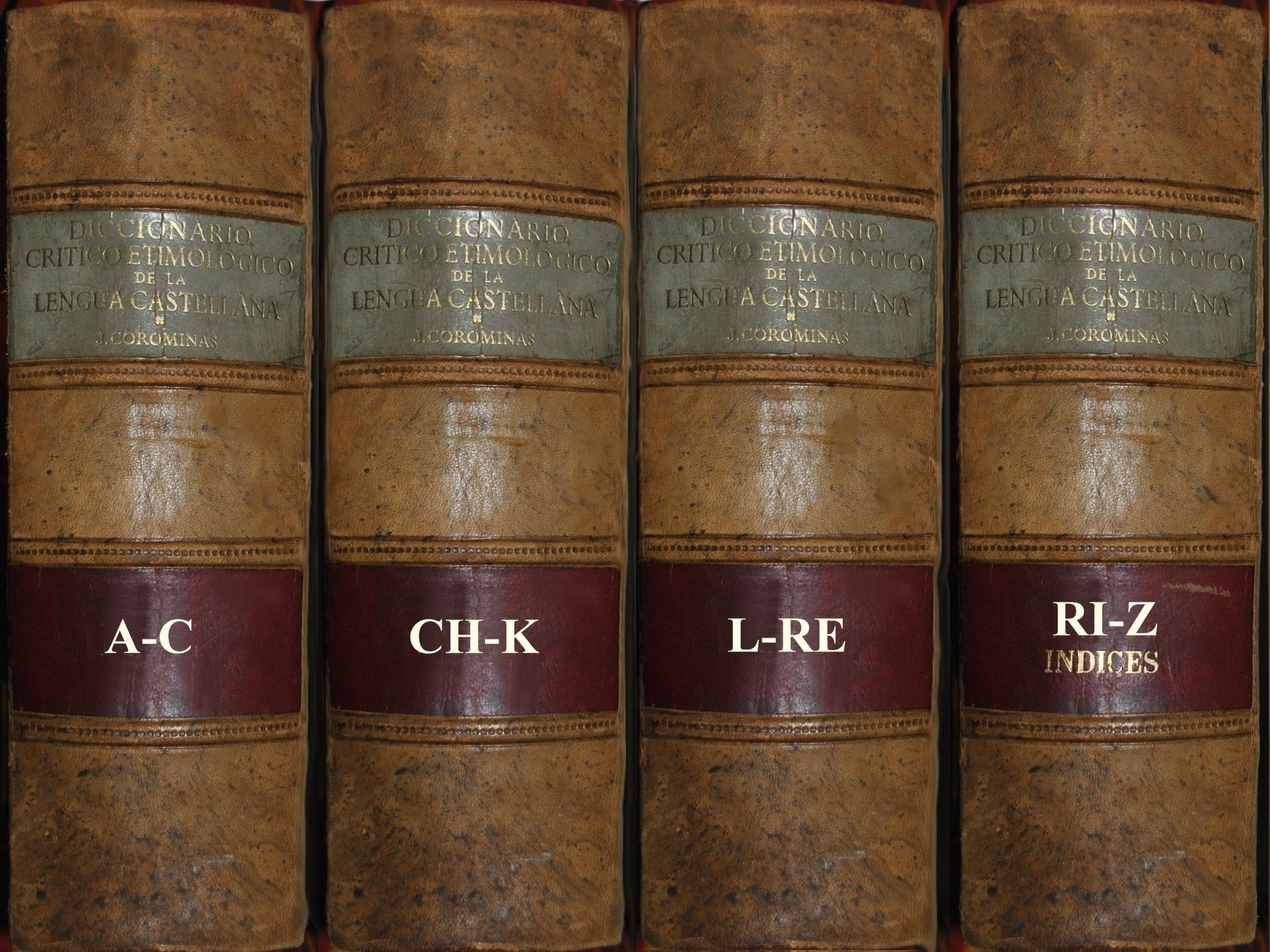
Critical etymological dictionary of the Spanish language, in four volumes (Editorial Francke - 1954)

The Diccionario crítico etimológico de la lengua castellana is a four-volume etymological dictionary of Spanish compiled by the Catalan philologist Joan Corominas (1905-1997), and first published by Francke Verlag in Bern, Switzerland, in 1954.

Its publication was followed in 1961 by that of a single-volume abridged version (Breve diccionario etimológico de la lengua castellana), and in the 1980s by a six-volume revised and expanded version (retitled Diccionario crítico etimológico castellano e hispánico).

This dictionary was praised for its ambitious approach, its exhaustive coverage of the material, its meticulous documentation, and its unprecedented candor about the unknown. As Josep Pla said: "... I have the feeling that is one of the hardest works in the country, done with a safe, rhythmic and continuous effort.. The Critical & etymological Dictionary is what it has been left behind a lonely, restless lifetime of effort...".

== Orientation of the dictionary ==
The Diccionario crítico etimológico de la lengua castellana is directed to the specialist. Many of its entries are true scientific articles, including proposals both from the author and from third parties (referencing all of them), with the testimony of other languages, both neighbouring and geographically more distant (Catalan, Old French, Baltic, High German, Old English, Nordic, Taino, Nahuatl, etc.), weighing and dispensing formulas with some opinions from conclusive studies, and finally giving a diagnosis.

The Corominas, as it is known informally, is characterized by a great intellectual honesty and respect for the viewpoints of others. Where an etymological conclusion can be stated with certainty, the author presents it in clear terms and with supporting arguments. The dictionary copes with a uniquely large body of data, and competing arguments are fully documented. Sample pages can be seen online.

== Content ==
This work has been called simply "the best etymological dictionary of Spanish." Throughout almost five thousand pages, Corominas establishes the origin and development of Castilian vocabulary, both archaic and modern, Peninsular and Latin American, often referencing other Iberian and Romance languages.

This project was begun in parallel with the author's other magnum opus, the Diccionari Etimològic i Complementari de la Llengua Catalana, an etymological dictionary of Catalan. Its lexical data base includes all the languages and dialects of the Iberian Peninsula (as well as others from beyond), including Catalan, Galician, Basque, Leonese, Judaeo-Spanish, Mozarabic, Portuguese, and Occitan/Provençal.

An essential aspect of the dictionary is its critical character. The author supports his etymological judgments and dates of first documentation by citing earlier dictionaries and historical texts, showing in detail why he accepts or rejects previous scholarship.

The Seminari de Filologia i Informàtica at the Autonomous University of Barcelona began a project in 1992 to put the dictionary in digital form.

== See also ==
- Joan Corominas
- Diccionario crítico etimológico castellano e hispánico
- Brief etymological dictionary of the Spanish language
- Diccionari Etimològic i Complementari de la Llengua Catalana

== Bibliography ==
- Agustí, Lluís (2000), "El Diccionario [crítico] etimológico castellano e hispánico de Corominas/Pascual veinte años después", Métodos de Información, 7 (35–36): 30–39
- Corominas, Joan (1954). Diccionario crítico etimológico de la lengua castellana. Madrid: Gredos. ISBN 978-84-249-1362-5.
1. Corominas, Joan. Volume I: A-C. 1954 - p. 996 (1st ed.). ISBN 978-84-249-1361-8.
2. Corominas, Joan. Volume II: CH-K. 1954 - p. 1084 (1st ed.). ISBN 978-84-249-1361-8.
3. Corominas, Joan. Volume III: L-RE. 1954 - p. 1120 (1st ed.). ISBN 978-84-249-1361-8.
4. Corominas, Joan. Volume IV: RI-Z (plus index). 1954 - p. 1227 (1ªed.). ISBN 978-84-249-1361-8.
- Corominas, Joan (1961). Breve diccionario etimológico de la lengua castellana (1st ed.). Madrid: Gredos. ISBN 978-84-249-3555-9.
- Fuster, Joan (1976-08-08), "El Coromines: Historia de las palabras", La Vanguardia, Barcelona
- Pla, Josep (1984), Darrers escrits, Barcelona: Destino
- Coromines, Joan; Gulsoy, Joseph; Cahner, Max (1980–1991), Diccionari etimològic i complementari de la llengua catalana, Barcelona: Curial, ISBN 9788472561731
- Haensch, Günther; Omeñaca, Carlos (2004), Los diccionarios del español en el siglo XXI (2nd ed.), Salamanca: Ediciones Universidad de Salamanca, ISBN 84-7800-611-7
