= Tierra de Ledesma =

- Comarca
- Location in Salamanca
- Country: Spain
- Autonomous community: Castile and León
- Province: Salamanca

Area
  - Total: 1,078.86 km^{2} (416.55 sq mi)

Population
  - Total: 7,069
  - Density: 6.552/km^{2} (16.97/sq mi)
- Time zone: UTC+1 (CET)
  - Summer (DST): UTC+2 (CEST)

Tierra de Ledesma is a comarca in the province of Salamanca, Castile and León. It contains 30 municipalities: Aldearrodrigo, Almenara de Tormes, Añover de Tormes, Doñinos de Ledesma, Encina de San Silvestre, El Arco, Gejuelo del Barro, Golpejas, Juzbado, La Mata de Ledesma, Ledesma, Monleras, Palacios del Arzobispo, Rollán, San Pedro del Valle, San Pelayo de Guareña, Sando, Santa María de Sando, Santiz, Sardón de los Frailes, Tabera de Abajo, Tremedal de Tormes, Valdelosa, Vega de Tirados, Villarmayor, Villasdardo, Villaseco de los Gamitos, Villaseco de los Reyes, Zamayón and Zarapicos.
