= Sandø =

Sandø (English: sand island) may refer to:

- Sandø, Færder, an island in Færder Municipality in Vestfold county, Norway
- Sandø, an old name for Sande Municipality in Møre og Romsdal county, Norway
- Sandø, an old name for the old Sandøy Municipality in Møre og Romsdal county, Norway

== See also ==
- Sandor (disambiguation)
- Sandøya (disambiguation), including Sandoy
- Sand Island (disambiguation)
