= San Pelayo de Guareña =

- Municipality
- Location in Salamanca

- Location in Spain
- Coordinates: 41°06′57″N 5°51′37″W
- Country: Spain
- Autonomous community: Castile and León
- Province: Salamanca
- Comarca: Tierra de Ledesma

Government
  - Mayor: Alipio Tapia Herrero (People's Party)

Area
  - Total: 28 km^{2} (11 sq mi)
- Elevation: 800 m (2,600 ft)

Population (2025-01-01)
  - Total: 86
  - Density: 3.1/km^{2} (8.0/sq mi)
- Time zone: UTC+1 (CET)
  - Summer (DST): UTC+2 (CEST)
- Postal code: 37292

San Pelayo de Guareña is a municipality located in the province of Salamanca, Castile and León, Spain. As of 2016 the municipality has a population of 99 inhabitants.
