= Tremedal de Tormes =

- Municipality
- Location in Salamanca

- Location in Spain
- Coordinates: 41°04′32″N 6°10′53″W
- Country: Spain
- Autonomous community: Castile and León
- Province: Salamanca
- Comarca: Tierra de Ledesma

Government
  - Mayor: Francisco Javier López Vicente (People's Party)

Area
  - Total: 33 km^{2} (13 sq mi)
- Elevation: 765 m (2,510 ft)

Population (2025-01-01)
  - Total: 34
  - Density: 1.0/km^{2} (2.7/sq mi)
- Time zone: UTC+1 (CET)
  - Summer (DST): UTC+2 (CEST)
- Postal code: 37590

Tremedal de Tormes is a municipality located in the province of Salamanca, Castile and León, Spain. As of 2016 the municipality has a population of 44 inhabitants.
