= Gejuelo del Barro =

- Municipality
- Location in Salamanca

- Location in Spain
- Coordinates: 41°04′38″N 6°07′25″W
- Country: Spain
- Autonomous community: Castile and León
- Province: Salamanca
- Comarca: Tierra de Ledesma

Government
  - Mayor: María Isabel Pereña Ruano (People's Party)

Area
  - Total: 43 km^{2} (17 sq mi)
- Elevation: 808 m (2,651 ft)

Population (2025-01-01)
  - Total: 31
  - Density: 0.72/km^{2} (1.9/sq mi)
- Time zone: UTC+1 (CET)
  - Summer (DST): UTC+2 (CEST)
- Postal code: 37114

Gejuelo del Barro (Spanish pronunciation: [xeˈxwelo ðel ˈβaro]) is a sparsely populated village and municipality in the province of Salamanca, western Spain, part of the autonomous community of Castile-Leon. It is located 45 kilometres (28 mi) from the provincial capital city of Salamanca and has a population of only 41 people.

== Geography ==
The municipality covers an area of 43.33 km^{2} (16.73 sq mi).

It lies 808 metres (2,651 ft) above sea level.

The postal code is 37114

== See also ==
- List of municipalities in Salamanca
