= San Pedro del Valle =

- Municipality
- Flag Coat of arms

- Location in Salamanca

- Location in Spain
- Coordinates: 41°01′59″N 5°51′37″W
- Country: Spain
- Autonomous community: Castile and León
- Province: Salamanca
- Comarca: Tierra de Ledesma

Government
  - Mayor: Alberto Torres (People's Party)

Area
  - Total: 16 km^{2} (6.2 sq mi)
- Elevation: 791 m (2,595 ft)

Population (2025-01-01)
  - Total: 143
  - Density: 8.9/km^{2} (23/sq mi)
- Time zone: UTC+1 (CET)
  - Summer (DST): UTC+2 (CEST)
- Postal code: 37170

San Pedro del Valle is a municipality located in the province of Salamanca, Castile and León, Spain. As of 2016 the municipality has a population of 147 inhabitants.
