= Lomstjønna Nature Reserve =

Nature reserve on Harøya island in Norway

- Lomstjønna naturreservat
- IUCN category Ia (strict nature reserve)
- Location within Møre og Romsdal Location within Norway
- Nearest city: Steinshamn
- Coordinates: 62°45′22″N 6°27′45″E
- Area: 11 ha (27 acres)
- Established: 1988

Ramsar Wetland
- Designated: 18 March 1996
- Part of: Harøya Wetlands System
- Reference no.: 806

The Lomstjønna Nature Reserve (Norwegian: Lomstjønna naturreservat) is located on Harøya island in Ålesund Municipality in Møre og Romsdal county, Norway.

The area received protection in 1988 "to preserve an important wetland area with associated plant communities, bird life and other wildlife", according to the conservation regulations. The reserve is based around a pond named Lomstjørna (a.k.a. Lomstjønna), located in a hilly and nutrient-poor bog landscape that is flat and uniform. The area encompasses the main pond, the bog, and several small ponds, and it forms a representative part of this landscape type on the island. Several bird species that prefer coastal heaths nest here: the greylag goose, European golden plover, sandpipers, and gulls. There are also some ducks and some special species such as the red-necked phalarope and Lapland longspur.

The reserve is one of six natural areas that were included in the Harøya Wetlands System Ramsar site, which was established in 1996.
