= Añover de Tormes =

- municipality
- Location in Salamanca

- Location in Spain
- Coordinates: 41°08′10″N 5°54′54″W
- Country: Spain
- Autonomous community: Castile and León
- Province: Salamanca
- Comarca: Tierra de Ledesma

Government
  - Mayor: Ángel Tomás Domínguez (C's)

Area
  - Total: 20 km^{2} (7.7 sq mi)
- Elevation: 802 m (2,631 ft)

Population (2025-01-01)
  - Total: 84
  - Density: 4.2/km^{2} (11/sq mi)
- Time zone: UTC+1 (CET)
  - Summer (DST): UTC+2 (CEST)
- Postal code: 37111

Añover de Tormes (Spanish pronunciation: [aɲoˈβeɾ ðe ˈtoɾmes]) is a village and municipality in the province of Salamanca, western Spain, part of the autonomous community of Castile-Leon. It is located 34 kilometres (21 mi) from the city of Salamanca and has a population of 93 people. The municipality covers an area of 20 km^{2} (7.7 sq mi).

The village lies 802 metres (2,631 ft) above sea level and the postal code is 37111.
