= Villaseco de los Gamitos =

- Municipality
- Location in Salamanca

- Location in Spain
- Coordinates: 41°02′10″N 6°08′09″W
- Country: Spain
- Autonomous community: Castile and León
- Province: Salamanca
- Comarca: Tierra de Ledesma

Government
  - Mayor: Alejandro Calvo Cuadrado (People's Party)

Area
  - Total: 12 km^{2} (4.6 sq mi)
- Elevation: 835 m (2,740 ft)

Population (2025-01-01)
  - Total: 138
  - Density: 12/km^{2} (30/sq mi)
- Time zone: UTC+1 (CET)
  - Summer (DST): UTC+2 (CEST)
- Postal code: 37114

Villaseco de los Gamitos is a village and municipality in the province of Salamanca, western Spain, part of the autonomous community of Castile-Leon. It is located 40 kilometres from the provincial capital city of Salamanca and has a population of 143 people as of 2016.

== Geography ==
The municipality covers an area of 12.32 km². It lies 835 metres above sea level and the postal code is 37114.

== See also ==
List of municipalities in Salamanca
