= El Arco, Salamanca =

El Arco
- Municipality
- Location in Salamanca

- Location in Spain
- Coordinates: 41°07′01″N 5°49′00″W
- Country: Spain
- Autonomous community: Castile and León
- Province: Salamanca
- Comarca: Tierra de Ledesma

Government
  - Mayor: Eliecer García (PSOE)

Area
  - Total: 7 km^{2} (2.7 sq mi)
- Elevation: 799 m (2,621 ft)

Population (2025-01-01)
  - Total: 85
  - Density: 12/km^{2} (31/sq mi)
- Time zone: UTC+1 (CET)
  - Summer (DST): UTC+2 (CEST)
- Postal code: 37797

El Arco is a village and municipality in the province of Salamanca, western Spain, part of the autonomous community of Castile-Leon. It is located 24 kilometers from the provincial capital city of Salamanca and has a population of 93 people.

== Geography ==
The municipality covers an area of 7 km^{2} (2.7 sq mi).

It lies 779 metres (2,556 ft) above sea level.

The postal code is 37797.

== See also ==
- List of municipalities in Salamanca
