= Almenara de Tormes =

- Municipality
- Location in Salamanca

- Location in Spain
- Coordinates: 41°03′51″N 5°49′24″W
- Country: Spain
- Autonomous community: Castile and León
- Province: Salamanca
- Comarca: Tierra de Ledesma

Government
  - Mayor: José Luis López (People's Party)

Area
  - Total: 19 km^{2} (7.3 sq mi)
- Elevation: 782 m (2,566 ft)

Population (2025-01-01)
  - Total: 302
  - Density: 16/km^{2} (41/sq mi)
- Time zone: UTC+1 (CET)
  - Summer (DST): UTC+2 (CEST)
- Postal code: 37115

Almenara de Tormes is a village and municipality in the province of Salamanca, western Spain, and is part of the autonomous community of Castile and León. It is located 18 kilometres (11 mi) from the city of Salamanca and has a population of 249 people. The municipality covers an area of 19 km^{2} (7.3 sq mi). The village lies 782 metres (2,566 ft) above sea level and the post code is 37115.

== See also ==
- List of municipalities in Salamanca
