= Sandøy Church =

- Sandøy kirke
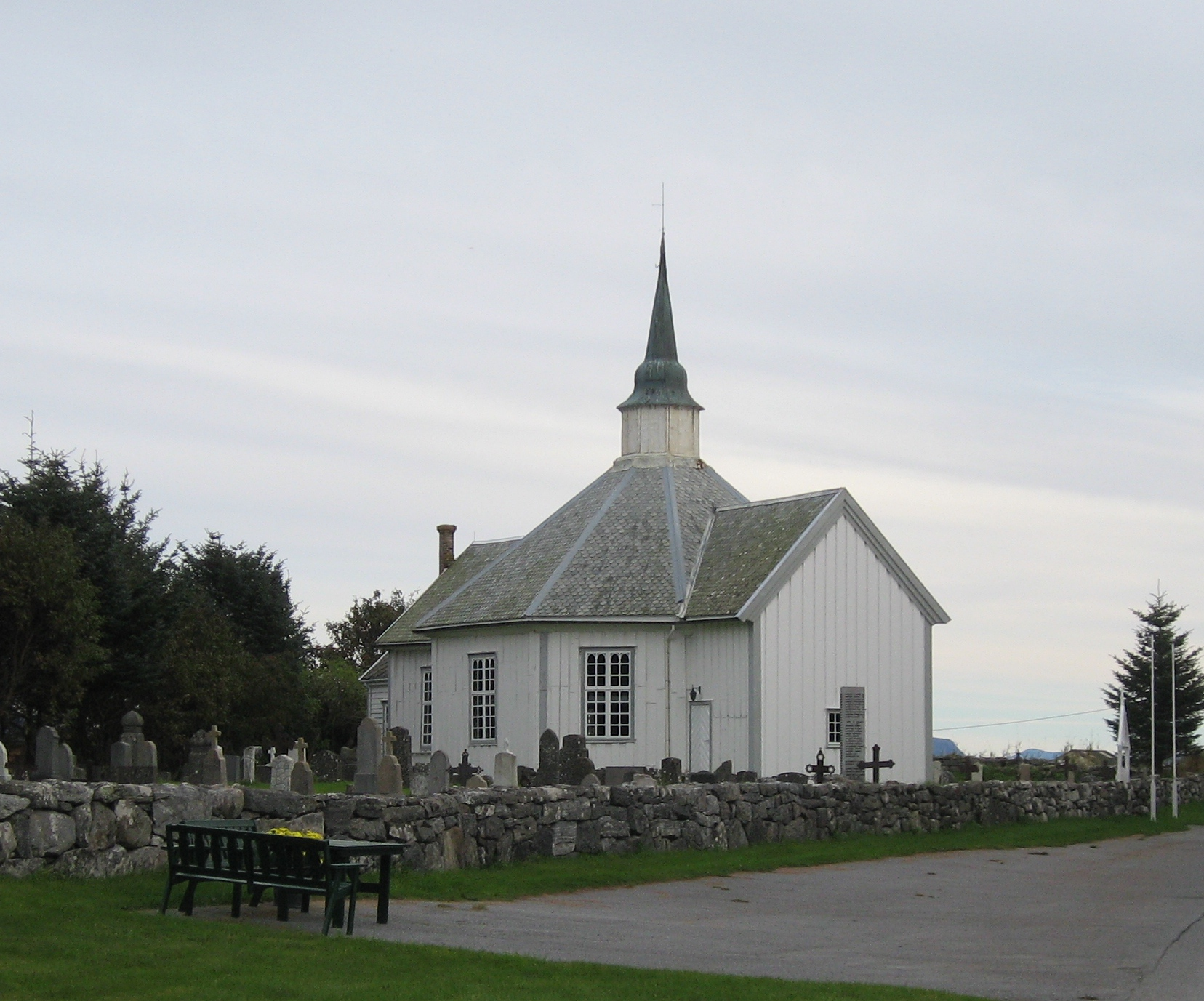
- View of the church
- Sandøy Church
- 62°49′07″N 6°35′03″E
- Location: Ålesund Municipality, Møre og Romsdal
- Country: Norway
- Denomination: Church of Norway
- Churchmanship: Evangelical Lutheran

History
- Status: Parish church
- Founded: 14th century
- Consecrated: 20 September 1812

Architecture
- Functional status: Active
- Architectural type: Octagonal
- Completed: 1812 (214 years ago)

Specifications
- Capacity: 250
- Materials: Wood

Administration
- Diocese: Møre bispedømme
- Deanery: Nordre Sunnmøre prosti
- Parish: Sandøy
- Norwegian Cultural Heritage Site
- Type: Church
- Status: Automatically protected
- ID: 85397

Sandøy Church (Norwegian: Sandøy kyrkje) is a parish church of the Church of Norway in Ålesund Municipality in Møre og Romsdal county, Norway. It is located on the small island of Sandøya. It is one of the two churches for the Sandøy parish which is part of the Nordre Sunnmøre prosti (deanery) in the Diocese of Møre. The white, wooden church was built in an octagonal design in 1812 using plans drawn up by an unknown architect. The church seats about 250 people.

== History ==
The earliest existing historical records of the church date back to 1589, but it was an old, dilapidated building by that time. At that time, it was located on the eastern coast of the island of Sandøya and originally the church was an annex chapel to the main Aukra Church in the Aukra prestegjeld. Since this annex church was built on a rocky island, there was no graveyard surrounding the church. Parishioners had to travel to Aukra Church to bury their dead.

During the 1600s, the church fell into disuse due to its poor condition, with residents using the churches on the neighboring islands of Harøya and Ona. In 1670, the church on Ona was damaged in a storm and then in 1708, the church in Ona was torn down and rebuilt on Sandøy, since the church there had long since been abandoned. The "new" Sandøy Church was in the same location where the historic building had once stood. In 1812, both the Sandøy Church and Harøy Church were in poor condition, so they both were torn down. To replace them, a single new church was constructed on the opposite side of the island of Sandøya (closer to Harøya island), about 630 metres (2,070 ft) northwest of the former location. The new church was a timber-framed octagonal building. This new building was built on better ground, so it was able to have a graveyard around the church. The new church was consecrated on 20 September 1812.

== See also ==
- List of churches in Møre
