= Tabera de Abajo =

- Municipality
- Location in Salamanca

- Location in Spain
- Coordinates: 40°54′37″N 6°00′04″W
- Country: Spain
- Autonomous community: Castile and León
- Province: Salamanca
- Comarca: Tierra de Ledesma

Government
  - Mayor: J. Antonio Sánchez (People's Party)

Area
  - Total: 64 km^{2} (25 sq mi)
- Elevation: 814 m (2,671 ft)

Population (2025-01-01)
  - Total: 97
  - Density: 1.5/km^{2} (3.9/sq mi)
- Time zone: UTC+1 (CET)
  - Summer (DST): UTC+2 (CEST)
- Postal code: 37491

Tabera de Abajo is a municipality located in the province of Salamanca, Castile and León, Spain. As of 2016 the municipality has a population of 111 inhabitants.
