= Sando, Salamanca =

Sando
- Municipality
- Location in Salamanca

- Location in Spain
- Coordinates: 40°58′02″N 6°06′41″W
- Country: Spain
- Autonomous community: Castile and León
- Province: Salamanca
- Comarca: Tierra de Ledesma

Government
  - Mayor: Ampelio Vicente Herrero (People's Party)

Area
  - Total: 61 km^{2} (24 sq mi)
- Elevation: 841 m (2,759 ft)

Population (2025-01-01)
  - Total: 111
  - Density: 1.8/km^{2} (4.7/sq mi)
- Time zone: UTC+1 (CET)
  - Summer (DST): UTC+2 (CEST)
- Postal code: 37468

Sando is a municipality located in the province of Salamanca, Castile and León, Spain. As of 2016 the municipality has a population of 132 inhabitants.
