= La Mata de Ledesma =

- Municipality
- Location in Salamanca

- Location in Spain
- Coordinates: 41°00′02″N 5°58′15″W
- Country: Spain
- Autonomous community: Castile and León
- Province: Salamanca
- Comarca: Tierra de Ledesma

Government
  - Mayor: José Díez (People's Party)

Area
  - Total: 38.65 km^{2} (14.92 sq mi)
- Elevation: 814 m (2,671 ft)

Population (2025-01-01)
  - Total: 98
  - Density: 2.5/km^{2} (6.6/sq mi)
- Time zone: UTC+1 (CET)
  - Summer (DST): UTC+2 (CEST)
- Postal code: 37130

La Mata de Ledesma is a village and municipality in the province of Salamanca, western Spain, part of the autonomous community of Castile-Leon. It is located 30 kilometres (19 mi) from the provincial capital city of Salamanca and has a population of 110 people.

== Geography ==
The municipality covers an area of 38.55 km^{2} (14.88 sq mi).

It lies 814 metres (2,671 ft) above sea level.

The postal code is 37130.

== See also ==
- List of municipalities in Salamanca
