= Santa María de Sando =

- Municipality
- Location in Salamanca

- Location in Spain
- Coordinates: 40°58′42″N 6°06′48″W
- Country: Spain
- Autonomous community: Castile and León
- Province: Salamanca
- Comarca: Tierra de Ledesma

Government
  - Mayor: Luisa García (People's Party)

Area
  - Total: 14 km^{2} (5.4 sq mi)
- Elevation: 826 m (2,710 ft)

Population (2025-01-01)
  - Total: 91
  - Density: 6.5/km^{2} (17/sq mi)
- Time zone: UTC+1 (CET)
  - Summer (DST): UTC+2 (CEST)
- Postal code: 37468

Santa María de Sando is a municipality located in the province of Salamanca, Castile and León, Spain. As of 2016, the municipality has a population of 119 inhabitants. Its postal code is 37468.
