= Monleras =

- Municipality
- Location in Salamanca

- Location in Spain
- Coordinates: 41°11′09″N 6°13′37″W
- Country: Spain
- Autonomous community: Castile and León
- Province: Salamanca
- Comarca: Tierra de Ledesma

Government
  - Mayor: Ángel Delgado (People's Party)

Area
  - Total: 32.84 km^{2} (12.68 sq mi)
- Elevation: 757 m (2,484 ft)

Population (2025-01-01)
  - Total: 241
  - Density: 7.34/km^{2} (19.0/sq mi)
- Time zone: UTC+1 (CET)
  - Summer (DST): UTC+2 (CEST)
- Postal code: 37171

Monleras is a municipality located in the Northwest of the province of Salamanca, Castile and León, Spain, near the Tormes river. According to the 2024 census (INE), the municipality has a population of 245 inhabitants.
