= Harøy Church =

Church in Møre og Romsdal, Norway

- Harøy kirke
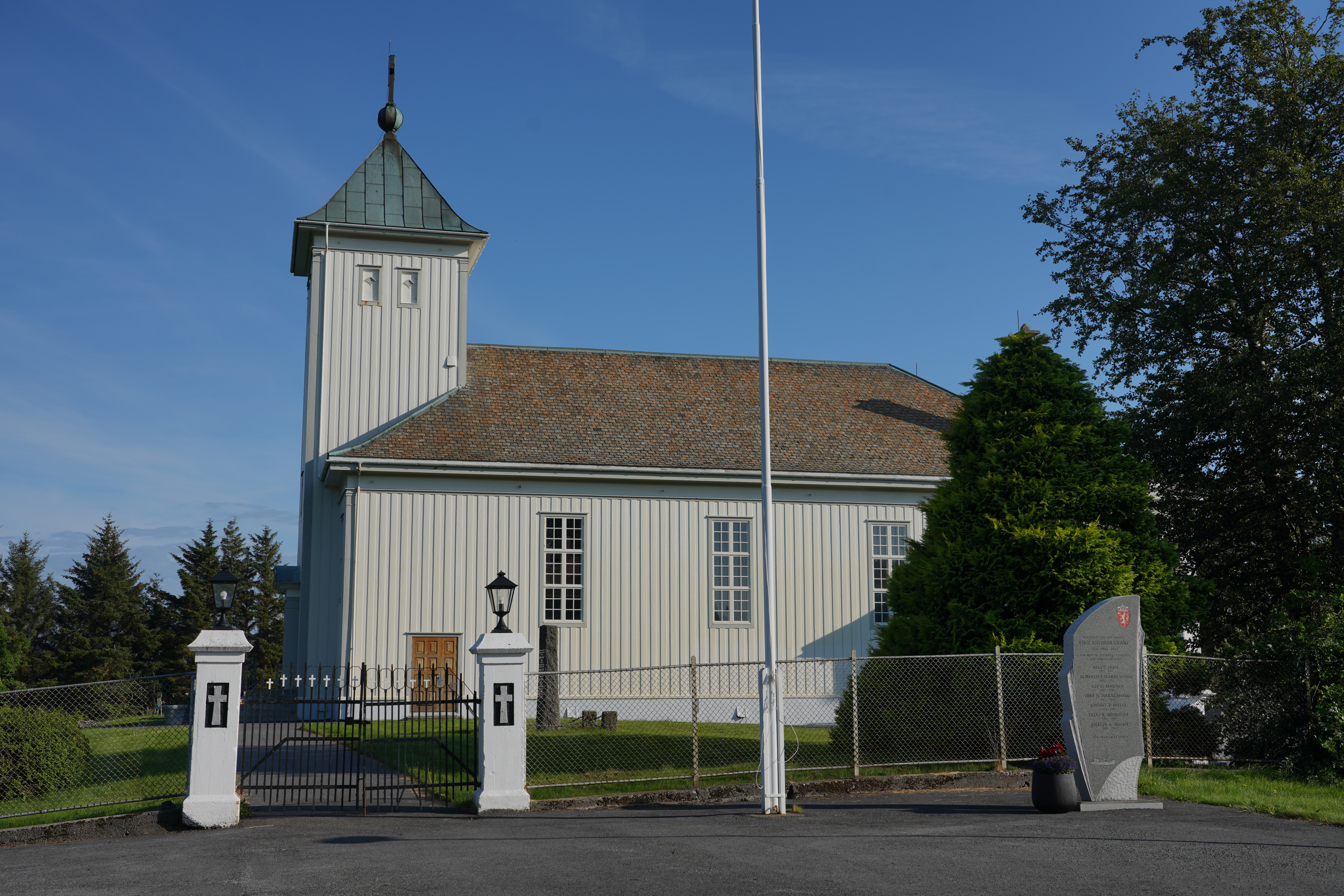
- View of the church
- Harøy Church
- 62°45′42″N 6°27′31″E
- Location: Ålesund Municipality, Møre og Romsdal
- Country: Norway
- Denomination: Church of Norway
- Churchmanship: Evangelical Lutheran

History
- Status: Parish church
- Founded: 14th century
- Consecrated: 9 June 1934

Architecture
- Functional status: Active
- Architect(s): Fredrik Ziegler Kavli and Paul S. Michelsen
- Architectural type: Long church
- Completed: 1934 (92 years ago)
- Closed: 1812-1934

Specifications
- Capacity: 340
- Materials: Wood

Administration
- Diocese: Møre bispedømme
- Deanery: Nordre Sunnmøre prosti
- Parish: Sandøy
- Norwegian Cultural Heritage Site
- Type: Church
- Status: Listed
- ID: 84487

Harøy Church (Norwegian: Harøy kyrkje) is a parish church of the Church of Norway in Ålesund Municipality in Møre og Romsdal county, Norway. It is located in the central part of the island of Harøya, just north of the Lomstjønna Nature Reserve. It is one of the two churches for the Sandøy parish which is part of the Nordre Sunnmøre prosti (deanery) in the Diocese of Møre. The white, wooden church was built in a long church design in 1934 using plans drawn up by the architects Fredrik Ziegler Kavli and Paul S. Michelsen. The church seats about 340 people.

== History ==
The earliest existing historical records of the church date back to 1589, but it was described as an old, dilapidated building at that time. The first church at Harøy was a wooden stave church located at Huse, about 1.2 kilometres (0.75 mi) north of the present location of the church. It was possibly built during the 14th century. Originally the church was an annex chapel to the main Aukra Church. Since this annex church was built on a rocky island, there was no graveyard surrounding the church. Parishioners had to travel to Aukra Church to bury their dead. In 1625, the church was described as being in very poor shape. It must have been repaired around that time. Again in 1786, the church was said to be in poor condition.

In 1812, after years of neglect and lack of repairs, both the Sandøy Church and Harøy Church were in poor condition, so they both were torn down. To replace them both, a single new church was constructed on the west side of the island of Sandøya, about 630 metres (2,070 ft) northwest of the former location of the Sandøy Church which made it closer to Harøya island than the previous location of the church. This meant that the residents of Harøya island had to travel by boat to Sandøy Church rather than having a church on their own island. This new building was built on better ground, so it was able to have a graveyard around the church, but this left no church on the island of Harøya any more.

In 1907, a new graveyard was built on the island of Harøya so that residents didn't have to travel as far to bury their dead. The graveyard was located about 1.2 kilometres (0.75 mi) south of the site of the Old Harøy Church. Soon after, people began to push for a new church to be built alongside the cemetery. In 1913, a committee was appointed to work for the church on the island. In the beginning, there was a desire for a stone building before ending up with a decision to build a wooden church, not least for financial reasons. Planning for the new church took many years. A number of draft drawings were submitted and evaluated, especially from Fredrik Ziegler Kavli and Ole Havnæs. Drafts prepared by Kavli were chosen and they were further developed after Kavli's death in 1930 by Paul S. Michelsen. These drawing were used for the construction of the new church. Formal permission to build the church was granted by a Royal Decree on 24 February 1933. The church was consecrated on 9 June 1934. On the same day, a memorial stone was unveiled at the old medieval church site.

== See also ==
- List of churches in Møre
