= Doñinos de Ledesma =

- Municipality
- Location in Salamanca

- Location in Spain
- Coordinates: 41°00′46″N 6°02′00″W
- Country: Spain
- Autonomous community: Castile and León
- Province: Salamanca
- Comarca: Tierra de Ledesma

Government
  - Mayor: Eusebio Fernández Sánchez (PSOE)

Area
  - Total: 46.15 km^{2} (17.82 sq mi)
- Elevation: 846 m (2,776 ft)

Population (2025-01-01)
  - Total: 62
  - Density: 1.3/km^{2} (3.5/sq mi)
- Time zone: UTC+1 (CET)
  - Summer (DST): UTC+2 (CEST)
- Postal code: 37139

Doñinos de Ledesma is a village and municipality in the province of Salamanca, western Spain, part of the autonomous community of Castile and León. It has a population of 68 people.

== Geography ==
The municipality covers an area of 46.15 km^{2} (17.82 sq mi). It lies 846 metres (2,776 ft) above sea level and the postal code is 37139.

== See also ==
- List of municipalities in Salamanca
