= Ona Lighthouse =

Ona Lighthouse Ona Fyr
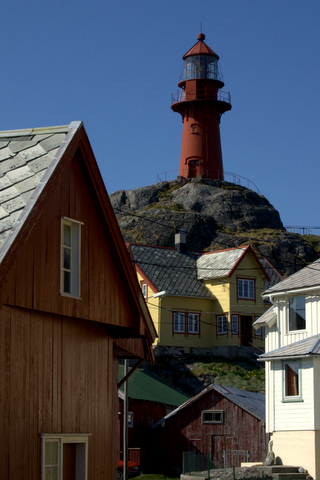
- Ona lighthouse on Onakalven cliff
- Location: Onakalven, Ona, Ålesund Municipality, Norway
- Coordinates: 62°51′48″N 6°32′38″E

Tower
- Constructed: 1867
- Construction: cast iron (tower)
- Automated: 1971
- Height: 14.7 m (48 ft)
- Shape: cylinder
- Markings: red
- Heritage: cultural property
- Racon: O

Light
- Focal height: 40 m (130 ft)
- Intensity: 79,000 candela (white), 295,000 candela (red)
- Range: 17.8 nmi (33.0 km; 20.5 mi)
- Characteristic: F W Fl R 30s

Ona Lighthouse (Norwegian: Ona fyr) is located on the small island of Ona in Ålesund Municipality in Møre og Romsdal county, Norway. The lighthouse is built on Onakalven, the highest cliff on the island overlooking the harbor and the few, clustered wooden houses on this small island. The original rotating Fresnel lens remains in use.

== History ==
The lighthouse was built in 1867 and was fully automated in 1971. The 14.7-metre (48 ft) tall round cast iron lighthouse is red and the light sits at an elevation of 40 metres (130 ft) above sea level. The continuous white light shines all night long and it also has a bright red flash every 30 seconds. The main light has an intensity of 79,000 candela and the red flash has an intensity of 295,000 candela. The lighthouse is in operation from 16 July until 21 May each year; it does not operate during the rest of the year due to the midnight sun in May–July. The light can be seen for up to 17.8 nautical miles (33.0 km; 20.5 mi).

== See also ==
- List of lighthouses in Norway
- Lighthouses in Norway
