= Ona, Møre og Romsdal =

Village and island group in Ålesund Municipality, Norway

Ona
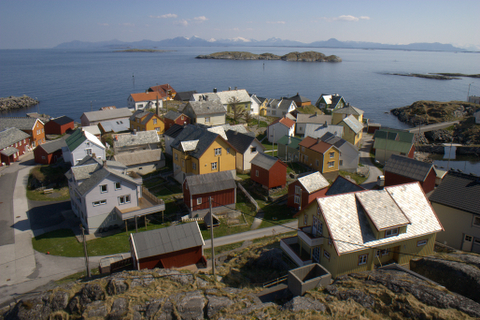
- View of Ona village
- Interactive map of Ona

Geography
- Location: Møre og Romsdal, Norway
- Coordinates: 62.8603°N 6.5543°E
- Archipelago: Ona
- Total islands: 2
- Major islands: Ona, Husøya

Administration
- Norway
- County: Møre og Romsdal
- Municipality: Ålesund Municipality

Ona is a village and an island group located in Ålesund Municipality in Møre og Romsdal county, Norway. The tiny island of Ona and the larger island of Husøya are separated by a shallow 15-metre (49 ft) wide waterway. The two islands are collectively referred to as Ona. The islands are located 4 kilometres (2.5 mi) northwest of the island of Sandøya.

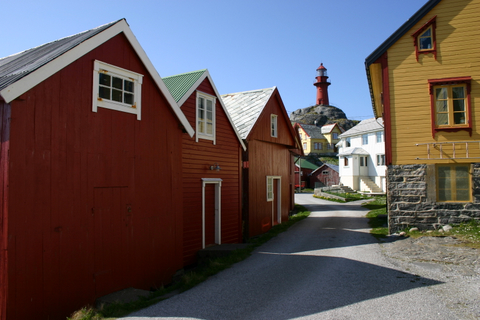
View of Ona Lighthouse on Ona

The historic village of Ona covers most of the tiny island of Ona. The highest point on Ona, the Onakalven cliff, is the site of the Ona Lighthouse, which was built in 1867. The lighthouse and the tiny island itself has become a well known tourist spot in Western Norway. It has a ferry connection with the other islands in Ålesund and to the island of Gossa in Aukra Municipality.

The island has a population of about 20, with a gradually diminishing population for the last 50 years. Ona has been populated for centuries because of the proximity to the fishing grounds further out to the Atlantic Ocean, and fishing has traditionally been the only source of income. Lately, several pottery artists have moved to the island.

Ona was featured, along with "Morning Song" by Babe Rainbow, in the Allstate Insurance Company's (U.S.) television commercial in 2020.

== Municipal dispute ==
On 30 January 2025, the County Governor of Møre og Romsdal announced that the government had authorized the transfer of the islands of Ona and Sandøya from Ålesund Municipality to the neighboring Aukra Municipality. This came only four years after the merger that consolidated Sandøy Municipality into Ålesund Municipality. Local islanders had since argued that the local authorities in Ålesund city (a three-hour drive from the islands) were too far away, expressing their fear of being neglected and marginalised. For centuries, the Ona, Sandøya, and Aukra were part of the same church parish and they have had strong economic connections through fishery and are still strongly interrelated up to this day. A few days later on 7 February 2025, after a change in the governing coalition in the Storting, the government announced that this decision was reversed and despite the local residents' desires to change municipality, the islands would remain part of Ålesund Municipality.

== Climate ==
Ona has an oceanic climate (Köppen: Cfb) with cool/mild summers and relatively mild winters with considerable rainfall.

Climate data for Ona II 1991–2020 (20 m)
Month	Jan	Feb	Mar	Apr	May	Jun	Jul	Aug	Sep	Oct	Nov	Dec	Year
Mean daily maximum °C (°F)	5.4 (41.7)	4.9 (40.8)	5.6 (42.1)	7.8 (46.0)	10.6 (51.1)	13 (55)	15.4 (59.7)	16.1 (61.0)	14.2 (57.6)	10.6 (51.1)	7.9 (46.2)	6.1 (43.0)	9.8 (49.6)
Daily mean °C (°F)	3.9 (39.0)	3.2 (37.8)	3.8 (38.8)	5.5 (41.9)	8.1 (46.6)	10.7 (51.3)	13.2 (55.8)	14.2 (57.6)	12.5 (54.5)	9.2 (48.6)	6.5 (43.7)	4.5 (40.1)	7.9 (46.3)
Mean daily minimum °C (°F)	2 (36)	1.6 (34.9)	2.1 (35.8)	3.8 (38.8)	6.3 (43.3)	9.3 (48.7)	11.6 (52.9)	12.4 (54.3)	10.6 (51.1)	7.2 (45.0)	4.7 (40.5)	2.8 (37.0)	6.2 (43.2)
Average precipitation mm (inches)	138 (5.4)	120 (4.7)	118 (4.6)	74 (2.9)	64 (2.5)	74 (2.9)	73 (2.9)	110 (4.3)	142 (5.6)	153 (6.0)	130 (5.1)	161 (6.3)	1,357 (53.2)
Source 1: NOAA
Source 2: yr.no (precipitation)
