= Sandøya, Møre og Romsdal =

Island in Møre og Romsdal, Norway

Sandøya
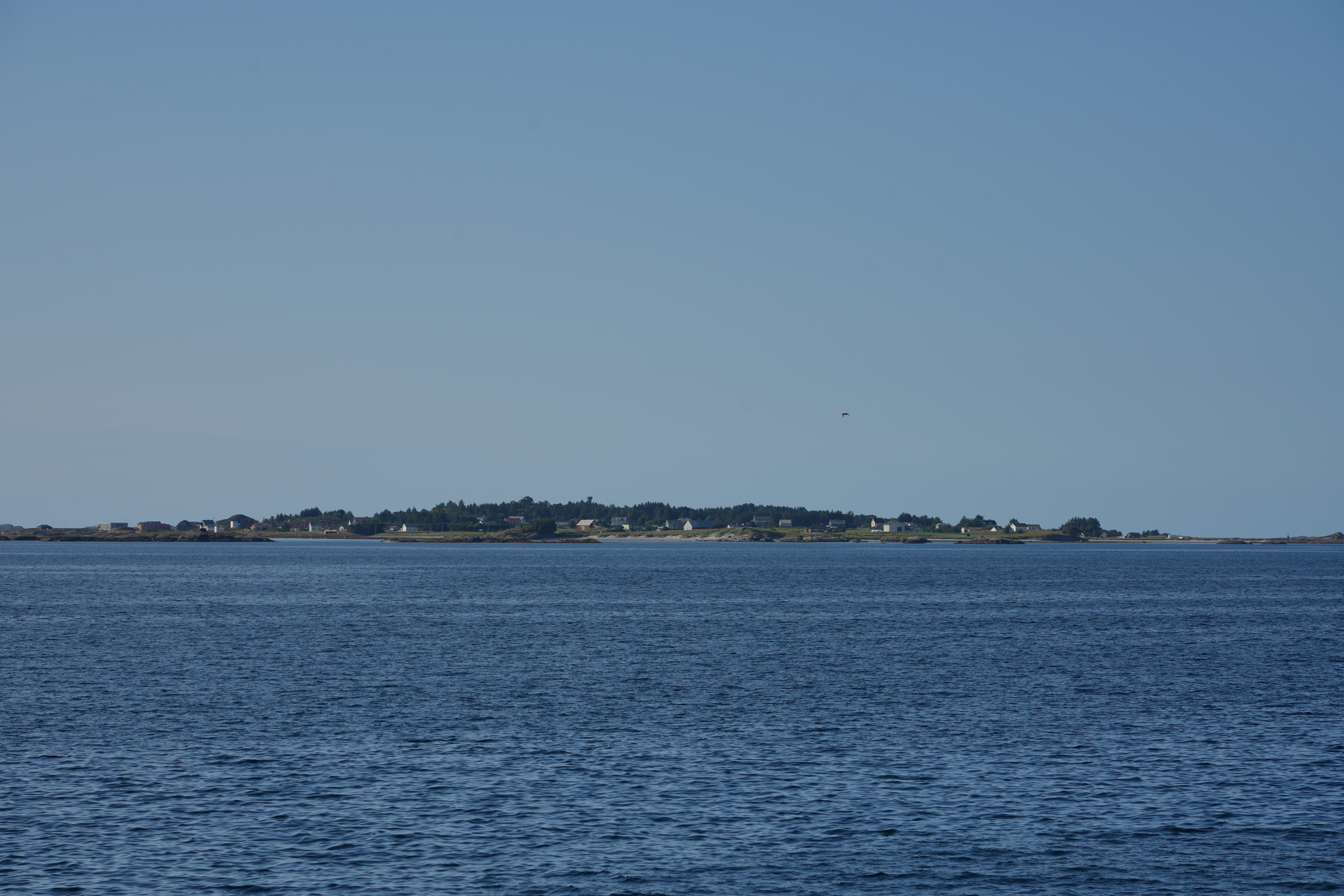
- Interactive map of Sandøya

Geography
- Location: Møre og Romsdal, Norway
- Coordinates: 62.8186°N 6.5841°E
- Area: 1.1 km^{2} (0.42 sq mi)
- Length: 1.8 km (1.12 mi)
- Width: 1.3 km (0.81 mi)
- Coastline: 6 km (3.7 mi)
- Highest elevation: 36 m (118 ft)
- Highest point: Bustihaugen

Administration
- Norway
- County: Møre og Romsdal
- Municipality: Ålesund Municipality

Sandøya is an island in Ålesund Municipality in Møre og Romsdal county, Norway. The 1.1-square-kilometre (270-acre) island was the namesake of the old Sandøy Municipality. The highest point on the island is the 36-metre (118 ft) tall hill Bustihaugen. The island has ferry connections to the nearby islands of Finnøya, Ona, and Orta. The historic Sandøy Church is located on this island.

The mostly flat island is sparsely inhabited and has some narrow paved public roads that give motorised transport access to most of the island's properties, although everything is within a walking distance reach. During summer, taking the bike to the island's sand beaches is a popular attraction. Close by the ferry port, there is a small grocery store. Ferry crossings to the island are free of charge for both passengers and vehicles. The vessel has a limited capacity of 21 cars and there are no pre-booking options. Therefore, islanders have priority over other travellers in cases of high demand.

== Municipal dispute ==
On 30 January 2025, the County Governor of Møre og Romsdal announced that the government had authorized the transfer of the islands of Ona and Sandøya from Ålesund Municipality to the neighboring Aukra Municipality. This came only four years after the merger that consolidated Sandøy Municipality into Ålesund Municipality. Local islanders had since argued that the local authorities in Ålesund city (a three-hour drive from the islands) were too far away, expressing their fear of being neglected and marginalised. For centuries, the Ona, Sandøya, and Aukra were part of the same church parish and they have had strong economic connections through fishery and are still strongly interrelated up to this day. A few days later on 7 February 2025, after a change in the governing coalition in the Storting, the government announced that this decision was reversed and despite the local residents' desires to change municipality, the islands would remain part of Ålesund Municipality.

== See also ==
- List of islands of Norway
