= Roberto Ledesma (poet) =

Argentine poet

Robert Ledesma (1901–1966) was an Argentine writer. La Llama, a collection of his poems, was published in 1954.
