= Diccionario crítico etimológico castellano e hispánico =

Etymological dictionary of the Spanish language

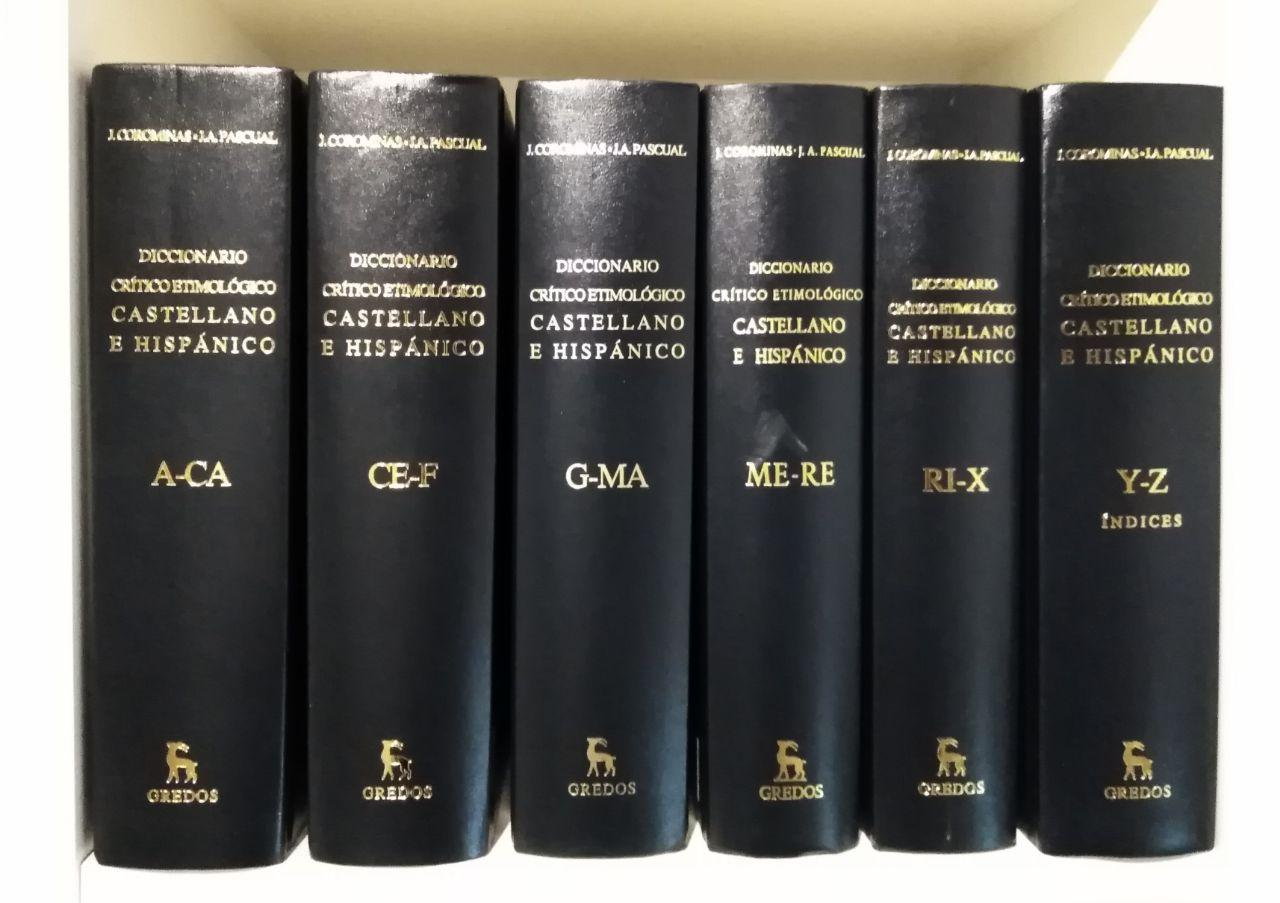
- All six volumes of the Diccionario
- Author: Joan Coromines with José Antonio Pascual
- Country: Spain
- Language: Spanish
- Publisher: Gredos
- Published: 1980–1991

The Diccionario crítico etimológico castellano e hispánico (Spanish for 'Critical castilian and hispanic etymological dictionary') is a discursive etymological dictionary of Spanish compiled by Joan Coromines (also spelled Corominas) in collaboration with José Antonio Pascual. It was completed in the late 1970s and published in five volumes in the early 1980s. The entries Y and Z plus an index of the five volumes was published as a sixth volume in 1991. The dictionary is an expansion and consolidation of earlier etymological publications by Corominas, particularly the mid-1950s Diccionario crítico etimológico de la lengua castellana.

== Content ==
This work has been called simply "the best etymological dictionary of Spanish". Throughout more than six thousand pages, Corominas establishes the origin and development of Castilian vocabulary, both archaic and modern, Peninsular and Latin American, often referencing other Iberian and Romance languages.

The adjective "Hispanic" in the title is used in a broad sense, recognizing that the historical study of the Spanish language must take into account its interactions with other languages. Thus, Galician, Galician-Portuguese, Leonese, Asturian, Aragonese, Catalan, and the now-extinct Mozarabic are mentioned in the context of their lexical influence on Spanish.

The dictionary includes not only the core vocabulary of Latin- and Romance-derived words, but also words of non-Romance origin, notably Basque, Arabic, and languages of the Americas.

An essential aspect of the dictionary is its critical character. The author supports his etymological judgments and dates of first documentation by citing earlier dictionaries and historical texts, showing in detail why he accepts or rejects previous scholarship.

The Seminari de Filologia i Informàtica at the Autonomous University of Barcelona began a project in 1992 to put the dictionary in digital form.
