= Steinshamn =

Village in Ålesund Municipality, Norway

- Village
- Interactive map of Steinshamn
- Location within Møre og Romsdal Location within Norway
- Coordinates: 62.7839°N 6.4706°E
- Country: Norway
- Region: Western Norway
- County: Møre og Romsdal
- District: Sunnmøre
- Municipality: Ålesund Municipality

Area
  - Total: 0.59 km^{2} (0.23 sq mi)
- Elevation: 5 m (16 ft)

Population (2024)
  - Total: 429
  - Density: 727/km^{2} (1,880/sq mi)
- Time zone: UTC+01:00 (CET)
  - Summer (DST): UTC+02:00 (CEST)
- Post Code: 6487 Harøy

Steinshamn is a village in Ålesund Municipality in Møre og Romsdal county, Norway. The village is located at the northern end of the island of Harøya. There is a causeway that connects Steinshamn to the neighboring island of Finnøya to the northeast.

The 0.59-square-kilometre (150-acre) village has a population (2024) of 429 and a population density of 727 inhabitants per square kilometre (1,880/sq mi).

Harøy Church lies about 2 kilometres (1.2 mi) to the south and the village of Myklebust lies 7 kilometres (4.3 mi) to the south.

== History ==
The village was the administrative centre of the old Sandøy Municipality until 2020 when it became part of Ålesund Municipality.
