= Finnøya, Møre og Romsdal =

Island in Møre og Romsdal, Norway

Finnøya
- Interactive map of Finnøya

Geography
- Location: Møre og Romsdal, Norway
- Coordinates: 62.7998°N 6.5017°E
- Area: 0.6 km^{2} (0.23 sq mi)
- Length: 1.5 km (0.93 mi)
- Width: 1 km (0.6 mi)
- Coastline: 7.5 km (4.66 mi)

Administration
- Norway
- County: Møre og Romsdal
- Municipality: Ålesund Municipality

Finnøya is an island in Ålesund Municipality in Møre og Romsdal county, Norway. It is located 1.5 kilometres (0.93 mi) northeast of the island of Harøya. The 0.6-square-kilometre (150-acre) island of Finnøya is connected by a causeway to the neighboring island of Harøya, and it has ferry connections to the nearby islands of Sandøya and Orta (in Aukra Municipality).

== See also ==
- List of islands of Norway
