= Harøya =

Island in Møre og Romsdal county, Norway

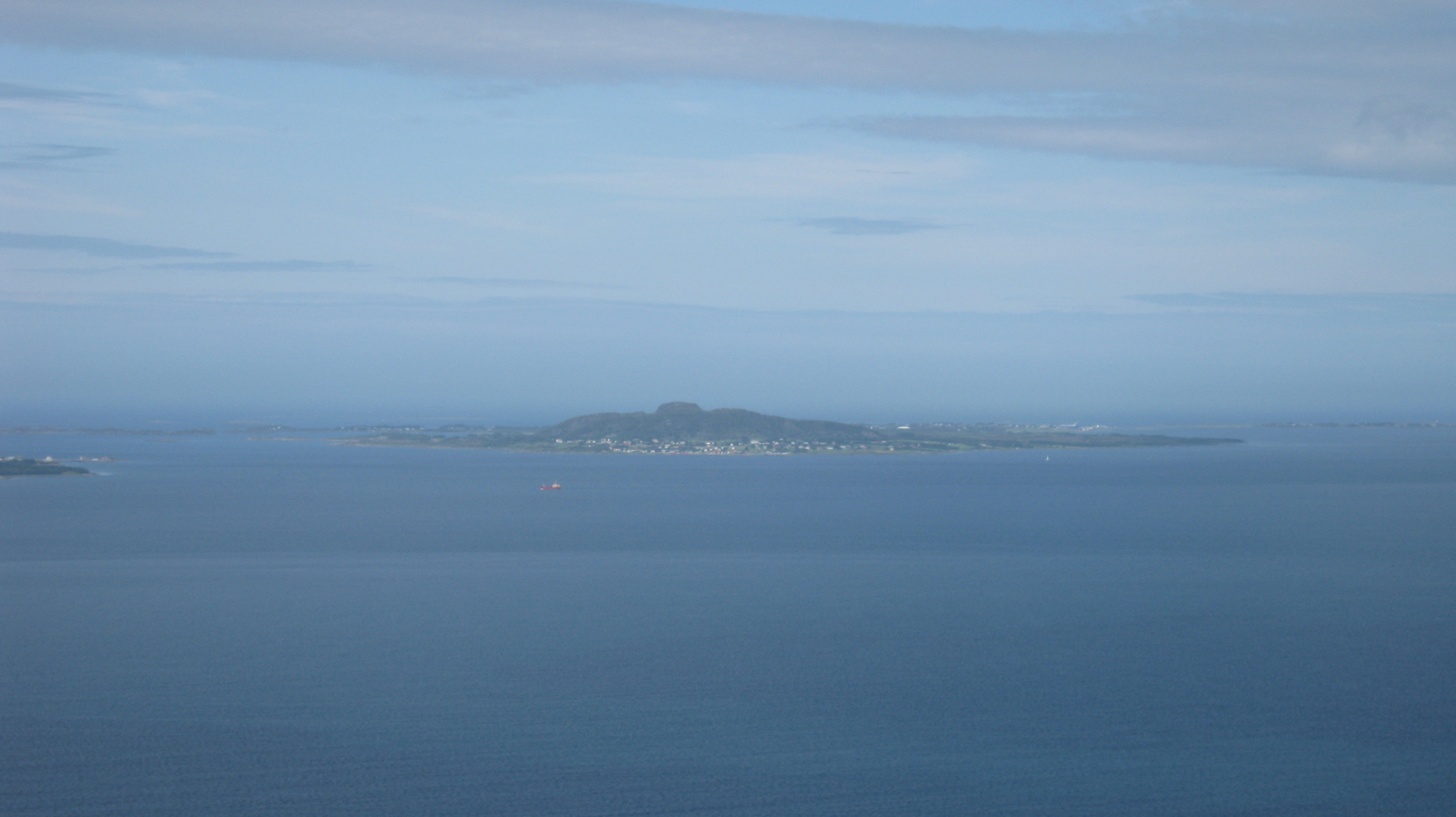
- View of Harøya (looking north)
- Interactive map of Harøya

Geography
- Location: Møre og Romsdal, Norway
- Coordinates: 62.7697°N 06.4415°E
- Area: 13.6 km^{2} (5.3 sq mi)
- Length: 7 km (4.3 mi)
- Width: 3 km (1.9 mi)
- Highest elevation: 156 m (512 ft)
- Highest point: Harøyburet

Administration
- Norway
- County: Møre og Romsdal
- Municipality: Ålesund Municipality

Ramsar Wetland
- Official name: Harøya Wetlands System
- Designated: 18 March 1996
- Reference no.: 806

Harøya is a swampy island in Ålesund Municipality in Møre og Romsdal county, Norway. At 13.6 square kilometres (5.3 sq mi), it is the largest island in the municipality. The island is located between the islands of Finnøya (to the northeast) and Fjørtofta (to the southwest).

Steinshamn, the municipal center, is located at the north end of the island where there is a causeway connecting it to the neighboring island of Finnøya. The village of Myklebost is located at the south end of the island, where there are ferry connections to the island of Dryna (in Molde Municipality) and to the mainland village of Brattvåg and the island of Fjørtofta (both in Haram Municipality). Harøy Church is located in the center of the island, just north of the Lomstjønna Nature Reserve.

The new Nordøyvegen bridge and tunnel project connects the island of Harøya to the mainland via a series of bridges and undersea tunnels.

== See also ==
- List of islands of Norway
