= Inception of Darwin's theory =

History of the evolutionary theory

The inception of Darwin's theory occurred during an intensively busy period which began when Charles Darwin returned from the survey voyage of the Beagle, with his reputation as a fossil collector and geologist already established. He was given an allowance from his father to become a gentleman naturalist rather than a clergyman, and his first tasks were to find suitable experts to describe his collections, write out his Journal and Remarks, and present papers on his findings to the Geological Society of London.

At Darwin's geological début, the anatomist Richard Owen's reports on the fossils showed that extinct species were related to current species in the same locality, and the ornithologist John Gould showed that bird specimens from the Galápagos Islands were of distinct species related to places, not just varieties. These points convinced Darwin that transmutation of species must be occurring, and in his Red Notebook he jotted down his first evolutionary ideas. He began specific transmutation notebooks with speculations on variation in offspring "to adapt & alter the race to changing world", and sketched an "irregularly branched" genealogical branching of a single evolutionary tree.

Animal observations of an orangutan at the zoo showed how human its expressions looked, confirming his thoughts from the Beagle voyage that there was little gulf between man and animals. He investigated animal breeding and found parallels to nature removing runts and keeping the fit, with farmers deliberately selecting breeding animals so that through "a thousand intermediate forms" their descendants were significantly changed. His speculations on instincts and mental traits suggested habits, beliefs and facial expressions having evolved, and considered the social implications. While this was his "prime hobby", he was struggling with an immense workload and began suffering from his illness. Having taken a break from work, his thoughts of marriage turned to his cousin Emma Wedgwood.

Reading about Malthus and natural law led him to apply to his search the Malthusian logic of social thinking of struggle for survival with no handouts, and he "had at last got a theory by which to work". He proposed to Emma and was accepted. In his theory, he compared breeders selecting traits to natural selection from variants thrown up by "chance", and continued to look to the countryside for supporting information. On 24 January 1839 he was elected as Fellow of the Royal Society, and on the 29th married Emma. The development of Darwin's theory followed.

== Background ==
Darwin was not the first to propose that species of organisms could become modified over time. In the third edition of On the Origin of Species Darwin provided a historical sketch of his predecessors in writing of descent with modification or natural selection, including those whom he had only learned of after the 1859 publication of The Origin. His account essentially deals with 19th-century authors; "Passing over authors from the classical period to that of Buffon, with whose writings I am not familiar, Lamarck was the first man whose conclusions on this subject excited much attention." However, in a footnote he remarks on how his grandfather, Dr. Erasmus Darwin, Goethe and Geoffroy Saint Hilaire came to the same conclusion on the origin of species in the years 1794–95, anticipating Lamarck.

After his early life in a Unitarian family, Charles Darwin developed his interest in natural history. At Edinburgh University his work as a student of Robert Edmund Grant involved him in pioneering investigations of the ideas of Lamarck and Erasmus Darwin on homology showing common descent, but he also saw how controversial and troubling such theories were. Robert Jameson's course taught Darwin stratigraphic geology, and closed with lectures on the "Origin of the Species of Animals". At Christ's College, Cambridge to qualify as an Anglican clergyman, Darwin became passionate about beetle collecting, then shone in John Stevens Henslow's botany course. He was convinced by Paley's Natural Theology which set out the Teleological argument that complexity of "design" in nature proved God's role as Creator, and by the views of Paley and John Herschel that creation was by laws which science could discover, not by intermittent miracles. The geology course of Adam Sedgwick and summer work mapping strata in Wales emphasised that life on earth went back over eons of time.

Then on his voyage on the Beagle Darwin became convinced by Charles Lyell's uniformitarian theory of gradual geological process (see Lyell's Principles of Geology, which Darwin took along on the Beagle), and puzzled over how various theories of creation fitted the evidence he saw. However, Darwin did not conceive the theory of evolution during the Beagle's voyage, later recounting that:

it was equally evident that neither the action of the surrounding conditions, nor the will of the organisms (especially in the case of plants), could account for the innumerable cases in which organisms of every kind are beautifully adapted to their habitats of life—for instance, a woodpecker or a tree-frog to climb trees, or a seed for dispersal by hooks or plumes. I had always been much struck by such adaptations, and until these could be explained it seemed to me almost useless to endeavour to prove by indirect evidence that species have been modified.

== Return to England ==
When Beagle returned, it anchored at Falmouth, Cornwall, on 2 October 1836. That same stormy night, Darwin set off on the mail coach for two days' travel to his family home – The Mount House in Shrewsbury, Shropshire. He arrived late at night on 4 October. and having taken the coach for his last visit, had thought he might sleep at the Lion coaching inn rather disturb them "in the dead of the night". He greeted his family at breakfast in the morning, and began catching up with news of his family and of the country: "all England appears changed". The Reform Bill had brought what the Tory Duke of Wellington described as a shift in power from decent Tory Anglicans to Whig manufacturers, shopkeepers and atheists. Educated people were discussing the writings of Thomas Malthus on population outstripping resources as the New Poor Law, described by opponents as "a Malthusian bill designed to force the poor to emigrate, to work for lower wages, to live on a coarser sort of food", brought the construction of workhouses in the southern counties despite riots and arson. The government had not yet dared introduce these measures to London and the industrial north, and recession was bringing threats of mass unemployment.

Darwin wrote to Henslow that he was still "giddy with joy & confusion... I want your advice on so many points, indeed I am in the clouds" and on 15 October went on to Cambridge to get advice from Henslow and Sedgwick on the task of organising the description and cataloguing of his collections accumulated from the Beagle expedition. Henslow took on the plants, and Darwin was given introductions to the best London naturalists with a warning that they would already be busy with other work.

Charles went on to stay with his brother Erasmus in London, near the scientific institutions which were in the throes of renovation, while the city itself was being torn up to install new sewers and gas lighting. He went round the British Museum, the Royal College of Surgeons, the Linnean, the Zoological Society and Geological Society, trying to get the experts to take on his collections. Henslow had already established his former pupil's reputation during the Beagle expedition by giving selected naturalists access to fossil specimens sent back, as well as reading out Extracts from Letters to Henslow to the Cambridge Philosophical Society, which had them privately printed for distribution, while Darwin's geological notes from the letters were summarised by Sedgwick at the Geological Society, and extracts appeared in magazines. Darwin went "in most exciting dissipation amongst the Dons in science", and as Charles Bunbury reported, "[he] seems to be a universal collector" finding new species "to the surprise of all the big wigs". While geologists were quick to take on the rock samples, zoologists already had more specimens arriving than they could deal with. Their institutions were in turmoil as democrats argued for reforms replacing the aristocratic amateurs with professional salaried scientists as in the French research institutes. At the Zoological Society the reformers were led by Darwin's tutor from Edinburgh days, Robert Edmund Grant. Darwin now had an allowance plus stocks from his father, bringing him around £400 per year, and his sympathies were with the amateur clerical "Dons in science" of Cambridge.

=== Owen and fossils ===
The geologist Charles Lyell invited Darwin to dinner on 29 October 1836. Over dinner Lyell listened eagerly to Darwin's stories (which supported Lyell's uniformitarianism) and introduced him to Richard Owen and William Broderip, Tories who had just been involved in voting Grant out of a position at the Zoological Society. Owen was rapidly ousting Grant as the country's leading anatomist. Darwin went to visit him at his Royal College of Surgeons, and Owen agreed to work on some animal specimens in spirits and the fossil bones. Owen shared Darwin's enthusiasm. He was a proponent of German ideas of "organising energy" and vehemently opposed to Grant's evolution. At around this time Grant was one of the few to volunteer his help with cataloguing the collection. Darwin turned down the offer, not wanting to be associated with a disreputable radical who denounced his Cambridge friends.

On 12 November Darwin visited his Wedgwood relatives at Maer Hall, and they encouraged him to publish a book of his travels based on his diary, an idea his sisters picked up when he visited his home.

On 2 December he returned to London and began finding takers for his specimens, with Thomas Bell and the Revd. William Buckland interested in the reptiles. Darwin's reputation was being made by the giant mammal fossils. Owen's first surprising revelation was that a hippopotamus-sized fossil skull 2 feet 4 inches (710 mm) long which Darwin had bought for about two shillings near Mercedes while on a "galloping" trip 120 miles (190 km) from Montevideo was of an extinct rodent-like creature resembling a giant capybara, which Owen named Toxodon. Darwin wrote to his sister Caroline that "[the fossils] are turning out great treasures" and of the Toxodon, "There is another head, as large as a Rhinoceros which as far as they can guess, must have been a gnawing animal. Conceive a Rat or a Hare of such a size – What famous Cats they ought to have had in those days!" The College of Surgeons distributed casts of the fossils to the major scientific institutions.

Darwin paid a visit to his brother Erasmus's lady friend the literary Whig Miss Harriet Martineau who had strong views on egalitarianism and whose writings had popularised the ideas of Thomas Malthus. Around this time, she was writing her Society in America which included discussion of the geological "process of world making" that she had seen on her visit to the Niagara Falls. He sat there for almost an hour. "She was very agreeable and managed to talk on a most wonderful number of subjects, considering the limited time. I was astonished to find how little ugly she is, but as it appears to me, she is overwhelmed with her own projects, her own thoughts and own abilities. Erasmus palliated all this, by maintaining one ought not to look at her as a woman." Charles Darwin wrote in one of his notebooks that he read her book on How to Observe Morals and Manners during the first half of August 1838. He was inspired by Martineau's cultural relativism to conclude that morality can not only be influenced by culture, but also can be a social instinct that is shaped by heredity: "This probably is natural consequence of man, like deer, etc., being social animal, & this conscience or instinct may be most firmly fixed, but it will not prevent others being engrafted." In her autobiography, she later recalled Charles as being "simple, childlike, painstaking, effective".

=== Geological début, species related to places ===
Unhappy with life in a "dirty odious London" he returned to Cambridge on 13 December then wrote his first paper, showing that the Chilean coast and the South American land-mass was rising slowly, and discussed his ideas with Lyell. To Lyell's delight, Darwin went further in balancing the rising continent with sinking mountains forming the basis of coral atolls. Moreover, according to contemporaneous entries in Darwin's notebooks, he had discussions with Lyell about the latter's manuscript, Elements of Geology, which was subsequently to be published (in 1838). Lyell's geological findings, including his estimation of the age of the Earth, proved to be useful to Darwin, as he was formulating his ideas about the transmutation of species.

Darwin briefly returned to London to present a paper to the Geological Society on 4 January 1837. Despite Darwin's nerves about his début, the talk was so well received that he felt "like a peacock admiring his tail". On the same day, Darwin presented 80 mammal and 450 bird specimens to the Zoological Society. The Mammalia were ably taken on by George R. Waterhouse.

While the birds seemed almost an afterthought the ornithologist John Gould took them on and was quick to notice the significance of specimens from the Galápagos Islands. He startlingly revealed at the next meeting on 10 January that what Darwin had taken to be wrens, blackbirds and slightly differing finches were "a series of ground finches which are so peculiar" as to form "an entirely new group" of 11 species. The story of what we now call "Darwin's finches" was covered by the daily newspapers, though Darwin was in Cambridge and did not get details at this stage. In the minutes of the meeting the number was extended to 12 species.

Owen was finding unexpected relationships from the fossils: the batch included the horse sized Scelidotherium which appeared to be closely allied to the anteater, a gigantic ground sloth, and an ox-sized armoured armadillo which he called Glyptodon. The Patagonian spine and leg bones from Port St Julian which Darwin had thought might be from a Mastodon were apparently from a gigantic guanaco or Llama, or perhaps camel, which Owen named Macrauchenia. Lyell saw a "law of succession" with mammals being replaced by their own kind on each continent, and on 17 February used his presidential address at the Geological Society to present Owen's findings to date on Darwin's fossils, pointing out this inference that extinct species were related to current species in the same locality. He invited Darwin to come along, and the speech drew Darwin's attention to the question of why past and present species in one place should be so closely related. At the same meeting Darwin was elected to the council of the society. For Lyell this was "a glorious addition to my society of geologists", gentlemen (and amateurs of independent means) with duty only to scientific integrity, social stability and responsible religion; for Darwin it meant joining the respectable élite of eminent geologists developing a science dealing with the age of the Earth and the Days of Creation.

Darwin had already been invited by FitzRoy to contribute his Journal, based on his field notes, as the natural history section of the captain's account of the Beagle's voyage, and this ended up keeping him fully occupied from 13 March to the end of September. He also plunged into writing a book on South American Geology, putting his and Lyell's ideas forward against the cataclysmic explanation of mountain formation Alcide d'Orbigny was promoting in a multi-volume account of the continent begun two years previously.

On Monday 27 February Darwin presented a talk to the Cambridge Philosophical Society on glassy tubes he had found amongst Maldonado sand dunes, explained by lightning having fused the sand.

To supervise his collections Darwin had to return to London, and on Lyell's advice he planned to arrive on Friday 3 March 1837, in time for one of Charles Babbage's Saturday parties, talking shops about the latest developments "brilliantly attended by fashionable ladies, as well as literary and scientific gents" and "a good mixture of pretty women", bankers and politicians, where Babbage promoted such projects as his mechanical computer. At first Darwin stayed with Erasmus, in his journal (written up later) he put his date of moving as 6 March 1837. On the 13th he moved to nearby lodgings, joining Erasmus's circle of friends including Martineau and Hensleigh and enjoying his intimate dinner parties with guests such as Lyell, Babbage and Thomas Carlyle.

In their first meeting to discuss his detailed findings, Gould told Darwin that the Galápagos mockingbirds from different islands were separate species, not just varieties, and the finch group included the "wrens". The two rheas were also distinct species, and on 14 March Gould's announcement of this finding to the Zoological Society of London was accompanied by Darwin, who presented a paper on how distribution of the two species of rheas changed going southwards.

== Transmutation ==
=== Context ===
Darwin was concerned to make sure that his theorising, whether published or private, fully complied with the accepted scientific methodology of his peers. In the scientific societies and at informal dinners he discussed methods with two leading authorities on the topic, John Herschel and William Whewell.

Scientific circles were buzzing with ideas of natural theology. In a letter to Lyell, Herschel had written of "that mystery of mysteries, the replacement of extinct species by others". This was circulated and widely discussed, with scientists sharing Herschel's approach of looking for an answer through laws of nature and rejecting ad hoc miracles as an explanation. Charles Babbage expressed in his Ninth Bridgewater Treatise (1837) a view of "Nature's God" along the lines of a programmer of such laws. Darwin's freethinking brother Erasmus was part of this Whig circle and a close friend of the writer Harriet Martineau, who promoted the Malthusianism underlying the controversial Whig Poor Law reforms (1834) to stop welfare from causing overpopulation and more poverty, which were then being implemented piecemeal in the face of opposition to the new poorhouses. As a Unitarian, Martineau welcomed the radical implications of transmutation of species, which was promoted by Grant and some medical men but anathema to Darwin's Anglican friends who saw it as a threat to the social order. Transmutation threatened the essential distinction between man and beast, and implied progressive improvement with the implication that the lower orders could aspire to the privileges of their aristocratic overlords.

The medical establishment controlling the London teaching hospitals, including the Royal College of Surgeons, was restricted to Anglicans and dominated by the aristocracy who saw perfect animal design as proof of a natural theology supporting their ideas of God-given rank and privilege. Since the 1820s large numbers of private medical schools joined by the new London University had introduced the "philosophical anatomy" of Geoffroy Saint-Hilaire based on unity of plan compatible with the transmutation of species, implying ideas of progressive improvement and supporting radical demands for democracy. This anatomy had already spread from Paris to the medical schools of Edinburgh, and the new London schools attracted Scots, including Grant. Numerous journals now promoted these radical ideas, including Thomas Wakley's The Lancet (started in 1823 with support from William Cobbett and William Lawrence, whose 1819 publication of evolutionary ideas the Crown had prosecuted for blasphemy). In response, the medical establishment gave support to the idealist biology of Joseph Henry Green (1791–1863) and of his younger protégé Richard Owen (1804–1892), based on the vitalism of German Naturphilosophie and Platonic idealism, which saw anatomical forms as "archetypes" in the Divine mind, imposed through "descensive" powers of delegation of divine authority in accordance with traditional hierarchies.

=== Red Notebook ===
In 1836 Darwin used his Red Notebook to record field observations during the last stages of his Beagle voyage, from May to 25 September. Page 113 mentions a meeting with Richard Owen, after the ship's return to England in October. Later notes mention discussions with other experts, including the geographer Sir Woodbine Parish, geologists Charles Lyell and Roderick Murchison, and the conchologist James De Carle Sowerby. Darwin also took brief notes on what he was reading, reminders on planned publications including his Journal of the voyage, and his developing "theories", "conjectures", and "hypotheses". He continued using the notebook until May or June 1837.

In his later "Journal", Darwin recalled having been "greatly struck from about month of previous March on character of S. American fossils – & species on Galapagos Archipelago. – These facts origin (especially latter) of all my views." His first reference to transmutation appears in the Red Notebook around early March 1837, after John Gould told him that the common Rhea was a different species to the Petisse. Darwin wrote "Speculate on neutral ground of 2 ostriches; bigger one encroaches on smaller. change not progressif<e>: produced at one blow. if one species altered", proposing a sudden change or saltation in contrast to Lamarck's idea that species graded imperceptibly into each other: later, Darwin referred to this jump as inosculation. He drew on the relationship Owen had shown between fossils of the extinct giant Macrauchenia and the modern guanacos that Darwin had hunted in Patagonia: "The same kind of relation that common ostrich bears to [Petisse]: extinct Guanaco to recent: in former case position, in latter time. .... – As in first cases distinct species inosculate, so must we believe ancient ones: not gradual change or degeneration. from circumstances: if one species does change into another it must be per saltum – or species may perish." Here, he related the geographical distribution of species to their replacement over time, and tentatively proposed that the Rheas had a shared ancestor.

He noted his thoughts on reproduction and extinction; "Tempted to believe animals created for a definite time: – not extinguished by change of circumstances", and various domesticated animals had "all run wild & bred. no doubt with perfect success. – showing non-Creation does not bear upon solely adaptation of animals. – extinction in same manner may not depend. – There is no more wonder in extinction of species than of individual."

Darwin's notes mention several papers based on his geological writings during the voyage. At the Geographical Society meeting on 3 May 1837, Darwin read his paper on strata around Río de la Plata where he had found fossils including the Toxodon. At the same meeting, announcements were made of the first discoveries of ancient fossil primates; finds by Proby Cautley and Hugh Falconer in Neogene strata of the Sivalik Hills, and by Édouard Lartet in Miocene beds at Sansan, Gers. Later, Lyell joked uncomfortably to his sister that "according to Lamarck's view, there may have been a great many thousand centuries for their tails to wear off, and the transformation to men to take place", but Darwin was beginning to look at these "wonderful" fossils in relation to transmutation. Darwin's notes mentioned his "Coral Paper" which he had originally drafted in 1835; he presented this on 31 May 1837 at the Geological Society of London, and later used it as the basis for his book on The Structure and Distribution of Coral Reefs.

At their frequent meetings, Owen argued that intrinsic "organising energy" in the "embryonic germ" set the lifespan of the species and precluded transmutation. The botanist Robert Brown showed Darwin a different concept, of "swarming atoms" inside the germ, allowing nature's self-development. Embarrassed by his lack of labels for his finch specimens, he examined FitzRoy's in the British Museum and contacted seamen including Syms Covington for their collections. From this he was able to relate the finches to separate islands, with distinct species on each island. As well as pressing on with his Journal, he started an ambitious project to get the expert reports on his collection published as a multi-volume Zoology of the Voyage of H.M.S. Beagle. A search for sponsorship was answered when Henslow used his contacts with the Chancellor of the Exchequer Thomas Spring Rice to arrange a Treasury grant of £1,000, a sum equivalent to about £97,000 in present-day terms.

During the Beagle voyage Darwin had noted the distribution of the two species of Galápagos iguanas and suspected that "this genus, the species of which are so well adapted to their respective localities, is peculiar to this group of Isds". He had identified the sea iguanas from a book on board as having been named Amblyrhyncus Cristatus by Bell from a specimen which had arrived in Mexico, probably found on the Pacific shore. In June he gave this information to William Buckland. As the Victorian era began, Darwin pressed on with writing his Journal, and in August 1837 began correcting printer's proofs.

== Transmutation notebooks ==
In mid-July 1837, as his Red Notebook filled up, Darwin reorganised his note-taking, and began two new notebooks: his "A" notebook on geology, and his "B" notebook, the first of a series on "transmutation of Species", in which he scribbled down a framework for his speculations, jotting down thoughts on evolution. In a phrase he used later, this became "mental rioting".

=== B notebook ===
The title page of the "B" notebook was headed Zoönomia, referring to his late grandfather's evolutionary ideas, and began with questions about the reasons for "generation" in which asexual reproduction resulted in copies of the original, while sexual reproduction produced variation in the offspring, and organisms had short lifespans. The world was known to have changed over time, and "the young of living beings, become permanently changed or subject to variety, according to circumstances". This included plants, animals, and humanity: "in course of generations even mind and instinct become influenced. – child of savage not civilized man." Full-grown organisms might be unchangeable, but variability of their offspring would "adapt & alter the race to changing world." His ideas predated genetic concepts, and he continued to believe that variations arose through reproduction in a purposeful way responding to changes in the environment. Not all would succeed: "The father being climatized, climatizes the child. Whether every animal produces in course of ages ten thousand varieties (influenced itself perhaps by circumstances) & those alone preserved which are well adapted."

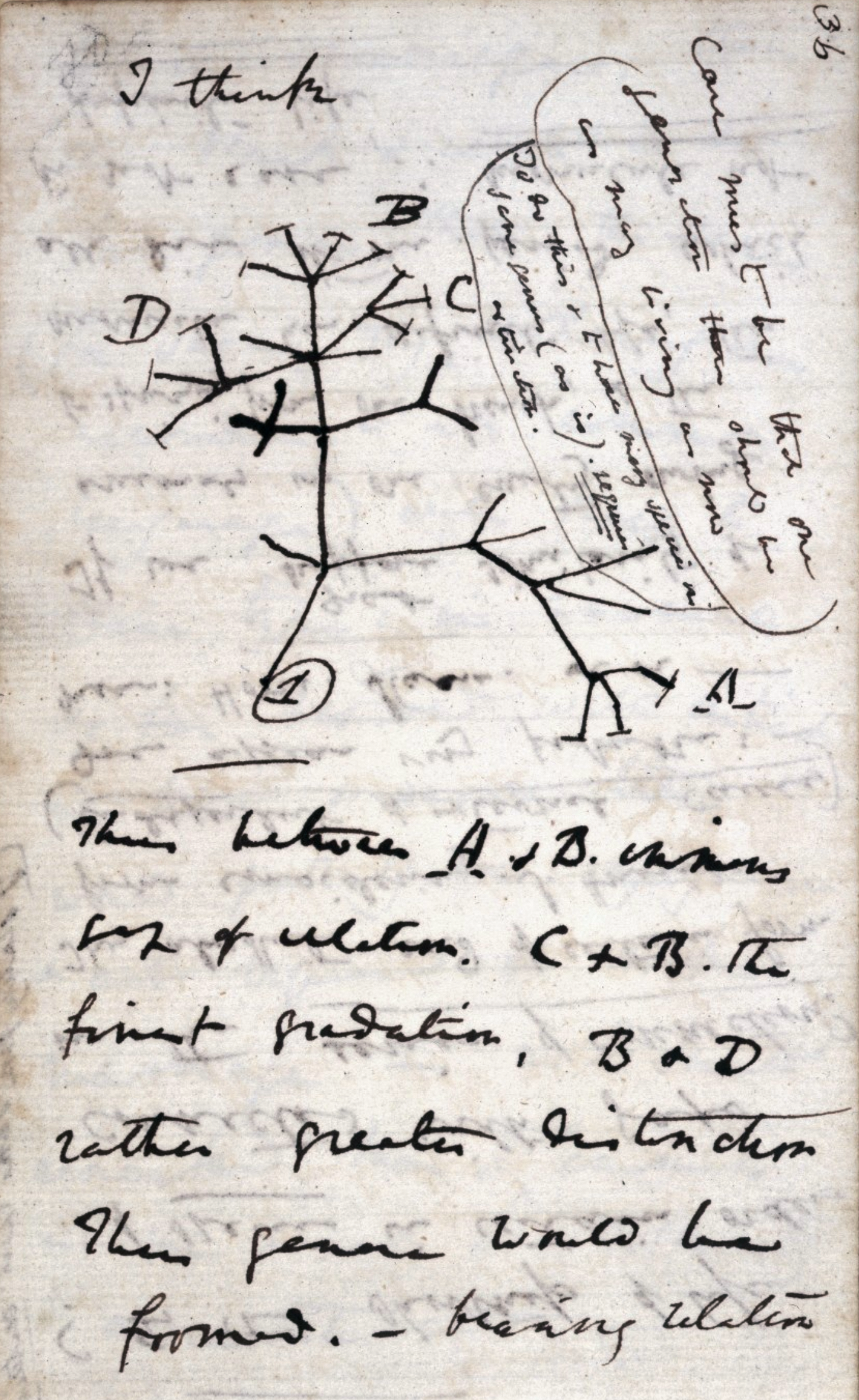
In mid-July 1837 Darwin started his "B" notebook on Transmutation of Species, and quickly developed unique ideas of branching descent. On page 36 wrote "I think" above his first evolutionary tree diagram.

In a large population, "intermarriages" (crossing) would even out these variations and explain why species appeared constant, but reproductive isolation of a small sub-group could lead to divergence and geographic speciation: "animals on separate islands ought to become different if kept long enough apart with slightly differing circumstances", as in the various species he had seen of Galápagos tortoises and mockingbirds, the Falkland Fox and the Chiloe fox, the "Inglish and Irish Hare". What Darwin called "inosculation" would abruptly introduce a clear distinction between even the most closely related species, explaining the rheas which remained distinct species with overlapping territories.

Uniquely for his time, he envisaged this diverging adaptation as genealogical branching from a common ancestor, an evolutionary tree: "Organized beings represent a tree irregularly branched some branches far more branched – Hence Genera. – ) As many terminal buds dying as new ones generated". Refining the concept, he proposed a coral of life; "The tree of life should perhaps be called the coral of life, base of branches dead; so that passages cannot be seen". With the words "I think", he sketched a diagram of this branching pattern. This novel view contrasted with the ideas of transmutationists of the time (including Lamarck and Grant), who envisaged independent parallel lineages impelled by inner forces to make progress to higher forms. Darwin protested against these linear ideas of progress; "It is absurd to talk of one animal being higher than another. – We consider those, when the intellectual faculties [or] cerebral structure most developed, as highest. – A bee doubtless would when the instincts were". Later in the notebook, he set down a progressionist concept of human origins: "If all men were dead, then monkeys make men. – Men make angels".

Darwin thought that the possibility of a common ancestor of "mammalia & fish" could not be ruled out when such strange forms as the platypus existed. The unique plants and animals on the Galápagos islands sharing features with mainland American species, while wandering birds such as sandpipers were unchanged, showed the way "creative power acted at Galapagos", confirmed "if we believe the Creator created by any laws, which I think is shown by the very facts of the Zoological character of these islands". A similar relationship in time was shown by the extinct armoured giant Glyptodon resembling the modern South American armadillo. He considered that the way that astronomers once thought that God ordered the movement of individual planets was comparable to individual creation of species in particular countries, but divine powers were "much more simple & sublime" in creating the first animals so that species then arose by "the fixed laws of generation". A hypothesis of "fresh creations" he saw as "mere assumption, it explains nothing further". From Owen, he learnt of John Hunter's observations on "the production of monsters" (mutants) at birth, and he noted that this could "present an analogy to production of species". He jotted down thoughts on how organisms could reach new islands: could "Owls transport mice alive?". Seeds might be blown over, transported by floating trees or eaten by birds which flew to the islands. He noted a reminder to "Experimentise on land shells in salt water & lizards" ditto.

Under pressure with organising Zoology and correcting proofs of his Journal (which had to have the introduction revised when FitzRoy complained that he was "astonished at the total omission of any notice of the officers" for their help), Darwin's health suffered. On 20 September 1837 he suffered "an uncomfortable palpitation of the heart". His doctors advised him "strongly to knock off all work" and to leave for the country. Two days later he went to Maer Hall, the Wedgwoods' home, for a month of recuperation. His relations wore him out with questions about gaucho life. His invalid aunt was being cared for by the as-yet unmarried Emma, and his uncle Jos pointed out an area of ground where cinders had disappeared under loam which Jos though might have been the work of earthworms. Darwin returned to London on 21 October and on 1 November gave a talk on the role of earthworms in soil formation to the Geological Society, a mundane subject which to them may have seemed eccentric. William Buckland subsequently recommended Darwin's paper for publication, praising it as "a new & important theory to explain Phenomena of universal occurrence on the surface of the Earth – in fact a new Geological Power", while rightly rejecting Darwin's suggestion that chalkland could have been formed in a similar way.

Darwin had avoided taking on official posts which would take valuable time, turning down William Whewell's request that he become secretary of the Geological Society with excuses including "anything which flurries me completely knocks me up afterwards and brings on a bad palpitation of the heart", but in January 1838 he accepted the post. On 7 March he read to the society his longest paper yet, which explained the earthquake he had witnessed at Concepción, Chile, in terms of gradual crustal movements, to the delight of Lyell. Despite hours of practice, as he later recalled; "I was so nervous at first, I somehow could see nothing all around me, & felt as if my body was gone, & only my head left".

At the same time, Darwin pondered likely opposition to his ideas. Sure that there must have been "a thousand intermediate forms" between the modern otter and its land-only ancestor, he thought. "Opponent will say. show them me. I will answer yes, if you will show me every step between bull Dog & Greyhound". He privately scorned Whewell's faith in a human-centred universe, perfectly adapted to man, and wrote that "My theory would give zest to recent & fossil Comparative Anatomy, it would lead to study of instincts, heredity & mind heredity, whole metaphysics". Contrary to the views of his Cambridge professors that humans were "godlike", around February 1838 Darwin wrote in his B notebook; "Animals whom we have made our slaves we do not like to consider our equals. – Do not slave holders wish to make the black man other kind – animals with affections, imitation, fear of death, pain, sorrow for the dead. – respect." The expectation of finding "the father of mankind" was comparable to finding Macrauchenia, and "if we choose to let conjecture run wild then our animals our fellow brethern in pain, disease, death & suffering, & famine, our slaves in the most laborious works, our companions in our amusements. they may partake from our origin in one common ancestor; we may be all netted together."

=== C notebook: animal observations ===
By February 1838 Darwin was on to a new pocketbook, the maroon C notebook, and was investigating the breeding of domestic animals. He found the newspaper wholesaler William Yarrell at the Zoological museum a fund of knowledge, and questioned if breeders weren't going against nature in "picking varieties". He was now writing of "Descent" rather than transmutation, and hinting at ideas of "adaptation" to climate.

At the zoo on 28 March he had his first sight of an ape, and was impressed at the orang-utan's antics "just like a naughty child" when the keeper held back an apple. In his notes he wrote "Let man visit Ourang-outang in domestication, hear expressive whine, see its intelligence.... let him look at savage...naked, artless, not improving yet improvable & let him dare to boast of his proud preeminence." Here Darwin was drawing on his experience of the natives of Tierra del Fuego and daring to think that there was little gulf between man and animals despite the theological doctrine that only humanity possessed a soul.

On 1 April Charles wrote to his older sister Susan that he had also seen the rhinoceros in the zoo let out for the first time that spring, "kicking & rearing" and galloping for joy. He then passed on the gossip that Miss Martineau had been "as frisky lately [as] the Rhinoceros. – Erasmus has been with her noon, morning, and night: – if her character was not as secure, as a mountain in the polar regions she certainly would loose it. – Lyell called there the other day & there was a beautiful rose on the table, & she coolly showed it to him & said "Erasmus Darwin" gave me that. – How fortunate it is, she is so very plain; otherwise I should be frightened: She is a wonderful woman". He began thinking about marriage himself, and on the back of an old letter (dated 7 April 1838) he listed the pros and cons of London, Cambridge or the countryside, noting that "I have so much more pleasure in direct observation, that I could not go on as Lyell does, correcting & adding up new information to old train & I do not see what line can be followed by man tied down to London. – In country, experiment & observations on lower animals. – more space – ". In an 8 May letter to his Cambridge friend Charles Thomas Whitley, who had recently married, Darwin described himself as having "turned a complete scribbler", and said "Of the future I know nothing I never look further ahead than two or three Chapters – for my life is now measured by volume, chapters & sheets & has little to do with the sun – As for a wife, that most interesting specimen in the whole series of vertebrate animals, Providence only know whether I shall ever capture one or be able to feed her if caught."

Darwin found a pamphlet by Yarrell's friend Sir John Sebright, with a passage reading:

A severe winter, or a scarcity of food, by destroying the weak and the unhealthy, has all the good effects of the most skilful selection. In cold or barren countries no animals can live to the age of maturity, but those who have strong constitutions; the weak and the unhealthy do not live to propagate their infirmities.

Sebright said females went to "the most vigorous males", and "the strongest individuals of both sexes, by driving away the weakest, will enjoy the best food, and the most favourable positions, for themselves and their offspring." After reading the pamphlet, Darwin commented "excellent observations of sickly offspring being cut off so that not propagated by nature. – Whole art of making varieties may be inferred from facts stated".

==== Speculations ====
Darwin's speculations in his notebooks deepened as he wondered how instincts and mental traits were passed on to offspring; "Thought (or desires more properly) being hereditary it is difficult to imagine it anything but structure of brain hereditary, analogy points out to this. – love of the deity effect of organization, oh you materialist!", and reminded himself to read Barclay "on organization!!" He struggled on with the Beagle geology, overworked, worried and suffering stomach upsets and headaches which laid him up for days on end. Privately he thought of the social implications of evolution, writing "Educate all classes. avoid the contamination of castes, improve the women (double influence) & mankind must improve." This was similar to the position of the radical Lamarckians, but female education was already supported by the whole Wedgwood-Darwin family, and strongly advocated by Martineau.

Darwin wrote "Man in his arrogance thinks himself a great work worthy the interposition of a deity, more humble & I believe truer to consider him created from animals." In an early precursor of his work on The Expression of the Emotions in Man and Animals, Darwin turned round the theological idea of Charles Bell that humans were designed to expose their canine teeth when grinning, and explained the expression by shared descent: "no doubt a habit gained by formerly being a baboon with great canine teeth. – Blend this argument with his having canine teeth at all. – This way of viewing the subject important. Laughing modified barking, smiling modified laughing. Barking to tell other animals in associated kinds of good news, discovery of prey, arising no doubt from want of assistance. – crying is a puzzler. – Under this point of view expression of all animals becomes very curious – a dog snarling in play." Darwin had privately talked with his cousin "Hensleigh Wedgwood about the relationship of humans to animals; "Hensleigh says the love of the deity & thought of him or eternity only difference between the mind of man & animals. – yet how faint in a Fuegian or Australian!" Darwin's own experience with "savages" he had met on the Beagle expedition showed that not all humans shared these religious beliefs.

As he worried at these ideas and the Geology his illness intensified, with stomach upsets, headaches and heart troubles, so that he became overworked and laid up for days on end. In May he wrote to his sister Caroline Wedgwood hoping to visit his relatives in July or early August, "but I shall be cruelly hurried – as I have to go to Scotland for Geological work" and also had to be in London every second month for the publication of his Zoology. "I hope I may be able to work on right hard during the next three years, otherwise I shall never have finished, – but I find the noddle & the stomach are antagonist powers, and that it is a great deal more easy to think too much in a day, than to think too little – What thought has to do with digesting roast beef, – I cannot say, but they are brother faculties." Darwin's cousin William Darwin Fox gave helpful answers to his questions about crossing domestic breeds, and in his reply of 15 June, Darwin admitted for the first time that "It is my prime hobby & I really think some day, I shall be able to do something on that most intricate subject species & varieties."

At the same time Darwin was gaining public position, and on 21 June 1838 was elected to the establishment Athenæum Club, along with Charles Dickens. From the start of August, Darwin began going there each day to "dine at the Athenæum like a gentleman, or rather like a Lord, for I am sure the first evening I sat in that great drawing room, all on a sofa by myself, I felt just like a duke. – I am full of admiration at the Athenæum; one meets so many people there, that one likes to see. ... I enjoy it the more, because I fully expected to detest it."

== Thoughts of marriage ==
The Hensleigh Wedgwoods were now living next door to Erasmus. In early June 1838 they were visited for a week by Catherine Darwin and Emma Wedgwood, returning from a family get-together in Paris. As Emma told her aunt a few weeks later, "Charles used to come from next door, so we were a very pleasant, merry party."

Illness prompted Darwin to take a break from the pressure of work: on 15 June he told his cousin William Darwin Fox; "I have not been very well of late, which has suddenly determined me to leave London earlier than I had anticipated. I go by the steam-packet to Edinburgh. – take a solitary walk on Salisbury crags & call up old thoughts of former times then go on to Glasgow & the great valley of Inverness, – near which I intend stopping a week to geologise the parallel roads of Glen Roy, – thence to Shrewsbury, Maer for one day, & London for smoke, ill health & hard work." On 23 June 1838 he took the steamboat to Edinburgh to go "geologising" in Scotland. After revisiting Edinburgh on 28 June (the day that Queen Victoria had her coronation in London) he went on to Fort William. At Glen Roy in glorious weather he was convinced that he had solved the riddle of the "parallel roads" around the glen, which he identified as raised beaches, though later geologists would support the ideas of Louis Agassiz that these had been formed by glaciation.

Fully recuperated and optimistic, he returned home to The Mount, Shrewsbury. He discussed his ideas with his father and asked for advice about Emma. Speaking from experience, Doctor Robert Waring Darwin told his son to conceal religious doubts which could cause "extreme misery... Things went on pretty well until the husband or wife became out of health, and then some women suffered miserably by doubting about the salvation of their husbands, thus making them likewise to suffer." Charles drew up a list with two columns on a scrap of paper. Under Marry he listed benefits, "Children–if it please God–Constant companion & friend in old age will feel interested in one,–object to be beloved and played with, better than a dog anyhow", while under Not Marry he put "Freedom to go where one liked ... Not forced to visit relatives ... to have the expense and anxiety of children ... fatness & idleness ... if many children forced to earn one's bread ...". He jotted down further thoughts, then concluded "My God, it is intolerable to think of spending ones whole life, like a neuter bee, working, working, & nothing after all. – No, no won't do. – Imagine living all one's day solitarily in smoky dirty London House. – Only picture to yourself a nice soft wife on a sofa with good fire, & books & music perhaps – Compare this vision with the dingy reality of Grt. Marlbro' St. Marry–Marry–Marry Q.E.D."

Then he spent his fortnight being "Very idle at Shrewsbury" which meant starting his "D" notebook on the transmutation sequence and his "M" notebook on the evolutionary basis of moral and social behaviour, filling sixty pages with notes and anecdotes from his father about experiences with patients.

Having come down in favour, he went to visit his cousin Emma on 29 July. He did not get around to proposing, but failed to conceal his ideas on transmutation. Emma noted "he is the most open, transparent man I ever saw, and every word expresses his real thoughts." When she asked about ultimate origins he steered clear of the subject, aware that "it will become necessary to show how the first eye is formed" which he could not yet do.

== Malthus and natural law ==
After returning to London on 1 August 1838 Darwin read a review of Auguste Comte's Positive Philosophy at the Athenaeum Club. It bolstered his pantheist ideas of natural laws, making him remark "What a magnificent view one can take of the world" with everything synchronised "by certain laws of harmony", a vision "far grander" than the Almighty individually creating "a long succession of vile Molluscous animals – How beneath the dignity of Him"! Only a "cramped imagination" saw God "warring against those very laws he established in all organic nature." His work on Coral Reefs and a paper theorising that Glen Roy had been an arm of the sea soldiered on. He visited the zoo to experiment, observing the reactions of the apes and seeing emotions like "revenge and anger", implying that "Our descent, then, [is the root] of our evil passions." He needed an ally, and hinted to Lyell that his work was "bearing on the question of species", amassing "facts, which begin to group themselves clearly under sub-laws."

Then in late September he began reading "for amusement" the 6th edition of Malthus's An Essay on the Principle of Population which reminded him of Malthus's statistical proof that human populations breed beyond their means and compete to survive, at a time when he was primed to apply these ideas to animal species. Malthus had softened from the bleakness of the earlier editions, now allowing that the population crush could be mitigated by education, celibacy and emigration. Already Radical crowds were demonstrating against the harsh imposition of Malthusian ideas in the Poor Laws, and a slump was resulting in mass emigration. Lyell was convinced that animals were also driven to spread their territory by overpopulation, but Darwin went further in applying the Whig social thinking of struggle for survival with no handouts. His views were secular, but not atheistic. He asked how God's laws had produced "so high a mind" as ours, with purpose shown by descent geared towards the "production of higher animals", suggesting that "we are [a] step towards some higher end".

Malthus's essay calculates from the birth rate that human population could double every 25 years, but in practice growth is kept in check by death, disease, wars and famine. Darwin was well prepared to see at once that this related to de Candolle's concept of "nature's war" and also applies to the struggle for existence amongst wildlife, so that when there is more population than resources can maintain, favourable variations that allow the organism to better use the limited resources available tend to be preserved, and unfavourable ones destroyed by being unable to get the means for existence, resulting in the formation of new species. On 28 September 1838 he noted this insight, describing it as a kind of wedging, forcing adapted structures into gaps in the economy of nature formed as weaker ones were thrust out. He now had a theory by which to work.

== Proposal ==
Darwin's thoughts and work continued and he suffered repeated bouts of illness. On 11 November he returned to Maer Hall and proposed to Emma.

Again he discussed his ideas, and she subsequently wrote telling him of her "fear that our opinions on the most important subject should differ widely. My reason tells me that honest & conscientious doubts cannot be a sin, but I feel it would be a painful void between us. I thank you from my heart for your openness with me & I should dread the feeling that you were concealing your opinions from the fear of giving me pain." She continued; "my own dear Charley we now do belong to each other & I cannot help being open with you. Will you do me a favour? yes I am sure you will, it is to read our Saviours farewell discourse to his disciples which begins at the end of the 13th Chap of John. It is so full of love to them & devotion & every beautiful feeling." In the Farewell Discourse from the Gospel of St. John, Jesus instructs his disciples to "love one another", a central part of Christian doctrine which emphasises the need for belief. For Emma the importance of faith had been reinforced by the death of her sister Fanny in 1832, and her need to meet Fanny again in the afterlife. She clearly felt that Darwin would be able to overcome doubt and believe. John 15 also says "If a man abide not in me...they are burned". Darwin's warm reply reassured her, and she replied that "To see you in earnest on the subject will be my greatest comfort & that I am sure you are. I believe I agree with every word you say, & it pleased me that you shd have felt inclined to enter a little more on the subject." However, this tension would remain.

Emma's father promised a dowry of £5,000 plus £400 a year, while Doctor Darwin added £10,000 for Charles, to be invested. They decided to move to London until Charles had "wearied the geological public" with his itch to write, then they would "decide, whether the pleasures of retirement & country... are preferable to society."

== Theory ==
Charles went house-hunting by day. At night he thought about "innumerable variations" (which he still thought were acquired in some way) with competitive nature selecting the best leading to step by step change, while vestigial organs like the human coccyx (tail) were not, as commonly thought, God "rounding out his original thought [to its] exhaustion", but ancestral remnants pointing to "the parent of man".

Darwin considered Malthus's argument, that human populations breed beyond their means and compete to survive, in relation to his findings about species relating to localities, earlier enquiries into animal breeding, and ideas of Natural "laws of harmony". Around late November 1838 he compared breeders selecting traits to a Malthusian Nature selecting from random variants, now thrown up by "chance", and in mid-December described this comparison as "a beautiful part of my theory, that domesticated races of organics are made by precisely same means as species – but latter far more perfectly & infinitely slower", so that in "species every part of newly acquired structure is fully practical & perfected."

The second edition of Charles Babbage's The Ninth Bridgewater Treatise. A Fragment published that year included a copy of a letter John Herschel had sent to Charles Lyell in 1836, not long before Darwin visited Herschel in Cape Town. On 2 December, Darwin wrote in his E Notebook "Babbage 2d Edit. p. 226 – Herschel calls the appearance of new species the mystery of mysteries, & has grand passage upon the problem.! Hurrah – 'intermediate causes' ". Herschel's letter advocated seeking natural causes, as opposed to miraculous causes, and gave philosophical justification to Darwin's project.

=== Stress ===
The Zoology ran into difficulties, with Richard Owen having to halt work on Fossil Mammalia, and John Gould sailing off for Tasmania leaving Darwin to complete the half finished Birds. "What can a man have to say, who works all morning in describing hawks & owls; & then rushes out, & walks in a bewildered manner up one street & down another, looking out for the word To Let'." Emma had arranged to come with the Hensleigh Wedgwoods to London for a week to help with the search for a house, and wrote telling him "It is very well I am coming to look after you my poor old man", before arriving on 6 December.

On 19 December 1838 as secretary of the Geological Society of London Darwin witnessed the vicious interrogation by Owen and his allies including Sedgwick and Buckland of Darwin's old tutor Robert Edmund Grant when they ridiculed Grant's Lamarckian heresy in a clear reminder of establishment hatred of evolutionism.

During her visit, Emma thought Darwin looked unwell and overtired. At the end of December she wrote urging him "to leave town at once & get some rest. You have looked so unwell for some time that I fear you will be laid up... nothing could make me so happy as to feel that I could be of any use or comfort to my own dear Charles when he is not well. So don't be ill any more my dear Charley till I can be with you to nurse you".

== Marriage ==
On 29 December 1838, Darwin took the let of a furnished property at 12 Upper Gower Street. He wrote to Emma that "Gower St is ours, yellow curtains & all", and of his delight at being the "possessor of Macaw Cottage". which he long recalled for its gaudy coloured walls and furniture that "combined all the colours of the macaw in hideous discord", Emma rejoiced at their getting a house she liked, while hoping that they had got rid of "that dead dog out of the garden". Darwin impatiently moved his "museum" in on 31 December, astounding himself, Erasmus and the porters with the weight of his luggage containing geological specimens.

On 24 January 1839 he was honoured by being elected as Fellow of the Royal Society and presented his paper on the Roads of Glen Roy. The next day he took the train home to Shrewsbury, then on the 28th travelled to Maer Hall.

On 29 January 1839, Charles married Emma at Maer, Staffordshire in an Anglican ceremony arranged to also suit the Unitarians, conducted by the vicar, their cousin John Allen Wedgwood. Emma's bedridden mother slept through the service, sparing Emma "the pain of parting". Immediately afterwards Charles and Emma rushed off to the railway station, raising their relative's eyebrows, and ate their sandwiches and toasted their future from a "bottle of water" on the train. Back at Macaw Cottage, Charles noted in his journal "Married at Maer & returned to London 30 years old", and in his "E" notebook recorded uncle John Wedgwood's views on turnips.

See the development of Darwin's theory for the ensuing developments, in the context of his life, work and outside influences at the time.
