= Florence Dawson =

Florence Dawson may refer to:

- The real name of English dancer and impersonator Florence Desmond
- A pen name of English writer Frances Julia Wedgwood
