= English etymology =

English etymology is the study of where English words came from. It may refer to:

- History of the English language
- English words of Greek origin
- List of Greek morphemes used in English
- List of Greek and Latin roots in English
- Latin influence in English
- List of Latin words with English derivatives
- Lists of English words by country or language of origin
- Classical compound
- Hybrid word § English examples
- List of common false etymologies of English words

== Bibliography ==
- The Oxford Dictionary of English Etymology
- A Dictionary of English Etymology
