= Development of Darwin's theory =

Significant aspect in the history of evolutionary biology

Following the inception of Charles Darwin's theory of natural selection in 1838, the development of Darwin's theory to explain the "mystery of mysteries" of how new species originated was his "prime hobby" in the background to his main occupation of publishing the scientific results of the Beagle voyage. He was settling into married life, but suffered from bouts of illness and after his first child was born the family moved to rural Down House as a family home away from the pressures of London.

The publication in 1839 of his Journal and Remarks (now known as The Voyage of the Beagle) brought him success as an author, and in 1842 he published his first major scientific book, The Structure and Distribution of Coral Reefs, setting out his theory of the formation of coral atolls. He wrote out a sketch setting out his basic ideas on transmutation of species, which he expanded into an "essay" in 1844, and discussed his theory with friends as well as continuing with experiments and wide investigations. In the same year the anonymous Vestiges of the Natural History of Creation brought wide public interest in evolutionary ideas, but also showed the need for sound evidence to gain scientific acceptance of evolution.

In 1846 he completed his third geological book, and turned from supervising the publication of expert reports on the findings from the voyage to examining barnacle specimens himself. This grew into an eight-year study, making use of his theory to find hitherto unknown relationships between the many species of barnacle, and establishing his expertise as a biologist. His faith in Christianity dwindled and he stopped going to church. In 1851 his treasured daughter suffered a long illness and died. In 1854 he resumed his work on the species question which led on to the publication of Darwin's theory.

== Background ==
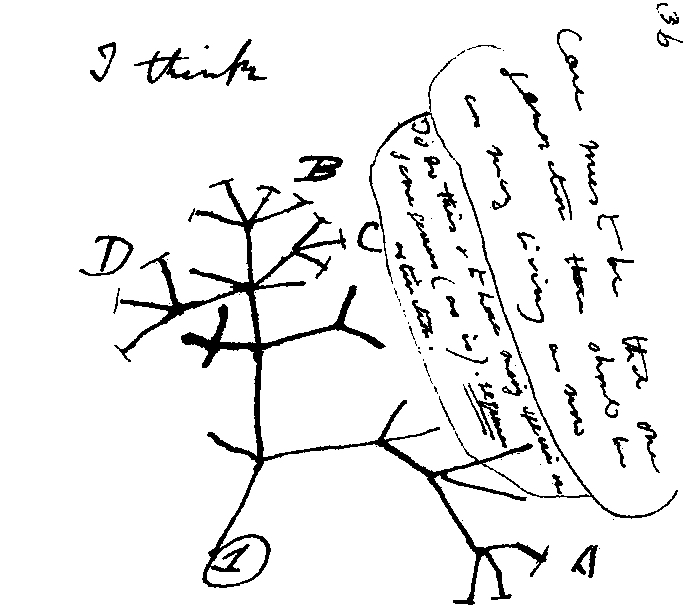
Darwin's first sketch of an evolutionary tree from his First Notebook on Transmutation of Species (1837)

Charles Darwin became a naturalist at a point in the history of evolutionary thought when theories of Transmutation were being developed to explain discrepancies in the established faith based explanations of species. He considered these problems at first hand during the Beagle survey. On its return in 1836 his ideas developed rapidly. His collections and writings established him as an eminent geologist and collector.

Darwin read Malthus's Essay on the Principle of Population in the context of his findings about species relating to localities, enquiries into animal breeding, and ideas of Natural "laws of harmony". Around late November 1838 he compared breeders selecting traits with a Malthusian Nature selecting from variants thrown up by "chance" so that "every part of newly acquired structure is fully practical & perfected", thinking this "a beautiful part of my theory" of how species originated.

His theory of how species originated had now come together in principle, but he was vividly aware of the difficulties he would face in getting it accepted by his friends and colleagues in the scientific establishment. On 19 December 1838 as secretary of the Geological Society of London Darwin witnessed the vicious interrogation by Richard Owen and his allies of Darwin's old tutor Robert Edmund Grant in which they ridiculed Grant's Lamarckian heresy, showing establishment intolerance of materialist theories.

== Married life ==
In 1839, now married to Emma and settled in London, Darwin continued to look to the countryside for information and began a Questions & Experiments notebook with ideas that would have seemed bizarrely mundane to the "philosophical" scientists of the time. He printed Questions about the Breeding of Animals and sent them out to gentlemen farmers, asking for information on animal husbandry from their nurserymen and gamekeepers on how they crossed varieties or selected offspring. Of only three who responded one simply found the questions too overwhelming to answer. He found agreement with the visiting Swiss botanist Alphonse de Candolle whose father Augustin had used the idea of "nature's war". However, when he tried explaining his theory to Hensleigh Wedgwood, his cousin "seemed to think it absurd... that [a] tiger springing an inch further would determine his preservation".

The publication in May of Darwin's Journal and Remarks (The Voyage of the Beagle) brought reviews accusing him of theorising rather than letting the facts speak for themselves. He turned his attention to expanding his investigations and theory of the formation of coral atolls as the first part of his planned book on geology.

In December as Emma's first pregnancy progressed, Charles fell ill and accomplished little during the following year. He did accept a position on the Council of the Geographical Society in May 1840. In 1841 he became able to work for short periods a couple of days a week, and produced a paper on stones and debris being carried by ice floes, but his condition did not improve. Having consulted his father he began looking for a house in the countryside to escape a city suffering from economic depression and civil unrest. Owen was one of the few scientific friends to visit Darwin at this time, but Owen's opposition to any hint of Transmutation made Darwin keep quiet about his theories.

== First writings on the theory ==
In January 1842 Darwin sent a tentative description of his ideas in a letter to Lyell, who was then touring America. Lyell, dismayed that his erstwhile ally had become a Transmutationist, noted that Darwin "denies seeing a beginning to each crop of species".

Darwin's book The Structure and Distribution of Coral Reefs on his theory of atoll formation was published in May after more than three years of work, with Part 4: Fish of Zoology of the Voyage of H.M.S. Beagle also going to print. Illness was a continuing problem, and he and Emma left London on 18 May, visiting her parents at Maer Hall before moving on to Shrewsbury on 15 June for rest and quiet. Now Darwin "first allowed myself the satisfaction of writing a very brief abstract of my theory in pencil in 35 pages", the '"Pencil Sketch"' of his theory. This discussed farmers breeding animals, gave the analogy of overpopulation and competition leading to "Natural Selection" through the "war of nature" and the mechanism of descent. Every living thing was related in a branching pedigree, not ascending a Lamarckian ladder, and this pedigree was the proper basis for classification. He thought it "derogatory" to argue that God had made every kind of parasite and worm on an individual whim. Already, a rough form of the phrasing and ideas which he went on to publish 17 years later in the closing paragraph of On the Origin of Species can be seen in his conclusion in this first draft:

From death, famine, rapine, and the concealed war of nature we can see that the highest good, which we can conceive, the creation of the higher animals has directly come. Doubtless it at first transcends our humble powers, to conceive laws capable of creating individual organisms, each characterised by the most exquisite workmanship and widely-extended adaptations. It accords better with [our modesty] the lowness of our faculties to suppose each must require the fiat of a creator, but in the same proportion the existence of such laws should exalt our notion of the power of the omniscient Creator. There is a simple grandeur in the view of life with its powers of growth, assimilation and reproduction, being originally breathed into matter under one or a few forms, and that whilst this our planet has gone circling on according to fixed laws, and land and water, in a cycle of change, have gone on replacing each other, that from so simple an origin, through the process of gradual selection of infinitesimal changes, endless forms most beautiful and most wonderful have been evolved.

=== Essay ===
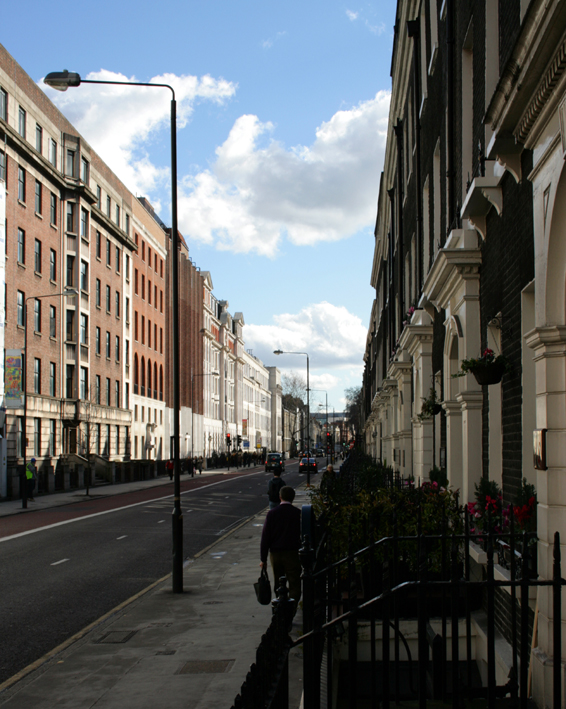
The Darwins lived in Gower Street in London.

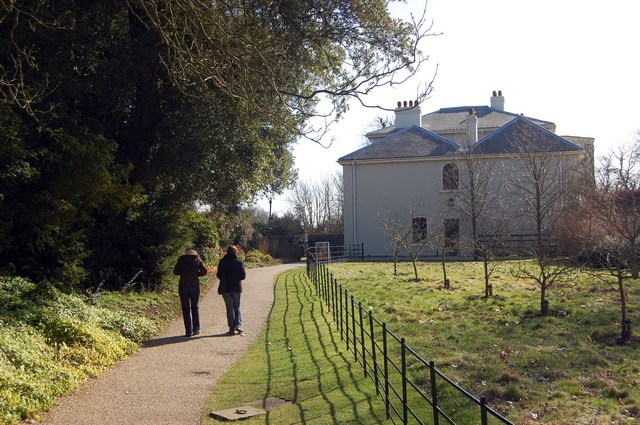
In 1842 they moved to Down House in rural Kent.

They returned on 18 July to a London seething with Chartist unrest, and Darwin copied and scribbled changes to his "Sketch" until it was almost illegible. He returned to house hunting and found a former parsonage in the rural hamlet of Downe at a good price. A general strike led to huge demonstrations all over London, but was crushed by troops by the time Darwin moved. On 17 September 1842 the family moved into Down House (around 1850 the village changed its name to Downe to avoid confusion with County Down in Ireland, but the house kept the old spelling). After a series of alterations Darwin settled in, and in 1843 returned to writing his Volcanic Islands. In May he began a (mostly geological) country diary he called The General Aspect.

In response to a request from George Robert Waterhouse for advice on classification, Darwin replied that it properly "consists in grouping beings according to their actual relationship, ie their consanguinity, or descent from common stocks". He followed this up with another letter expressing belief that "all the orders, families & genera amongst the Mammals are merely artificial terms highly useful to show the relationship of those members of the series, which have not become extinct", before cautiously asking for the letter to be returned. Waterhouse was influenced by Owen and in a paper attacked such heresies, setting his species in the symbolic circles of the Quinarian system, not hereditary trees. Darwin sent a sharp response about these "vicious circles".

Darwin became a close friend of the botanist Joseph Dalton Hooker, and on 11 January 1844 wrote to with melodramatic humour that he was "almost convinced (quite contrary to opinion I started with) that species are not (it is like confessing a murder) immutable. Heaven forfend me from Lamarck nonsense of a "tendency to progression" “adaptations from the slow willing of animals" &c,—but the conclusions I am led to are not widely different from his—though the means of change are wholly so— I think I have found out (here's presumption!) the simple way by which species become exquisitely adapted to various ends." Hooker's reply was cautious but friendly, saying that "There may in my opinion have been a series of productions on different spots, & also a gradual change of species. I shall be delighted to hear how you think that this change may have taken place, as no presently conceived opinions satisfy me on the subject."

Darwin worked up his "Sketch" into a 189-page '"Essay"' and in July entrusted the manuscript to the local schoolmaster to copy. He then wrote a difficult letter to be opened by his wife in the event of his death requesting that the essay be published posthumously. He started his Geological Observations on South America, and corresponded with Hooker about this, feeding in questions related to his "Essay". The copied "Essay", now 231 pages, was returned to him for corrections in September. Then one day he brought it to Emma and asked her to read it. She went through the pages, making notes in the margins pointing out unclear passages and showing where she disagreed.

The Reverend Leonard Jenyns, a naturalist Darwin had known since his time at the University of Cambridge, had at Darwin's request contributed the volume on Fish in Zoology of the Voyage of H.M.S. Beagle, and was now working on a book of notes on observations of plants and animals. On 12 October Darwin wrote to tell him that "work on the species question has impressed me very forcibly with the importance of all such works, as your intended one, containing what people are pleased generally to call trifling facts. These are the facts, which make one understand the working or œconomy of nature .... namely what are the checks & what the periods of life, by which the increase of any given species is limited." He told Jenyns that he had "continued steadily reading & collecting facts on variation of domestic animals & plants & on the question of what are species; I have a grand body of facts & I think I can draw some sound conclusions. The general conclusion at which I have slowly been driven from a directly opposite conviction is that species are mutable & that allied species are co-descendants of common stocks. I know how much I open myself, to reproach, for such a conclusion, but I have at least honestly & deliberately come to it. I shall not publish on this subject for several years." In November he thanked Jenyns for sending a detailed note, and told him "With respect to my far-distant work on species, I must have expressed myself with singular inaccuracy, if I led you to suppose that I meant to say that my conclusions were inevitable. They have become so, after years of weighing puzzles, to myself alone;; but in my wildest day-dream, I never expect more than to be able to show that there are two sides to the question of the immutability of species, ie whether species are directly created, or by intermediate laws, (as with the life & death of individuals)." He outlined the events that had led him to these ideas, and while cautious about "numerous immense difficulties on my notions" told him that he had "drawn up a sketch & had it copied (in 200 pages) of my conclusions; & if I thought at some future time, that you would think it worth reading, I shd. of course be most thankful to have the criticism of so competent a critic." Jenyns never took up this offer to read the "Essay", but did advise Darwin on possible issues with the term "mutation". Darwin replied "it will be years before I publish, so that I shall have plenty of time to think of better words".

=== Vestiges published ===
In October 1844 Transmutation became a middle class talking point with the anonymous publication of Vestiges of the Natural History of Creation by Robert Chambers presenting Lamarckian views. It brought the notion of transmutation out into the public arena and was a sensation, quickly becoming a best-seller in fashionable society circles and going into new editions. Darwin read it in November, and when questioned by Hooker in January he admired its prose, but wrote that the "geology strikes me as bad, & his zoology far worse". The book was liked by many Quakers and Unitarians. Darwin's friend the Unitarian physiologist William Carpenter called it "a very beautiful and a very interesting book", and helped Chambers with correcting later editions. Critics thanked God that the author began "in ignorance and presumption", for the revised versions "would have been much more dangerous". Vestiges paved the way for discussion, but emphasised the need for secure mastery of awkward facts.

Hooker became Darwin's mainstay in the search to find and explain anomalous facts, though Darwin was greatly disappointed in February 1845 when Hooker was invited to teach botany at Edinburgh. Others helping included Captain Beaufort of the Admiralty who invited Darwin to list any facts he wanted checking, for investigation by ship's surgeons (naturalists) when their ship was in the appropriate part of the world. In March Darwin followed his father's investment advice and became owner of a farmhouse and estate in Lincolnshire, where the Reverend Samuel Wilberforce advised local squires to take education in hand lest the countryfolk learn "a smattering of science" and forget their God-given duties.

The publisher John Murray made an offer of payment for a revised second edition of Journal and Remarks, diverting Darwin's attention from South America. On 25 April Darwin began extensive revisions incorporating his latest information and interpretations, including several hints about his species speculation. He now saw the Galápagos Archipelago as "a little world within itself, or rather a satellite attached to America, whence it has derived a few stray colonists," where we were "astonished at the number of their aboriginal beings, and at their confined range", and "seem to be brought somewhat near to that great fact – that mystery of mysteries – the first appearance of new beings on this earth." On 5 August Darwin began reading Lyell's Travels in North America, and was horrified that it saw no harm in slavery. He added two new paragraphs to his Journal, cataloguing atrocities after stating "I thank God, I shall never again visit a slave-country", and finished his revisions on 26 August.

Anglican clergymen / naturalists had been slow to respond to Vestiges, not wanting to give its vile ideas of transmutation publicity, but it sold increasing numbers to polite society. In the July Edinburgh Review a lengthy and scathing attack by Adam Sedgwick, who had taught Darwin geology at university, predicted "ruin and confusion in such a creed" which if taken up by the populace would "undermine the whole moral and social fabric" bringing "discord and deadly mischief in its train." On 8 October Darwin wrote telling Lyell that the review was "far from popular with non-scientific readers. I think some few passages savour of the dogmatism of the pulpit, rather than of the philosophy of the Professor chair". Nevertheless, it was "a grand piece of argument against mutability of species; & I read it with fear & trembling, but was well pleased to find, that I had not overlooked any of the arguments, though I had put them to myself as feebly as milk & water."

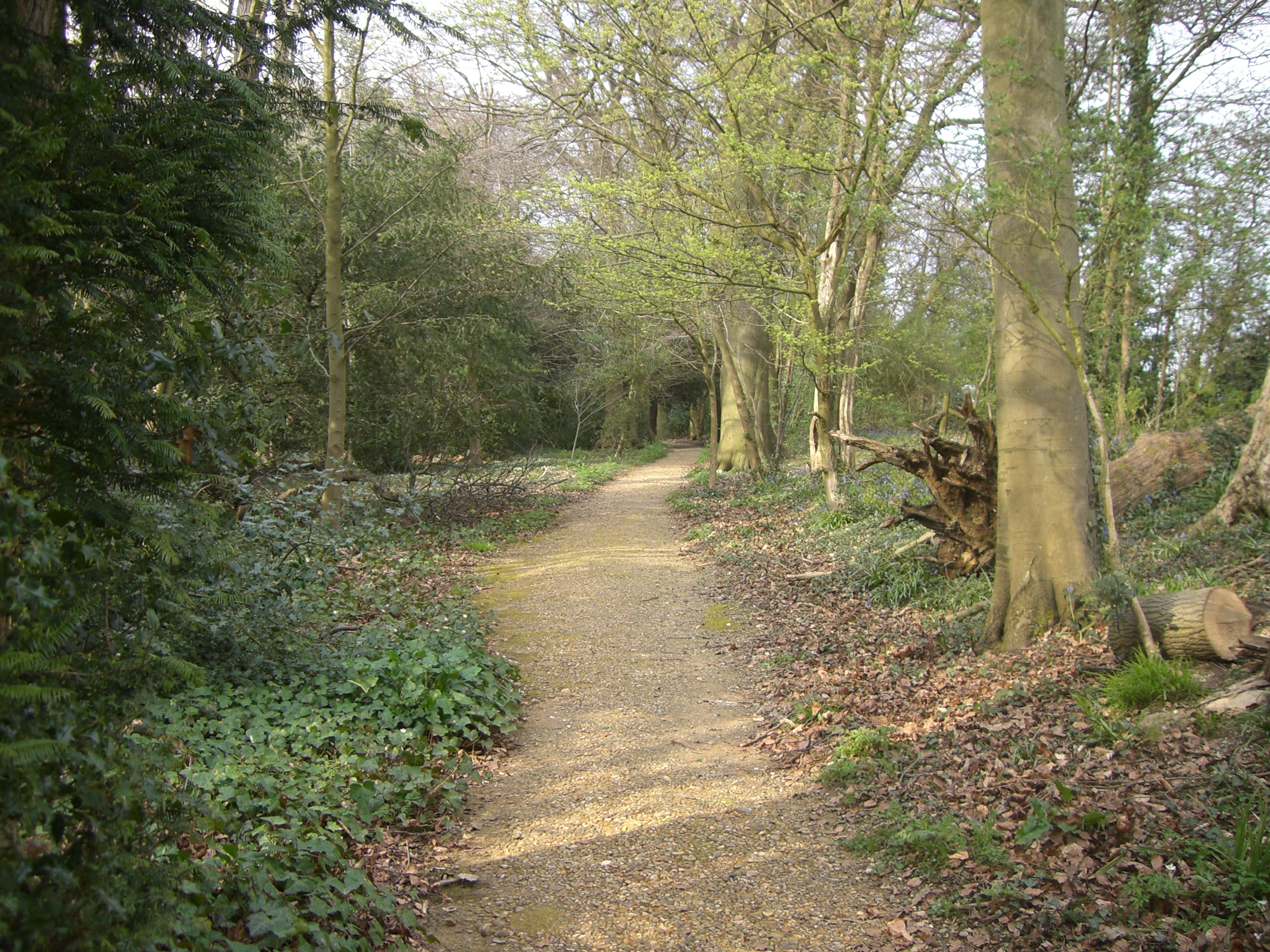
In 1846 Darwin rented land from his neighbour John Lubbock to plant woodland and lay out the "sandwalk" at Down House which became his usual "Thinking Path".

In correspondence Darwin continued to discuss his species work with Hooker, and he took it personally when Hooker remarked of another naturalist "that no one has hardly a right to examine the question of species who has not minutely described many." However, even Richard Owen who was opposed to any mutability in species had told him it was "a very fair subject" with a mass of facts to be investigated, "& though I shall get more kicks than half-pennies, I will, life serving, attempt my work." Early in November Darwin, hinting that "geographical distrib: will be the key which will unlock the mystery of species", invited Hooker to "look over a rough sketch (well copied) on this subject" while fearing this was "too impudent a request".

Darwin's researches led to a meeting on 23 November with Charles James Fox Bunbury, in which he discussed the geographical distribution of plants and animals, particularly in the Galapagos islands where they strikingly showed "a South American character as it were stamped on them all, while nearly all the species are peculiar." As Bunbury recalled, "He avowed himself to some extent a believer in the transmutation of species, though not, he said, exactly according to the doctrine either of Lamarck or of the Vestiges. But he admitted that all the leading botanists and zoologists, of this country at least, are on the other side." Darwin was familiarising the "most rising naturalists" with the idea, and on 6 December enjoyed having Hooker, Edward Forbes, Hugh Falconer, and George Robert Waterhouse visit Down for dinner and "raging discussions".

In the following year potato blight brought famine which impinged on the Darwins' servants and workmen, and led to overthrow of the Corn Laws. Darwin welcomed this, but as a landowner now found that it affected his income from rent and he wrote to his agent that "Although I am on principle a free-trader, of course I am not willing to make a larger reduction than necessary to retain a good tenant." Despite his own illness recurring, Darwin pressed on with South America, having to jointly subsidise it with the publisher when the Treasury grant ran out, and it was completed by October 1846.

== Barnacles ==
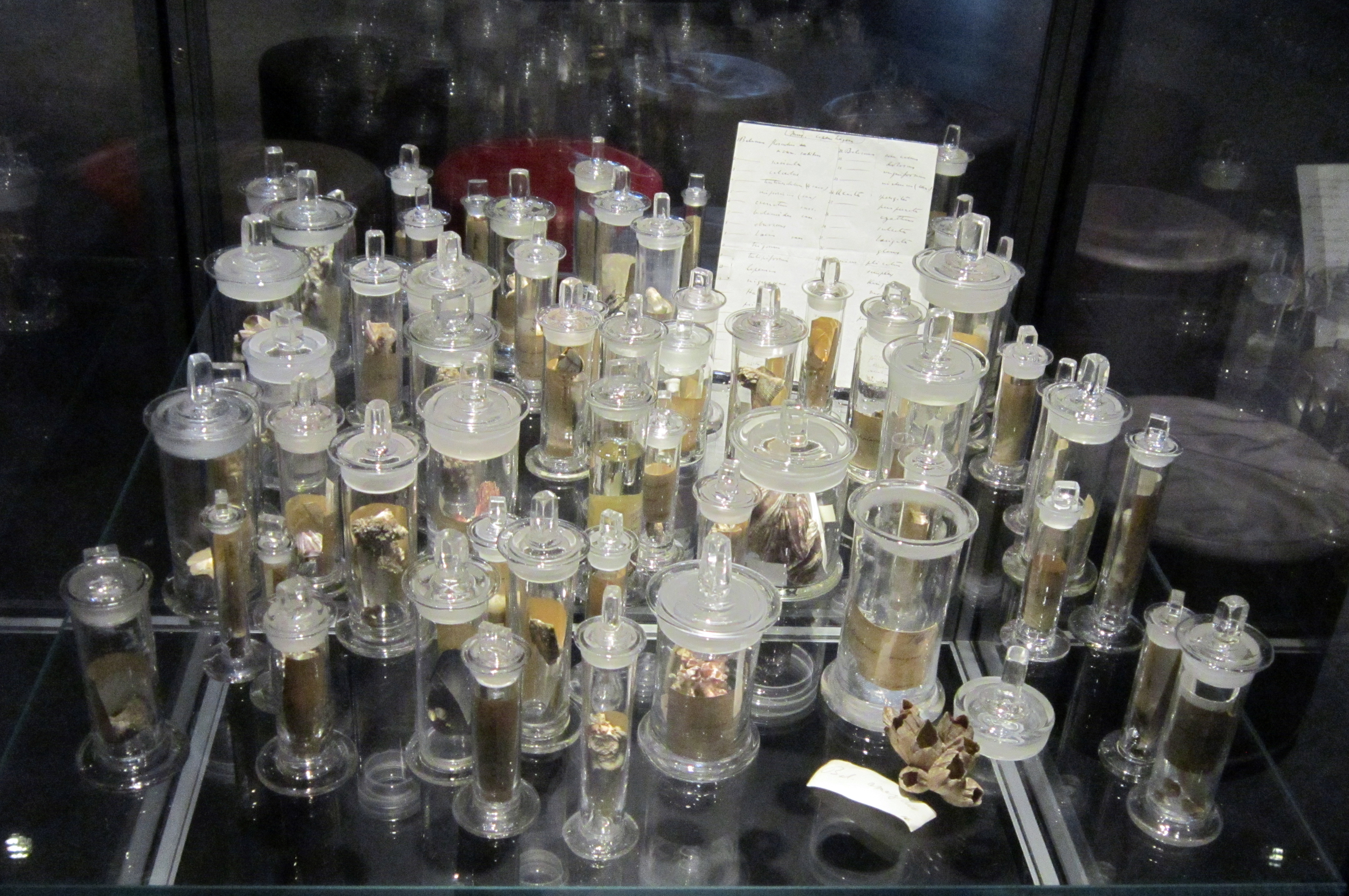
Barnacles from Darwin's collection, sent as a gift to Japetus Steenstrup and Johan Georg Forchhammer in 1854, Zoological Museum of Copenhagen

A single barnacle species was left to describe, and on 1 October 1846 Darwin began a paper on it, working on dissecting with the assistance of Hooker who was now at Kew. To compare this with other species he borrowed specimens, and soon became involved in a much needed comprehensive study of these peculiar creatures that had recently been found to be crustaceans rather than molluscs. To Hooker such an exhaustive study might dampen Darwin's tendency to speculative theorising, and to Darwin it would establish his credentials.

=== Hooker reads the "Essay" ===
Hooker paid frequent visits, and in January 1847 when Darwin was particularly ill Hooker took away a copy of the "Essay". After some delays he sent a page of notes, giving the calm critical feedback that Darwin needed. He did not go along with Darwin's rejection of continuing Creation, arguing "All allusions to superintending providence unnecessary – The Creator able to make first [organisms] able also to go on directing & [it's] a matter of moonshine to [the] argument whether he does or no." Their debates continued, sometimes argumentatively, and Darwin felt devastated by Hooker's intention to set off on a survey voyage.

=== British Association: Vestiges and Wilberforce ===
Darwin overcame illness to attend the British Association for the Advancement of Science meeting at Oxford in May 1847, to discuss the "Sketch" with Hooker. Darwin attended the geological section which featured a talk by Robert Chambers on ancient beaches. An observer at the meeting reported that Chambers "pushed his conclusions to a most unwarrantable length and got roughly handled on account of it by Buckland, De la Beche, Sedgwick, Murchison, and Lyell. The last told me afterwards that he did so purposely that [Chambers] might see that reasonings in the style of the author of the Vestiges would not be tolerated among scientific men." This was a clear warning from Darwin's Cambridge friends.

On the Sunday Samuel Wilberforce, now the Bishop of Oxford, used his sermon at St. Mary's Church on "the wrong way of doing science" to deliver a stinging attack obviously aimed at Chambers. The church "crowded to suffocation" with geologists, astronomers and zoologists heard jibes about the "half-learned" seduced by the "foul temptation" of speculation looking for a self-sustaining universe in a "mocking spirit of unbelief", showing a failure to understand the "modes of the Creator's acting" or to meet the responsibilities of a gentleman. Chambers denounced this as an attempt to stifle progressive opinion, but others thought he must have gone home "with the feeling of a martyr". Darwin was not present, but in the following week at the Association dissociated himself from the error-ridden Vestiges in Lyell's presence, attacking the author's "poverty of intellect" and dismissing it as a "literary curiosity."

=== Health problems ===
For the rest of the year, Darwin suffered increasing health problems, with fiercely inflamed boils, and in November Hooker left for India. Darwin returned his attention to family life and dissecting barnacles. In February 1848 the leader of British science Sir John Herschel wrote recruiting Darwin to a project drawing up instructions for sailors on scientific fieldwork, at the request of the First Sea Lord. Darwin spent five weeks writing a section for the manual explaining how any gentleman could "geologize".

That summer a revolution in France was followed by a massive Chartist demonstration in London, with the wealthy and the Queen fleeing to safety. Darwin's friends were mustered to defend the scientific institutions against the possibility of attacks by rioters who would have welcomed his secret theory. Continuing with the barnacles he found that what seemed like minute parasites were in some cases the minute males "& half embedded in the flesh of their wives they spend their whole lives", a "wonder of nature" not flattering to the Creation idea that God appointed the social system.

Darwin visited The Mount, Shrewsbury for the 82nd birthday of his father who was now seriously ill. He became desperately ill himself and returned home to be nursed by Emma who gave birth to their third son in August, then in November was devastated when his father died. Emma sustained him, and they read religious books together. In February 1849 he drew some comfort from Harriet Martineau's new Eastern Life, Past and Present, a travelogue of tombs with the message that Christian beliefs in reward and punishment were founded in heathen superstitions.

=== Water Cure ===
His illness had long baffled doctors. Reluctantly and sceptically he took friend's advice and the whole family and household set out on 8 March 1849 for Malvern so that he could try Dr James Gully's Water Cure Establishment for a two-month cold water treatment. They rented "The Lodge" in a quiet location nearby, and he embarked on a course including drinking spa water and being scrubbed in cold water, walks for exercise, a strict diet and mesmerism and homoeopathic medicines.

The family enjoyed the spring weather and liked Dr Gully, and it developed into a delightful holiday in the festive atmosphere around the spa. His stomach trouble was diagnosed as nervous in origin, and he was soon free of sickness and walking seven miles (11 km) a day. Despite his suspicions of quackery, the cure worked, and after staying 16 weeks they returned home, arriving on 30 June with Darwin eager to resume work on his barnacles.

He continued a slightly relaxed version of the treatment, having a hut built with a cold water douche and getting up at seven a.m. to get heated up with a spirit lamp then take a cold plunge bath and get scrubbed by his butler. In September his duties as Vice-President of the British Association and interest in a paper on barnacles led him to attend their meeting at Birmingham, but he found it unpleasant and the excitement brought back the sickness. Even after a quick visit to Dr Gully and rest at home, he took weeks to recover.

=== Homologies in barnacles ===
His investigation of barnacles now found how their segmentation related to other crustaceans, showing how they had diverged from their relatives. To Owen, such "homologies" in comparative anatomy showed "archetypes" in the Divine mind, but to Darwin, this was evidence of Descent, showing dramatically how organs could have changed functions to meet new conditions. Darwin was "cock-a-hoop", writing to Louis Agassiz of this odd metamorphosis and getting him and others around the world to send more barnacle specimens. His cascade of letters made Hooker tire of barnacle details, and write from the Himalayas that on reflection he really did prefer to hear the evolutionary speculation after all. Darwin responded that "this is too bad" as "your decided approval of my Barnacle work" had "led me...to defer my species-paper" in the first place.

As his work progressed on to fossil barnacles, pressures brought on illness again and in June 1850 he went to Malvern for a week of treatment. Hooker was helping search for evidence, now trying to test evolutionary ideas and writing that "they have possessed me, without however converting me". While Hooker was not finding gradations of varieties, Darwin's barnacles were showing this to the extent that defining species was extremely difficult.

=== Annie falls ill ===
Darwin returned from Malvern at the end of June 1850 to a reawakening of his fears that his illness might be hereditary. His bright nine-year-old daughter Anne who had become a particular favourite and comfort to him fell sick. She was miserable for weeks on end, then became feverish. Their doctor could do nothing and thought it might be inherited. She had recovered to some extent by March 1851, but then she and her father were both laid low by influenza. Darwin recovered but Annie was still ill, and on 24 March he took her to Malvern, leaving her there for the best treatment he knew of, and returning to Downe where Emma had stayed as she was pregnant. With his first paper on barnacles printed and Hooker safely returned to Britain laden with specimens, things were looking up, but then on 15 April Annie suffered a serious relapse and Darwin had to rush to her side.

An agonised Darwin stayed at Annie's bedside as the crisis deepened. Dr Gully attended through the night thinking her unlikely to last, but at 6 a.m. she vomited and her condition stabilised. She seemed to recover slightly and a series of ups and downs followed with Darwin and Fanny Wedgwood anxiously watching and writing home, but she deteriorated and died on 23 April 1851.

Darwin's faith in Christianity had already dwindled away and from around 1849 he had stopped going to church. During Annie's long illness Darwin had read books by Francis William Newman, a Unitarian evolutionist who called for a new post-Christian synthesis and wrote that "the fretfulness of a child is an infinite evil". For three years Darwin had deliberated about the Christian meaning of mortality, opening a vision of tragically circumstantial nature. On 30 April he wrote a brief and intensely emotional memoir of Annie for himself and Emma.

=== Family life ===
Darwin was on good terms with the local curate. He contributed to the church, helped with parish assistance and proposed a benefit society which became the Down Friendly Society with Darwin as guardian and treasurer. On Sundays, Emma took the children to church. Darwin sometimes went with them as far as the lychgate to the churchyard, and then he would go for a walk. During the service, Emma continued to face forward when the congregation turned to face the altar for the Creed, sticking to her Unitarian faith.

The Darwins went up to the Great Exhibition in 1851, staying with "Uncle Ras", but while the children enjoyed their several visits, Darwin's ailments returned with the excitement. The slog of describing barnacles continued. Family life was rewarding but also brought pressures. The worst of his bugbears was a fear of inherited weaknesses. His oldest son William was a slow learner, and after much agonising Darwin sent him to Rugby School. While they had inherited wealth, it had to be wisely invested. A large proportion was cautiously put in railway stock, then in a boom but subject to fluctuations. He had kept records of the effects of the continuing water treatment, and finding that it was of some help with relaxation but had no significant effect he stopped it in 1852 and proceeded to try various experimental therapies without any confidence in their effects.

=== Progressive reforms ===
The Great Exhibition heralded the success of free trade and modern science in improving prosperity. There was a new appetite for liberal, progressive reforms. An alliance of thinkers began recasting nature as a competitive marketplace. The Westminster Review recently acquired by John Chapman became their focus, and an early article by Herbert Spencer set out a Malthusian view that people who multiply beyond their means take "the high road to extinction", while "the select of their generation" remained to ensure progress. Spencer became a close friend and ally of Thomas Huxley, an ambitious naturalist who had returned from a long survey trip but lacked the family wealth or contacts to find a career. Huxley had sent papers to Darwin which began a correspondence, and Darwin sent him a copy of the first volume of Barnacles when it was printed. Huxley called it an exemplary work, all the more remarkable for coming from a distinguished geologist rather than an anatomist.

In recognition of his work on South American geology, invertebrate research and particularly his work on Barnacles, Darwin was awarded the Royal Medal of the Royal Society and received it at their meeting on 30 November 1853. The excitement brought back illness and he resumed the water treatment. This time it was successful and his health improved. He finished the second volume of Barnacles, completing almost eight years of work which had made him the world's foremost authority on the subject.

In the spring of 1854 he joined the Royal Society's Philosophical Club, and he also became a Fellow of the Linnean Society of London, gaining postal access to its library. To his surprise his stomach was not troubled and he greatly enjoyed visiting London regularly and meeting with the new generation of scientists, in particular John Tyndall, Hooker and Huxley. Darwin supported them in gaining gold medals from the Society, saying that they would become "scientific giants" and he thought it only right that they should get the accolades to spur them on. Tyndall had taken the chair of natural philosophy at the Royal Institution in 1853 and was now helping Huxley run the science section of The Westminster Review. Huxley began teaching at the Royal School of Mines in November, then "sick of the dilettante middle class" began his working men's lectures a year later, and Hooker settled into his post at Kew Gardens.

Biology was becoming liberalised, even among some churchmen. The Reverend Baden Powell, a mathematics professor at the University of Oxford, applied the theological argument that God is a lawgiver, miracles break the lawful edicts issued at Creation, therefore belief in miracles is atheistic.

== Renewal of work on Species ==
By September 1854 his second volume of Barnacles had been printed and dispatched, and he turned his attention to Species, telling his cousin William Darwin Fox that he planned to "view all facts that I can master..to see how far they favour or are opposed to the notion that wild species are mutable or immutable". All available information was examined for "hostile facts" and discussed with Hooker, who had resisted what he called Darwin's "Elastic theory" but who was now developing an "utter disbelief of my own Genera and species".

In the Spring of 1855, as the Crimean War developed, Darwin was pondering the war of nature, taking the then current analogy with an industrial economy further than others, and wondering how species spread. He was dismissive of the ideas that others had put forward of sunken continents like Atlantis, and began experimenting in his house with soaking seeds in brine then seeing if they could germinate. He reported his results in Gardeners' Chronicle and roped in his curate friends including Henslow. The consul in Norway sent seed pods which had washed ashore. Hooker was able to identify them as coming from the Caribbean and get them to germinate at Kew. Investigation of variation brought him back to animal husbandry. He now began dissecting domestic animals and breeding pigeons, joining a pigeon fancier's club: very unorthodox behaviour for naturalists at that time.

Huxley had obtained a position and his friends had been having an impact on the establishment. In particular Huxley had strongly dismissed the transmutationist thesis of Chambers' Vestiges. He also argued vociferously against the dominant Owen who had demonstrated fossil evidence of an evolutionary sequence of horses as supporting his idea of development from archetypes in "ordained continuous becoming", and who had in 1854 given a British Association talk on the impossibility of bestial apes such as the recently discovered gorilla standing erect and being transmuted into men. Darwin tried at a gathering at Downe on 22 April 1856 to amiably argue Huxley and Hooker round towards accepting evolution as a process, without going into the mechanism.

Darwin intended to write human beings into Natural Selection through mid-1857. But his work required a tremendous amount of evidence and facts. He left humans out in part because "mutiny in India" had stopped his correspondence with Edward Blyth in Calcutta. Had he included sexual selection, at that time it would have been only the male competition element and not female choice.

== Towards publication ==
It was at this stage that Alfred Russel Wallace became involved and Darwin's work took on a new urgency. While Darwin continued to amass knowledge and carry out experiments, he now became committed to publication.

See the publication of Darwin's theory for the resulting developments, in the context of his life, work and outside influences at the time.
