= William Agutter =

English sermon writer and preacher

William Agutter (1758 – 26 March 1835) was an English sermon writer and preacher.

The son of Guy Agutter of All Souls', Northampton, he enrolled at Lincoln College, Oxford, on 18 March 1777, at the age of 18. In 1780 he obtained a demyship at Magdalen College, Oxford, and retained it until 1793. He graduated as B.A. in 1781, and took the degree of M.A. in 1784. On 29 May 1793 he was married to Anne Broughton, of Canonbury Place, Islington, a daughter of the Rev. Thomas Broughton.

Agutter does not seem to have held any preferment in the English church, but in 1797 he was appointed to the post of chaplain and secretary to the Asylum for Female Orphans in London. He enjoyed a high reputation as a preacher, and many of his sermons were printed by request. The best known of them was preached at St. Mary's, Oxford, before the university on 23 July 1786, and consisted of an orthodox description of "the difference between the death of the righteous and the wicked, illustrated in the instance of Dr. Samuel Johnson and David Hume, Esq." He was much attached to the prodigy John Henderson, and when his friend died at Oxford in 1788, he accompanied the corpse to Kingswood near Bristol and preached the funeral sermon on the loss which learning had sustained by his death. It was published in the same year. He died at Upper Gower Street, London, on 26 March 1835.

Agutter was the author of several other sermons on such topics as the miseries of rebellion and the abolition of the slave trade.
