= Frances Julia Wedgwood =

English feminist

- Born: 6 February 1833
- Died: 26 November 1913 (aged 80)
- Other names: Snow (nickname); Florence Dawson (pen-name)
- Occupations: philosopher; biographer; historian; literary critic; novelist
- Movement: First-wave feminism
- Parents: Hensleigh Wedgwood (1803–1891); Frances Emma Elizabeth Mackintosh
- Relatives: Charles Darwin (uncle); Thomas Wedgwood (photographer) (great-uncle); Sir James Mackintosh (grandfather)

Frances Julia Wedgwood (6 February 1833 – 26 November 1913) was an English feminist whose writing spanned philosophy, fiction, biography, history, religious studies and literary criticism. She published nearly all of her work either signed as Julia Wedgwood, or anonymously, as was common at the time, except for one early novel under the pen-name Florence Dawson. She was described as "a young woman of extreme passions and fastidious principles" and "at once a powerful reasoner and an inexorable critic of reason".

== Life and career ==
=== Childhood ===
Frances Julia Wedgwood was the daughter and the eldest of the six children of Hensleigh Wedgwood and his wife, Frances Emma Elizabeth "Fanny" Mackintosh, daughter of Sir James Mackintosh. (It is not common knowledge that Hensleigh and Fanny Wedgwood had seven children, not six. Their third child, Miles Wedgwood, died in infancy in 1836.) Fanny ran a salon in Cumberland Place attended by Macaulay, Thackeray, F. D. Maurice, Ruskin, and Carlyle. Julia was a great-granddaughter of the potter Josiah Wedgwood and a niece of Charles Darwin. Her strong intellect was apparent early - for example, she knew Latin, Greek, French, German and Italian, and later she also learnt Hebrew. She was educated largely at home, with a period at Rachel Martineau's school in Liverpool, then attended lectures at Queen's College and Bedford College, London in subjects including logic, political economy and Latin.

=== Early career and fictional works ===
Wedgwood was acknowledged as "the cleverest of her generation" in the extended Wedgwood–Darwin–Mackintosh family and she acquired renown as a "brilliant conversationalist with a passion for scientific and theological debate". In her twenties she wrote the novels An Old Debt and Framleigh Hall addressing "intellectual conflict, confused gender roles, and ill-starred sexual passion", which were well received by the public. Faced with her father's disapproval of her writing skills and topics, however, Wedgwood abandoned a third novel despite encouragement by Mrs Gaskell, whom she assisted in research for The Life of Charlotte Brontë (published in 1857): she concluded that "she had no imaginative powers" and that her "mind was 'merely analytical'".

In the ‘first detailed critical analysis of Wedgwood’s powerful social critique on the Victorian gender-norm covenant’ in Framleigh Hall and An Old Debt, Dr Madison Marshall argues that despite Wedgwood’s ‘composite notion of manhood and discriminating interrogation of Victorian womanhood’, her characters ‘ultimately conform to gendered expectations’

=== Father-daughter relationship ===
In existing accounts of the relationship between Wedgwood and her father, Hensleigh Wedgwood, the latter has been presented as the archetypal austere and bullying Victorian father who had little regard for his daughter's emotional well-being, or for her position in society as an intellectual woman in her own right. A recent account of the relationship challenges this prevailing view, however, and shows that narrow readings of the father-daughter relationship as profoundly fractured are misleading.

=== Non-fictional works in philosophy, religion, literature and history ===
Having abandoned fiction Wedgwood embarked on a prolific career in prose writing. She authored in total well over a hundred journal articles, publishing in central venues at the time such as the Westminster Review, Macmillan's Magazine, the Spectator, the Contemporary Review and many others.

In 1860-1861 Wedgwood published a two-part philosophical dialogue on the philosophical and theological significance of On the Origin of Species. She argued that evolution was compatible with Christianity. In response, her uncle Charles Darwin wrote her, stating "I must tell you how much I admire your Article (...) I think that you understand my book perfectly, and that I find a very rare event with my critics".

In 1862 she published an essay defending the imitative theory of the origin of language against the theory of Friedrich Max Muller. She followed it up with another defence in 1866. She argued that language must be understood to have emerged continuously from the behaviours of other animals, consistent with evolution. Disseminating her father's mimetic origin of language theory in both her Macmillan's magazine (1862) and Westminster Review (1866) articles, Wedgwood's voice manifests through the way difficult concepts are broached for the non-specialist audience. However, the input of Hensleigh Wedgwood is perceptible to anyone who has read his work in great detail.

During the 1860s, she also published articles on utilitarianism, Hegel, free will and determinism, science and religion, and feminism.

She was a close friend of Robert Browning for some years, and their correspondence survives for the years 1863 to 1870.

In 1870, Wedgwood published a much lauded book on the life and historical significance of John Wesley. She set up her own household in Notting Hill and in the following years she helped her uncle Charles Darwin translate the works of Linnaeus as well as publishing an array of articles on science, religion, philosophy, literature, and social reform.

In the Spectator, she published a large number of anonymous articles on topics including science and religion, positivism, free will, Aristotle, ancient Roman and Greek philosophy, John Stuart Mill, Henry Sidgwick, feminism, and more.

In the 1880s, she began to publish increasingly often in the Contemporary Review - one of the most influential later-nineteenth century journals. Her titles spanning 1872 to 1987 included the following: 1872, 'Female suffrage in its influence on married life’, 1877 - ‘Virgil, as a link between the ancient and the modern world’, 1878 – ‘Sir Walter Scott and the romantic reaction’,1881 – ‘Plutarch and unconscious Christianity of the first two centuries’, 1886 – ‘Aeschylus and Shakespeare: the Eumenides and Hamlet’, 1889 – ‘Male and female created He them’, 1890 – ‘The Midsummer Night’s Dream’, 1891 – ‘Euripides at Cambridge’,1892 – ‘Greek mythology and the Bible’, 1892 – ‘The message of Israel’, 1893 – ‘Shakespeare’s Julius Caesar’, 1893 – ‘The message of Israel: the newer criticism and the ancient ideals’. In addition, she published many reviews there of recent fiction and a number of biographical essays later incorporated into her book Nineteenth-Century Teachers. Her article 'Male and female created He them' is notable for putting forward the theory of an ancient matriarchy.

At her London home, Wedgwood also worked on "a history of the evolution of ethics in the great world civilizations, from earliest antiquity down to the scientific positivism and theological modernism of the mid-nineteenth century",. It was published in 1888 as The Moral Ideal: a Historic Study, which she described as setting out her philosophy of history. She traced a "zig-zag" pattern in history in which each civilization developed one principle fully (e.g. Ancient Greece - the unity of differences) only for the next to reach against it (e.g. Ancient Rome - the opposition of state and individual), the next to unite the two, and so on. For her this led up to the modern opposition of secular science and Christian ethics which needed to be combined in a new synthesis. The work was widely praised and consolidated her reputation as one of the leading intellectual women of the time.

Five years later, she published a follow-up work to "The Moral Ideal" – "The Message of Israel" – with the aim of re-interpreting the Judaic tradition critically in the light of ‘modernism’. In 1909 a collection of her biographical articles was published, called Nineteenth Century Teachers. She was also persuaded to work on a biography of her great-grandfather, which was finished after her death by Professor C. H. Herford.

=== Religion and later life ===
Throughout her life Wedgwood was interested in the boundaries between scientific knowledge and religious belief and was influenced by Harriet Martineau, George Eliot, James Martineau, Alexander John Scott, Frances Power Cobbe and Thomas Erskine. In her later years she donated extensively for the construction and extension of Church of England churches. She had been active in the anti-vivisection movement since the 1860s and was a friend of the leading anti-vivisectionist Frances Power Cobbe. She bequeathed much of her fortune to the cause upon her death on 26 November 1913.

== Bibliography ==
- An Old Debt (as Florence Dawson), 1858
- Framleigh Hall, 1858
- Life of John Wesley, 1870
- The Moral Ideal, 1888 and 1907
- The Message of Israel, 1894
- Nineteenth Century Teachers, 1909
