= Gower Street, London =

Road in Central London

Gower Street
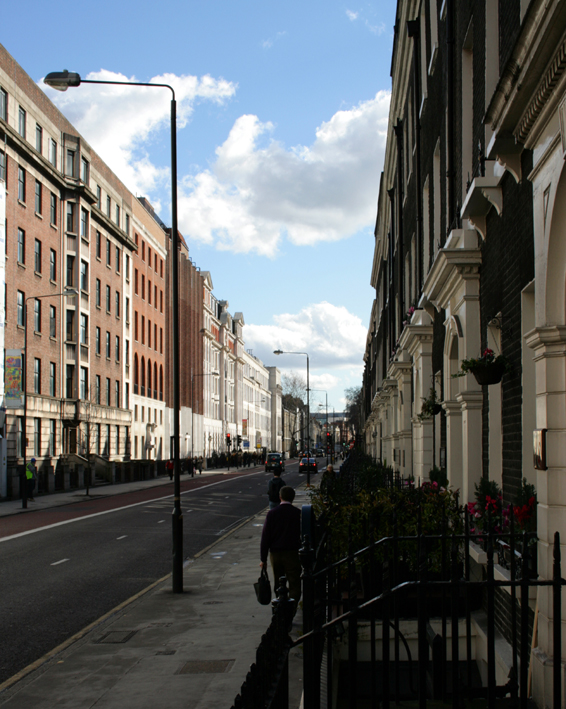
- Gower Street

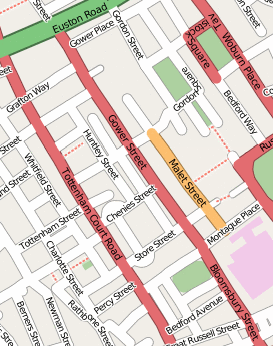
- Map of Gower Street
- Namesake: Lady Gertrude Leveson-Gower
- Type: Two-way street
- Location: London
- Coordinates: 51.5224°N 0.1326°W
- North end: Euston Road
- South end: Montague Place

Gower Street (/ˈɡaʊər/) is a street in Bloomsbury, central London, running from Euston Road at the north to Montague Place in the south. The street continues as North Gower Street north of Euston Road, while to the south it becomes Bloomsbury Street.

University College London (UCL) and the Royal Academy of Dramatic Art (RADA) are located along Gower Street as is part of University College Hospital. UCL maintains two student residences along the street: the Arthur Tattersall and John Tovell Houses. Of the many UCL buildings along Gower Street, the Cruciform Building is especially notable, both for its striking red exterior and its obvious form, even when viewed from the road. Old boys of University College School are known as "Old Gowers" after the street where it was founded and co-located with UCL. SOAS, University of London and Birkbeck College are also in proximity.

Euston Square Underground station is located at the north end of Gower Street, at the corner of Euston Road.

== History ==
Gower Street is named after Lady Gertrude Leveson-Gower, daughter of John Leveson-Gower, and who in 1737 became the second wife of Bloomsbury landowner Lord John Russell. The street name now rhymes with "power" even though the namesake surname rhymes with "pore". Gower Street was originally the name only of the southern part of the street, from the south end northwards to the junctions with Francis Street (on the west side) and Torrington Place (on the east side). The northern part of the street was called Upper Gower Street, except for the western side north of Grafton Way, which was called Gower Street North (not to be confused with North Gower Street, which was on the other side of Euston Road). The sequence of house numbers in Upper Gower Street proceeded on the east side from south to north, up to no. 27, and then on the west side from north to south, from no. 28. Gower Street North was numbered independently, from no. 1 (on the northern corner of Grafton Way and Gower Street) to approx. no. 15 (adjacent to Euston Road). In the 1860s this confusing situation came to an end when all three streets (Gower Street, Upper Gower Street, and Gower Street North) were renumbered in one continuous sequence and called Gower Street. This re-numbering proceeded from south to north on both sides of the street: the east side now contained even-numbered houses, ending in no. 142 adjacent to Euston Road, and the west side contained odd-numbered houses, from no. 87, adjacent to Francis Street, up to no. 163 adjacent to Euston Road.

== Residents ==
Notable residents of Gower Street are listed in the Survey of London. They have included the architect George Dance the Younger, painter William De Morgan, and the Shaws. John Shaw Sr., and John Shaw Jr., formed a famous 19th-century architectural partnership. Thomas Budd Shaw was a professor of English literature to the grand dukes of Russia.

The painter John Everett Millais had a studio here. North Gower Street was also the birthplace and childhood home of the artist Philip Zec and his 11 other siblings, although that was when it was still called George Street.

On 26 March 1835, the Rev. William Agutter died here.

In March 1837, Giuseppe Mazzini (Italian politician, journalist and activist for the unification of Italy) moved to 187 North Gower Street (at the time, 9 George Street, and now used for the filming of Sherlock) together with Italian poet and patriot Giovanni Ruffini, his brother Agostino Ruffini and Angelo Usiglio, living there for three years until 1840.

On 29 December 1838, Charles Darwin took the let of the furnished property at 12 Upper Gower Street (later 110 Gower Street), and wrote to tell his fiancée Emma Wedgwood of his delight at being the "possessor of Macaw Cottage". As their daughter Etty later recalled, "He used to laugh over the ugliness of their house in Gower St, and the furniture in the drawing-room, which he said combined all the colours of the macaw in hideous discord", and Darwin had christened the house "Macaw Cottage" in "allusion to the gaudy colours of the walls and furniture." He moved in on 31 December, and with Emma moved in on the day of their marriage, 29 January 1839. The development of Darwin's theory of natural selection made progress in this house, and their children William Erasmus Darwin and Anne Darwin were born there. In 1842 the family moved to Down House in the Kent countryside, and the Gower Street house became part of the warehouse system of James Shoolbred and Company. On 13 December 1904 a London County Council blue plaque was put up, to "Charles Darwin Naturalist". The house suffered from bomb damage in 1941 during the Blitz, and was not repaired. In 1961 the site became part of the Biological Sciences building of University College London, with a new plaque. The long thin garden which backed onto Gower Mews North (later Malet Place) was incorporated into Foster Court car park in 1978.

The etymologist and philologist Hensleigh Wedgwood, who was Charles Darwin's cousin and brother-in-law, lived at 94 Gower Street; he died there in 1891.

From 1869 to 1892, 102 Gower Street was the home of the barrister William Belt who was best known for his erratic behaviour in later life which was widely reported by popular newspapapers for the amusement of their readers.

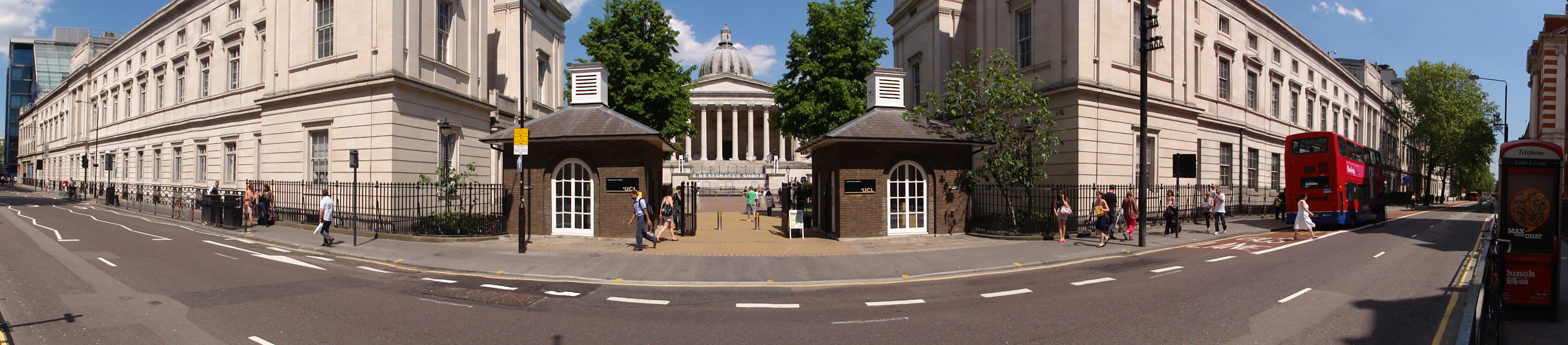
UCL entrance

On the wall of the University College building, an elaborate wall plaque carries the legend: "Close to this place Richard Trevithick (Born 1771 - Died 1833) Pioneer of High Pressure Steam ran in the year 1808 the first steam locomotive to draw passengers." It was erected by "The Trevithick Centenary Memorial Committee".

In 1823 Charles Dickens (aged 11) lived at 4 Gower Street North when his mother opened a school there. The building was later re-numbered 147 Gower Street; the site was occupied from 2005 by the Accident and Emergency department of University College Hospital.

The Pre-Raphaelite Brotherhood was founded in the Millais family house on Gower Street in the winter of 1848–49.

Millicent Fawcett, a leading figure in the constitutional wing of the British women's suffrage movement, lived at No. 2 Gower Street (and died there in 1929).

The Walloon (Belgian) poet Henri Michaux briefly resided in Gower Street in February 1931.

From 1976 until 1995 the headquarters of MI5 was an anonymous grey office block at 140 Gower Street, adjacent to Euston Road. Since 2004 the site has been occupied by the western end of the Wellcome Trust's Gibbs Building.

Many of the Georgian houses on Gower Street have been converted into small hotels.

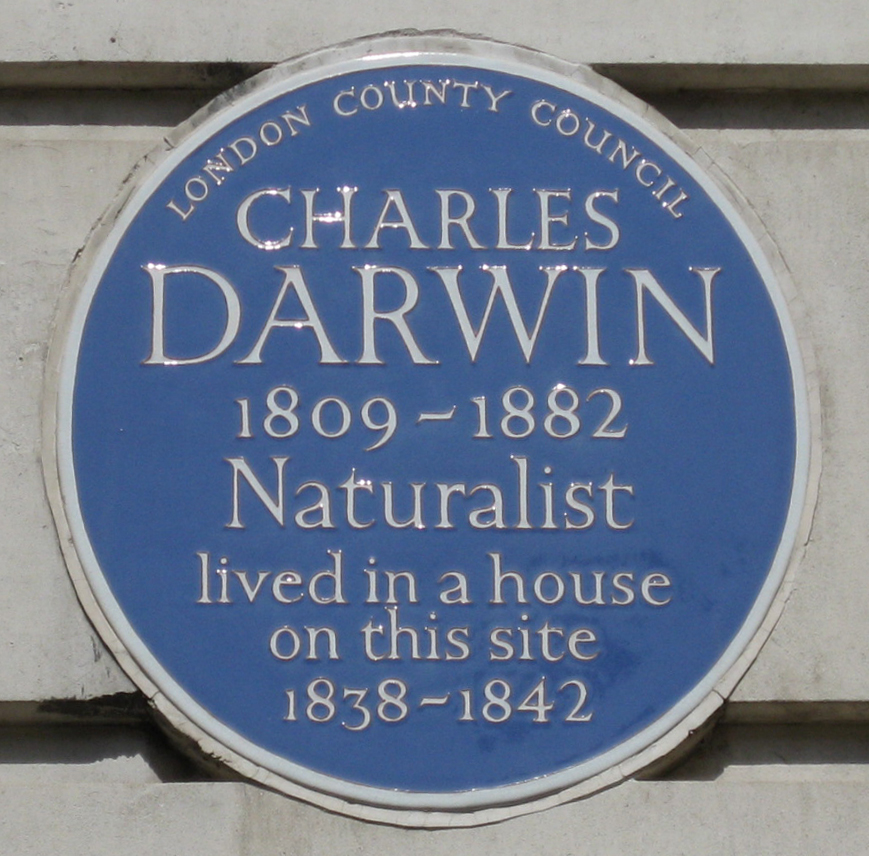
Charles Darwin plaque

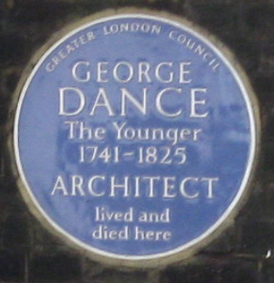
George Dance plaque

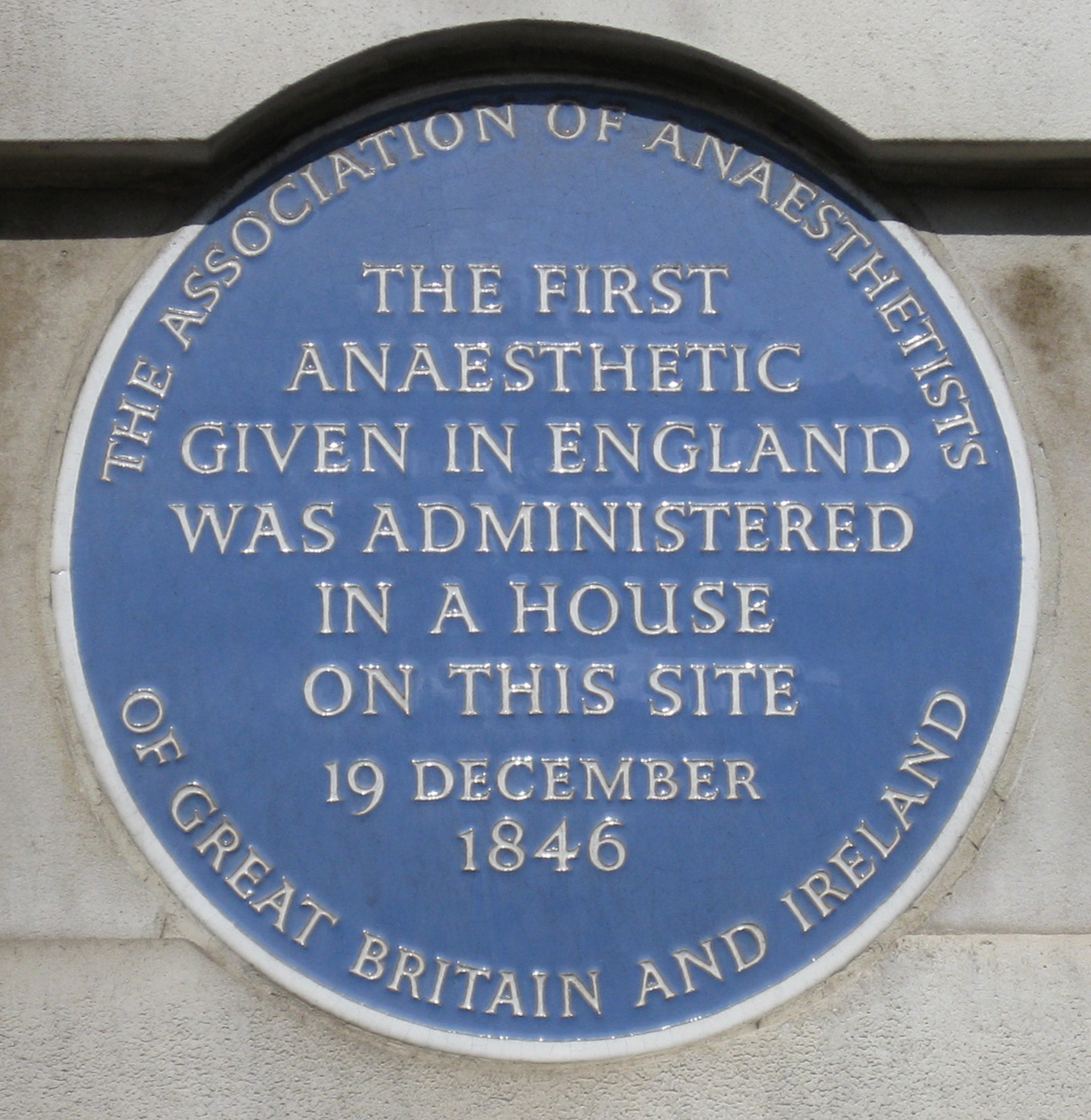
Plaque on Bonham-Carter House

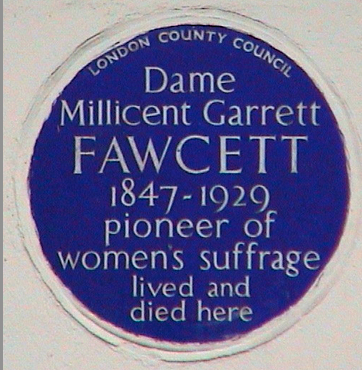
Millicent Garrett Fawcett plaque

== North Gower Street ==
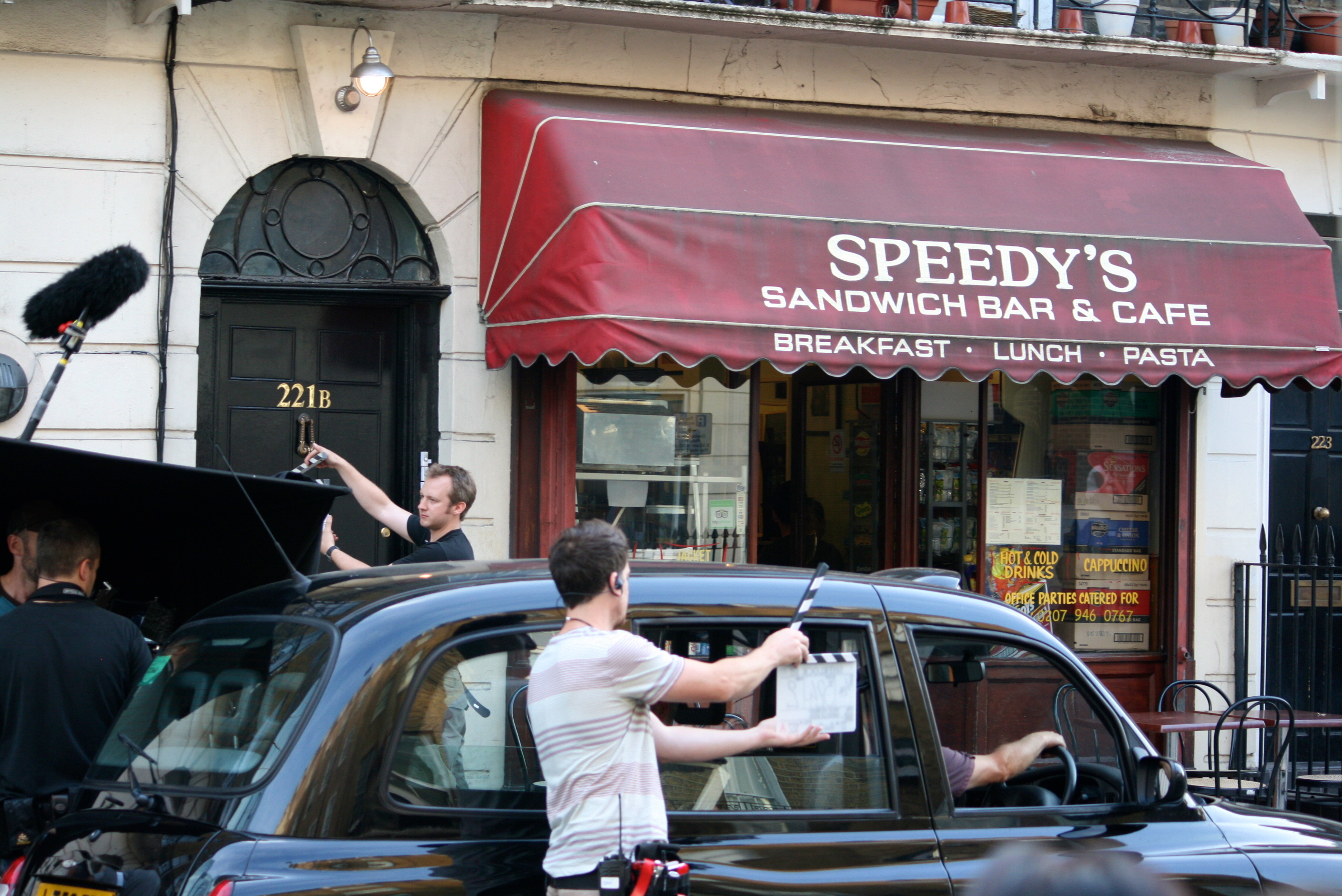
North Gower Street standing in for Baker Street during the filming of Sherlock

North Gower Street, the northern continuation of Gower Street beyond Euston Road, is not accessible from Gower Street at street level for vehicles or pedestrians. For pedestrians, the most direct access is via a subway along the concourse of Euston Square station.

From Euston Road, North Gower Street continues past Drummond Street and then ends, with a footpath continuing north to connect with the Hampstead Road. It is lined mostly with Georgian terraced houses now mostly converted into hotels and student accommodation or rebuilt, and council housing.

The BBC crime drama Sherlock has used 187 North Gower Street, posing as 221B Baker Street, for many external shots of Sherlock Holmes's flat. The location is instantly recognisable by the adjacent Speedy's cafe and sandwich shop which is also shown in most external shots in the series. The blue plaque for former resident Giuseppe Mazzini, clearly visible on Google Street View, is covered by a fake lamp for filming.

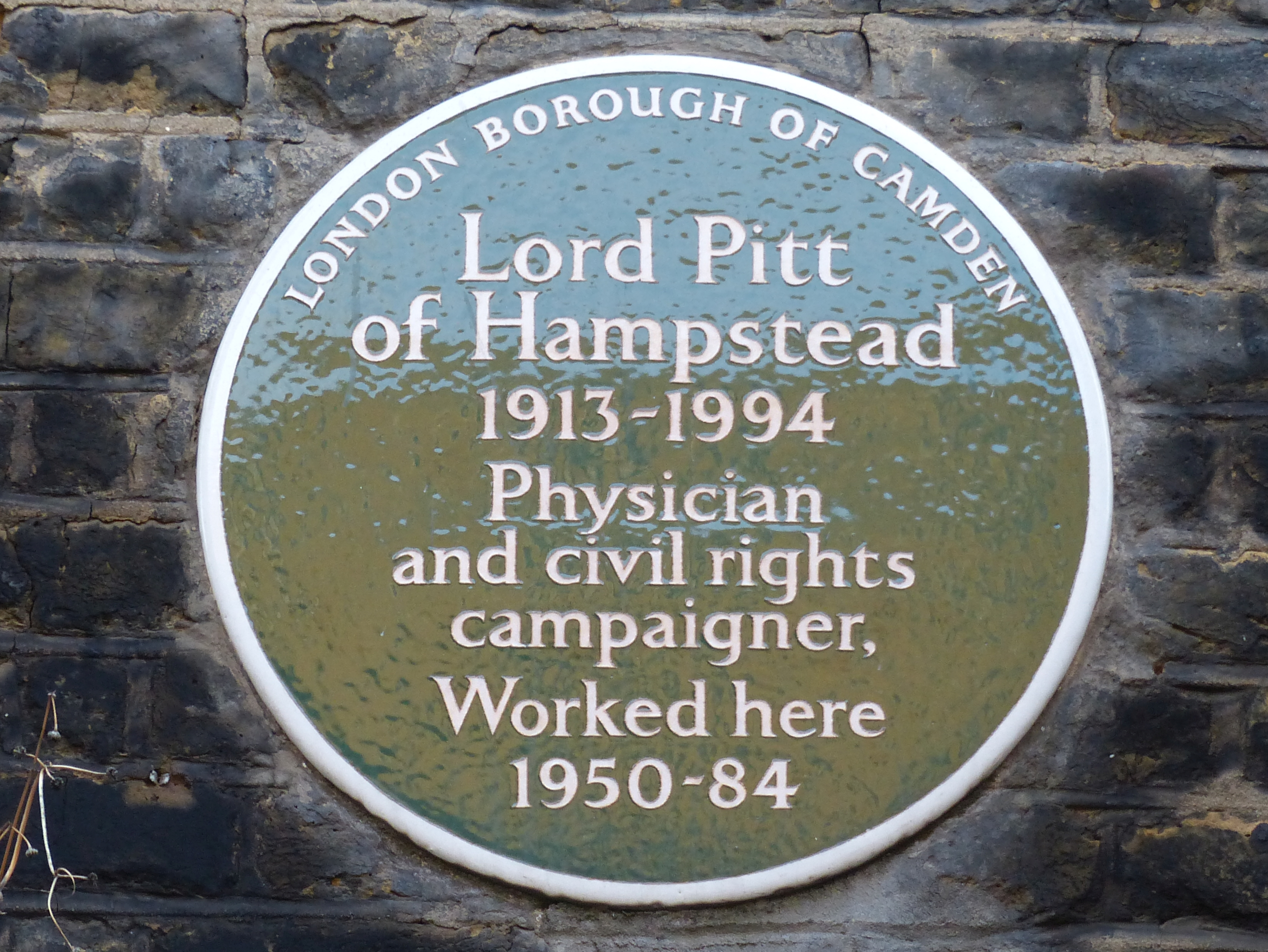

From 1950 to 1984, physician and civil rights campaigner David Pitt, Baron Pitt of Hampstead, worked as a doctor at 200 North Gower Street, where there is a commemorative plaque in his honour.

== See also ==
- Paternoster Row
