= A Dictionary of English Etymology =

- Author: Hensleigh Wedgwood
- Subject: English language
- Published: 1859 (Volume 1); 1862 (Volume 2); 1865 (Volume 3)
- Publisher: Trübner and Company
- Media type: Print
- OCLC: 801821
- Dewey Decimal: 422.03
- LC Class: PE1580

A Dictionary of English Etymology is an etymological dictionary of the English language written by Hensleigh Wedgwood and published by Trübner and Company in three volumes from 1859 to 1865 (vol. 1 1859, vol. 2 1862, vol. 3 1865), with a second edition published in 1871.

It was reviewed anonymously and by Herbert Coleridge.

The second volume was reviewed anonymously, by William Dwight Whitney, and by Eduard Müller and Henry Sweet.

Anatoly Liberman described Wedgewood as "the greatest authority on English etymology before Skeat"; Wedgewood's dictionary, however, has been superseded by the developments of historical linguistics in the second half 19th century.
