= Palra d'El Rebollal =

Romance dialect spoken in villages of Salamanca, Spain

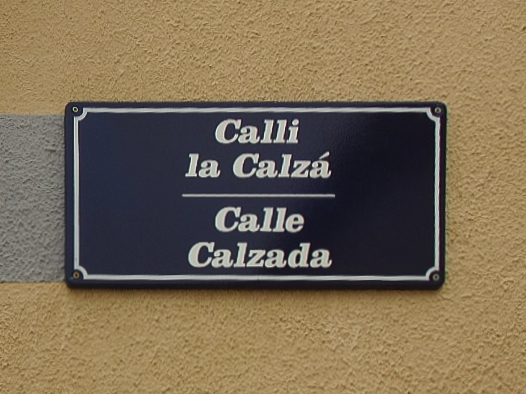
- Calli la Calzá, a street in Robleda, labelled in Palra and Spanish
- Native to: Spain
- Region: El Rebollar
- Language family: Indo-European: Italic; Latino-Faliscan; Latin; Romance; Italo-Western; Western; Ibero-Romance; West Iberian; Asturleonese; Eastern Astur-Leonese; Palra d'El Rebollal
- Early forms: Old Latin: Vulgar Latin; Proto-Romance; Old Leonese

Language codes
- ISO 639-3: –

Palra d'El Rebollal (Spanish: habla del Rebollar) is a dialect of Leonese or Extremaduran spoken in the subregion of El Rebollar, in Salamanca (Spain): Navasfrías (Navafrías), El Payo (Payu), Peñaparda (Peñaparda), Villasrubias (Villarrubias) and Robleda (Robrea).

Some authors calculate more speakers among the Rebollar emigrants in France than in the dialect original area.

== Characteristics ==
- Final vowels are closed in "-I" and "-U" (in Spanish the same final vowels are in "-E" and "-O"): "perru" (Spanish perro, English dog), "ríu" (Spanish río, English river), "verdi" (Spanish verde, English green),...
- Article is used with the possessive adjective. "La mi cassa" (Spanish Mi casa, English my house), "el mi dagal" (Spanish mi niño, English my child, my son),...
- Although most words exhibiting it are no longer used, a common plural ending was -is. Examples: las cucharis, las vaquis.

== Recognition ==
Some of the Rebollar villages have labelled streets and trekking routes in Spanish and Palra.

== See also ==
- José Benito Mateos Pascual
