= Alba de Yeltes =

- Municipality
- Coat of arms

- Location in Salamanca

- Location in Spain
- Coordinates: 40°40′16″N 6°19′07″W
- Country: Spain
- Autonomous community: Castile and León
- Province: Salamanca
- Comarca: Comarca de Ciudad Rodrigo
- Subcomarca: Campo del Yeltes

Government
  - Mayor: Gerardo Marcos (People's Party)

Area
  - Total: 22.4 km^{2} (8.6 sq mi)
- Elevation: 788 m (2,585 ft)

Population (2025-01-01)
  - Total: 205
  - Density: 9.15/km^{2} (23.7/sq mi)
- Time zone: UTC+1 (CET)
  - Summer (DST): UTC+2 (CEST)
- Postal code: 37478
- Website: www.albadeyeltes.es

Alba de Yeltes is a village and municipality in the province of Salamanca, western Spain, part of the autonomous community of Castile and León.

In 2016 the municipality had a population of 233. It has an area of 22 km^{2} (8.5 sq mi) and lies at 788 m (2,585 ft) above sea level.

The municipality is bordered on the north by Castraz, on the east by Aldehuela de Yeltes, on the south by Dios le Guarde, on the southwest by Tenebrón, on the west by Ciudad Rodrigo, and on the northwest by Sancti-Spíritus.
