= Combat of Aldea da Ponte =

1811 battle of the Peninsular War

Combat of Aldeia da Ponte
- Part of the Peninsular War
Date	27 September 1811
Location	Aldeia da Ponte, Portugal
Result	see Aftermath

Belligerents
United Kingdom; Kingdom of Portugal	(France) First French Empire

Commanders and leaders
(United Kingdom) Viscount Wellington (United Kingdom) Edward Pakenham (United Kingdom) John Slade (United Kingdom) Charles Alten	(France) Louis-Pierre Montbrun (France) Paul Thiébault (France) Pierre Watier (France) Joseph Souham

Units involved
(including 1st, 4th, 5th, 6th, 7th, Light Divisions; Portuguese Brigade; cavalry brigades)	(Thiébault and Souham's infantry; Montbrun and Wathier's cavalry)

Strength
~45,000 men	~11,000 men

Casualties and losses
100 total: 14 killed; 77 wounded; 9 missing; (Pakenham's brigade: 76, Portuguese: 13, Slade’s cavalry: 10, artillery: 1)	~150 total (estimated by Thiébault)

The combat of Aldea de Ponte was a rearguard action fought on 27 September 1811 during Wellington's retreat from Fuente Guinaldo to Alfayates in the aftermath of the Battle of El Boden.

== Background ==
By September 1811, Wellington had been blockading Ciadad Rodrigo. But by the end of the month, Marshal Marmont had raised at army of 58,000 men. On the night of 25 September, a detachment of 20,000 from Marmont's army moved towards Fuenteguinaldo, where Wellington had regrouped with his army after his retreat from El Boden and was being pursued by the French cavalry of General Louis-Piere Montbrun. On the night of the 25th, the 3rd and 4th Infantry Divisions, Pack's Portuguese Brigade, and Alten's, Slade's, and Grey's cavalry brigades, a total of 15,000 men, while Montbrun had a formidable force of around 60,000 men after being accompanied by the cavalry. Wellington's Light Division arrived at around the afternoon of the 26th, but it still was not enough to fight the French. He realised he could not win.

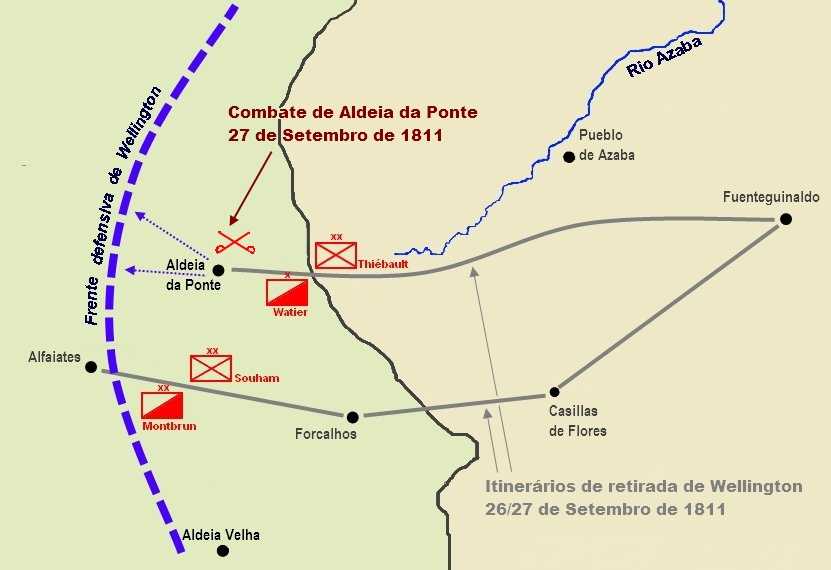
Diagram showing the retreat routes from Fuenteguinaldo, the Allied army's defense line, and the French units involved in the attacks on Aldeia da Ponte.

=== Prelude ===
On the 26th, Wellington and Marmont both had organised and placed their men. Though after studying the Wellington's formation, the French Marshal refused to attack, believing that Wellington never held a position which he could not defend, according to his previous defenses. By now, the French had changed their mind and ordered a retreat. Marmont started retiring slowly towards Ciudad Rodrigo; upon seeing this miscalculation, Wellington send the King's German Legion and the 1st Hussars on the Front to bluff the French into believing he could hold the position. The French had no intention to fight, and began the retreat shortly.

Upon gaining this opportunity, Wellington divided his army in two columns. One of them took the main road that passes through Casillas de Flores and Forcalhos, while the second left via a secondary route via Aldeia da Ponte. The Anglo-Portuguese retreat was noticed by the French a little after midnight. Marmont immediately ordered the cavalry of Montbrun and Watier, as well as the infantry divisions of Thiébault and Souham, still in the vicinity, to follow Wellington's army. With the rest of his troops still on the road to Ciudad Rodrigo, Marmont had no choice but to observe his opponent from a distance, because the two divisions he had at his disposal totalled only 11,000 men.

On the morning of 27 September, the British 1st, 5th, 6th, and 7th Divisions joined Wellington's main corps. The latter now had 45,000 men under his command, his front being covered by Alten, Slade, and de Grey with their respective cavalry brigades. The French forces, split into two columns, took the same routes used by the Allies during their retreat, with Montbrun and Souham on the main road and Watier and Thiébault in the direction of Aldeia da Ponte. Montbrun's column arrived at Alfaiates on 27 September at noon but was then confronted by the light division, the 5th division, and Alten's cavalry. For his part, stopped in his advance in front of Aldaia da Ponte by the outposts of the 4th Division and Slade's dragoons, Watier decided to wait for the arrival of Thiébault's division, as being the most senior general he had taken the command of all the French troops in area.

== The Battle ==
The village of Aldeia da Ponte became the point of contention between Wellington’s Anglo-Portuguese forces and Marshal Marmont’s French army. Positioned near the Allied defensive lines, the village offered excellent observation and road access. Wellington initially garrisoned it with light infantry from Pakenham’s brigade. French General Thiébault, recognizing its value, attacked with three battalions—one frontal and two flanking—forcing the British to withdraw. Wellington responded swiftly, deploying the full Pakenham brigade supported by two Portuguese battalions. The Allies recaptured the village. That evening, Montbrun and Souham reinforced Thiébault. Souham launched a night attack, but Wellington, avoiding night combat, chose not to reinforce or counterattack. Minor cavalry skirmishes followed, and Wellington withdrew overnight to stronger defensive positions. The Anglo-Portuguese army entrenched along an 11-kilometer front from Aldeia Velha to Rapoula bridge, with reserves near Alfaiates. When Marmont arrived, he found Wellington’s forces well-positioned in rugged terrain. Realizing that even a victory would not allow pursuit through the mountains, Marmont abandoned the attack and retreated toward Ciudad Rodrigo.

=== Aftermath ===
Wellington held his positions until 29 September before ordering his units to set up camp for the winter. He also took the opportunity to reoccupy his original location in Fuenteguinaldo. The French also took up their winter quarters, and Marmont, after separating from the Army of the North, established his army at Almaraz and Ávila. During the fighting at Aldeia da Ponte, the Allies lost 100 men (14 killed, 77 wounded, 9 missing). Pakenham's brigade had 76 men hors de combat, the Portuguese battalions on the flanks 13, Slade's cavalry 10, and the British artillery only one. For his part, Thiébault estimated his losses at 150 men.
