= Villar =

Villar may refer to:

== Places ==
=== France ===
- Villar-en-Val, a town in the Aude département

=== Italy ===
- Villar Dora, a town in the Metropolitan City of Turin
- Villar Focchiardo, a town in the Metropolitan City of Turin
- Villar Pellice, a town in the Metropolitan City of Turin
- Villar Perosa, a town in the Metropolitan City of Turin
- Villar San Costanzo, a town in the province of Cuneo

=== Spain ===
- Villar del Ala, a town in the province of Soria, Castile and León
- Villar de Argañán, a town in the province of Salamanca, Castile and León
- Villar del Arzobispo, a town in the comarca of Los Serranos in the Valencian Community
- Villar del Buey, a town in the province of Zamora, Castile and León
- Villar del Campo, a town in the province of Soria, Castile and León
- Villar de Cañas, a town in the province of Cuenca, Castile-La Mancha
- Villar de Ciervo, a town in the province of Salamanca, Castile and León
- Villar del Cobo, a town in the province of Teruel, Aragon
- Villar de Corneja, a town in the province of Ávila, Castile and León
- Villar de Domingo García, a town in the province of Cuenca, Castile-La Mancha
- Villar de la Encina, a town in the province of Cuenca, Castile-La Mancha
- Villar de Fallaves, a town in the province of Zamora, Castile and León
- Villar de Gallimazo, a town in the province of Salamanca, Castile and León
- Villar del Humo, a town in the province of Cuenca, Castile-La Mancha
- Villar del Infantado, a town in the province of Cuenca, Castile-La Mancha
- Villar de los Navarros, a town in the province of Zaragoza, Aragon
- Villar de Olalla, a town in the province of Cuenca, Castile-La Mancha
- Villar del Pedroso, a town in the province of Cáceres, Extremadura
- Villar de Peralonso, a town in the province of Salamanca, Castile and León
- Villar de Plasencia, a town in the province of Cáceres, Extremadura
- Villar del Pozo, a town in the province of Ciudad Real, Castile-La Mancha
- Villar de Rena, a town in the province of Badajoz, Extremadura
- Villar del Río, a town in the province of Soria, Castile and León
- Villar de Samaniego, a town in the province of Salamanca, Castile and León
- Villar del Salz, a town in the province of Teruel, Aragon
- Villar y Velasco, a town in the province of Cuenca, Castile-La Mancha
- Villar de la Yegua, a town in the province of Salamanca, Castile and León

== Other uses ==
- Villar (surname)
