= Puebla (disambiguation) =

Puebla is a Mexican state.

Puebla or La Puebla may also refer to:

== Places ==
=== Mexico ===
- Puebla (city), capital of Puebla state
  - Puebla (municipality)
- Puebla International Airport, Puebla
- Puebla metro station, in Mexico City

=== Spain ===
==== Andalusia ====
- La Puebla de Cazalla, province of Seville
- La Puebla de los Infantes, province of Seville
- La Puebla del Río, province of Seville
- Puebla de Don Fadrique, province of Granada
- Puebla de Guzmán, province of Huelva

==== Aragon ====
- La Puebla de Alfindén, province of Zaragoza
- La Puebla de Castro, province of Huesca
- La Puebla de Híjar, province of Teruel
- La Puebla de Valverde, province of Teruel
- Puebla de Albortón, province of Zaragoza

==== Castile and León ====
- La Puebla de Arganzón, province of Burgos
- La Puebla de los Infantes, province of Segovia
- La Puebla de Valdavia, province of Palencia
- Puebla de Azaba, province of Salamanca
- Puebla de Lillo, province of León
- Puebla de Pedraza, province of Segovia
- Puebla de San Medel, province of Salamanca
- Puebla de Sanabria, province of Zamora
- Puebla de Yeltes, province of Salamanca

==== Castilla-La Mancha ====
- La Puebla de Almoradiel, province of Toledo
- La Puebla de Montalbán, province of Toledo
- Puebla de Almenara, province of Cuenca
- Puebla de Beleña, province of Guadalajara
- Puebla de Don Rodrigo, province of Ciudad Real
- Puebla de Valles, province of Guadalajara
- Puebla del Príncipe, province of Ciudad Real
- Puebla del Salvador, province of Cuenca

==== Extremadura ====
- Puebla de Alcocer, province of Badajoz
- Puebla de la Calzada, province of Badajoz
- Puebla de la Reina, province of Badajoz
- Puebla de Obando, province of Badajoz
- Puebla de Sancho Pérez, province of Badajoz
- Puebla del Maestre, province of Badajoz
- Puebla del Prior, province of Badajoz

==== Community of Madrid ====
- Puebla de la Sierra

==== Valencian Community ====
- Puebla de Arenoso, province of Castellón
- Puebla de San Miguel, province of Valencia

=== United States ===
- La Puebla, New Mexico

== People ==
- Carlos Puebla (1917–1989), a Cuban singer, guitarist, and composer.
- Teté Puebla (b. 1940), a former Cuban guerilla fighter

== Other uses ==
- Club Puebla, a Mexican professional football club
- "Puebla", a song by Álvaro Soler from Mar de colores, 2017
- Puebla (moth), a moth genus
- Puebla frog, a species of frog

== See also ==
- Battle of Puebla, 5 May 1862
