= Boada =

Boada may refer to:

== People ==
- Joan Boada, Cuban ballet dancer
- Lucas Boada, Cuban baseball player

== Places ==
- Boada de Campos, a municipality in the province of Palencia, Castile and León, Spain
- Boada de Villadiego, a village in Burgos province, Spain
- Boada, Salamanca, a municipality in Salamanca province, Spain

== See also ==
- Boado, Ourense, a place near Xinzo de Limia, Ourense province, Spain
