= Comarca de Ciudad Rodrigo =

- Comarca
- Nickname: Tierra de Ciudad Rodrigo
- Location in Salamanca
- Country: Spain
- Autonomous community: Castile and León
- Province: Salamanca

Area
  - Total: 2,797.6 km^{2} (1,080.2 sq mi)

Population (2017)
  - Total: 26,576
  - Density: 9.4996/km^{2} (24.604/sq mi)
- Time zone: UTC+1 (CET)
  - Summer (DST): UTC+2 (CEST)

Comarca de Ciudad Rodrigo is a large comarca in the province of Salamanca, Castile and León, Spain. It contains the following subcomarcas:

- Ciudad Rodrigo, which is a small city and large municipality.
- Campo de Argañán which contains the municipalities of Aldea del Obispo, Campillo de Azaba, Carpio de Azaba, Castillejo de Martín Viejo, Espeja, Fuentes de Oñoro, Gallegos de Argañán, Ituero de Azaba, La Alameda de Gardón, La Alamedilla, La Alberguería de Argañán, La Bouza, Puebla de Azaba, Puerto Seguro, Saelices el Chico, Villar de Argañán, Villar de Ciervo and Villar de la Yegua.
- Campo del Yeltes, which contains the municipalities of Abusejo, Alba de Yeltes, Aldehuela de Yeltes, Boada, Cabrillas, Castraz, Dios le Guarde, La Fuente de San Esteban, Martín de Yeltes, Morasverdes, Puebla de Yeltes, Retortillo, Sancti-Spíritus, Sepulcro-Hilario and Tenebrón.
- Los Agadones, which contains the municipalities of Agallas, Herguijuela, La Atalaya, Martiago, Monsagro, El Sahugo, Serradilla del Arroyo, Serradilla del Llano and Zamarra.
- Campo de Robledo, which contains the municipalities of El Bodón, Casillas de Flores, La Encina, Fuenteguinaldo and Pastores.
- El Rebollar, which contains the municipalities of El Payo, Navasfrías, Peñaparda, Robleda and Villasrubias.
