= Campillo de Azaba =

- Municipality
- Flag Coat of arms

- Location in Salamanca

- Location in Spain
- Coordinates: 40°31′N 6°41′W
- Country: Spain
- Autonomous community: Castile and León
- Province: Salamanca
- Comarca: Comarca de Ciudad Rodrigo
- Subcomarca: Campo de Argañán

Government
  - Mayor: Julián Fandiño Iglesias (People's Party)

Area
  - Total: 26 km^{2} (10 sq mi)
- Elevation: 660 m (2,170 ft)

Population (2025-01-01)
  - Total: 146
  - Density: 5.6/km^{2} (15/sq mi)
- Time zone: UTC+1 (CET)
  - Summer (DST): UTC+2 (CEST)
- Postal code: 37550

Campillo de Azaba is a village and municipality in the province of Salamanca, western Spain, part of the autonomous community of Castile-Leon. It is 106 kilometres (66 mi) from the provincial capital city of Salamanca and has a population of 169 people. The municipality covers an area of 26 km^{2} (10 sq mi) and it lies 660 metres (2,170 ft) above sea level.

The postal code is 37550.
