= Extremaduran language =

Romance language spoken in Spain

Extremaduran
- estremeñu
- Native to: Spain
- Region: Extremadura; Castile and León (southern Salamanca province)
- Ethnicity: Extremadurans: 1.1 million (1994)
- Native speakers: (200,000 cited 1994)
- Language family: Indo-European: Italic; Latino-Faliscan; Latin; Romance; Italo-Western; Western Romance; Gallo-Iberian; Ibero-Romance; West Iberian; Asturleonese; Extremaduran
- Early forms: Old Latin: Vulgar Latin; Proto-Romance; Old Leonese (possibly)
- Dialects: Chinato†

Official status
- Recognised minority language in: Extremadura (Spain)

Language codes
- ISO 639-3: ext
- Glottolog: extr1243

An Extremaduran speaker, recorded in the Netherlands.

Extremaduran (Extremaduran: estremeñu [ehtːɾeˈmeɲʊ], Spanish: extremeño) is a Western Romance language with some traits in common with the Asturleonese language, spoken primarily in northwestern Extremadura and adjacent villages in the province of Salamanca. Its northern varieties are generally considered a distinct language, while central and southern varieties are regarded as transitional dialects toward standard Spanish.

== Dialects ==
The linguistic varieties of Extremadura are usually classified in three main branches: Northern or "High" (artu estremeñu), Central or "Middle" (meyu estremeñu), and Southern or "Low" (baju estremeñu). The northern branch is usually considered to be the language proper, and is spoken in the north-west of the autonomous region of Extremadura, and the south-west of Salamanca, a province of the autonomous region of Castile and León. The central and southern branches are spoken in the rest of Extremadura, and are not different enough from standard Spanish to be considered anything but dialects of the language, since at least the 18th century.

Northern Extremaduran is also spoken in a few villages of southern Salamanca, being known there as the "palra d'El Rebollal", which is now almost extinct.

== History ==
The late 19th century saw the first serious attempt to write in Extremaduran, until then an oral language, with the poet José María Gabriel y Galán. Born in Salamanca, he lived most of his life in the north of Cáceres, Extremadura. He wrote in a local variant of Extremaduran, full of dialectal remnants, but always with an eye on Spanish usage.

Throughout the 20th century, revival efforts focused on documenting local vernacular forms. By the early 21st century, only a small community of activists advocated for co-official status of Northern Extremaduran, while regional authorities have not implemented legal protections beyond recognizing Extremaduran as part of the broader Spanish linguistic heritage.

There are also attempts to transform the southern Castilian dialects ("castúo", as some people named them, using the word which appeared in Luis Chamizo Trigueros's poems) into a language. Advocacy for codifying southern Castilian dialects under the label ‘Extremaduran’ has heightened tensions over linguistic identity, contributing to regional government decisions against granting co-official status to Northern Extremaduran. It is in serious danger of extinction, with only the oldest people speaking it at present, while most of the Extremaduran population cannot speak the language, since the majority of Extremadurans, and even its own speakers, regard it as poorly spoken Spanish.

In 2013, the people of Serradilla created the first feature film in Extremaduran, Territoriu de bandolerus. In late 2024, Extremaduran and Oliventine Portuguese received legal recognition from the Regional Government of Extremadura.

== Phonology ==
- Features related to Astur-Leonese:
  - Post-tonic o becomes u, e.g. oru [ˈoɾu] 'gold'.
  - Post-tonic e becomes i, e.g. calli [ˈkaʎi] or [ˈkaʝi] 'street'.
  - Latin word-final e, chiefly after d, is not lost, e.g. redi [ˈreði] 'net'.
  - Some cases of palatalization of word-initial n, e.g. ñíu [ˈɲiu] 'nest'.
  - Conservation of the consonantic group mb in intermediate position, e.g. lambel [lamˈbel] 'to lick'.
  - Frequent conservation of word-initial [h] derived from a Latin f-. This consonant is lost in most Spanish varieties, but is common with much of Andalusia, e.g. higu [ˈhiɣu] 'fig'.
  - Occasional conservation of word-initial f, e.g. fogal [foˈɣal] 'home, hearth'.
- Features related to southern peninsular Spanish:
  - General loss of intervocalic d, e.g. mieu [ˈmjeu] 'fear'.
  - Debuccalization of post-vocalic /s/, /ks/ and /θ/ into [h] (s-aspiration), e.g. estal [ɛhtˈtal] 'to be'.
- Other features:
  - Infinitives in -l, e.g. dil [ˈdil] 'to go'.
  - Metathesis of the consonant cluster rl into lr, e.g. chalral [tʃalˈral] 'to talk'.
  - Occasional interchange of the liquid consonants l/r, e.g. craru [ˈkɾaɾu] 'clear'.
  - Preservation of some old voiced fricatives, such as some instances of [ð] corresponding to [z] in Portuguese or [θ] corresponding to [s] in Portuguese (both corresponding to /θ/ in Spanish). This feature is an archaism preserved from Old Spanish or Old Astur-Leonese, as it happens only when it is etymologically justified. When a voiced fricative appears, one also does in languages such as Catalan or Portuguese: Extremaduran tristeza [tɾihtˈteða] 'sadness' (still voiced in Portuguese tristeza [tɾiʃˈtezɐ], voice lost in Spanish tristeza [tɾisˈteθa]), but Extremaduran cabeça [kaˈβeθa] 'head' (voiceless also in Portuguese cabeça [kɐˈβesɐ], Spanish cabeza [kaˈβeθa]). The feature is dying out quite fast but is found all over the High Extremaduran speaking area.

== Morphology ==
- Anteposition of the article before the possessive pronoun, as in Old Spanish or in many Romance languages such as Leonese, Portuguese, Catalan or Italian.
- Anteposition of the particle lu (or lo), in some interrogative sentences.
- Use of diminutives inu and ina, as heritage from Leonese (as in Portuguese).
- Occasional formation of gerund, derived from a form of the verb in past tense.
- Usage of a vocative-exclamative case. When nouns are in the vocative, the closing of post-tonic vowels (e into i and o into u) disappears and those vowels open. El Ramiru quíi venil (Ramiro wants to come), but Ramiro, ven pacá (Ramiro, come here!). Sé quién lo vidu, Pepi (I know who saw it, Pepe did), but Sé quién lo vidu, Pepe (I know who saw it, Pepe). This is a characteristic shared with the Fala language. Extremaduran and the Fala language are actually the only western Romance languages with a distinct form of vocative case for nouns formed with a change in the ending.
- Usage of the preposition a with the verbs andal and estal indicating static temporal location, contrasting with the usage of en. Está a Caçris "He's at Cáceres (for a few days)", Está en Caçris "He's in Cáceres", Está pa Caçris "He's around Cáceres".
- A very frequent usage of deictic forms to which enclitic pronouns can be added at the end. They can be used in the middle of a sentence: Velaquí la mi casa (Here is my house), velallilu (there he is), Paquí se curtivan velaquí lechugas, millu... (Look, lettuce, corn and so on is grown here).
- Usage of reduplicated forms of plural pronouns with a reciprocal sense (ellus y ellus, vujotrus y vujotrus...): Estaban brucheandu ellus y ellus: They were wrestling with each other.

== Vocabulary ==
- Usage of terms considered in Spanish as archaisms: ludia (Spanish levadura, "yeast").
- Presence of common terms from Andalusian Arabic: zagal (from Andalusian Arabic zaḡál, "boy").

== Comparative tables ==
Latin	Italian	Romanian	Catalan	Gascon	Aragonese	Spanish	Judezmo	Portuguese	Galician	Extremaduran	Leonese	English
altus	alto	(în)alt	alt	haut	alto	alto	alto	alto	alto	artu	altu	high/tall
quasi	quasi	(aproape)	quasi	quasi	cuasi	casi	kaji	quase	case	cuasi, ábati	cuasi	almost
dicere	dire	zice	dir	díser	decir	decir [deˈθir]	dizir	dizer	dicir	izil [iˈðil]	dicire	to say
facere	fare	face	fer	har	fer	hacer [aˈθer]	(f)azer	fazer	facer	hazel [haˈðel]	facere	to do
focus	fuoco	foc	foc	huec	fuego	fuego	fuego, huego	fogo	fogo	hueu	fueu	fire
flamma	fiamma	flamă	flama	ehlama	flama	llama	yama	chama	chama	flama	chama	flame
legere	leggere	(citi)	llegir	léger	leyer	leer	meldar	ler	ler	leyel	lliere	to read
lingua	lingua	limbă	llengua	lengua	luenga	lengua	elguenga	língua	lingua	luenga/léngua	llingua	tongue
lumbum	lombo	((zona) lombară)	llom	lom	lomo	lomo	lombo	lombo	lombo	lombu	llombu	loin
mater	madre	mamă	mare	mair	mai	madre	madre	mãe	nai	mairi	mai	mother
merula	merlo	mierlă	merla	mèrlo	merla	mirlo		melro	merlo	mielra	mielru	blackbird
monstrare	mostrare	mustra	mostrar	muishar	amostrar	mostrar	amostrar	mostrar	mostrar	muestral	amuesare	to show
noster	nostro	nostru	nostre	noste	nuestro	nuestro	muestro, muesho	nosso	noso	muestru/nuestru	nuesu	ours
tussis	tosse	tuse	tos	tos	tos	tos	toz	tosse	tose	tossi	tose	cough

* The words in this table refer only to High Extremaduran.

** Extremaduran words in this table are spelled according to Ismael Carmona García's orthography.

== Literature ==
The language of Extremadura began to appear in documentation from the 13th century. In the 17th century, texts in the Talaveran subdialect appeared (1638). Extremaduran began to have more presence in literature with Vicente Barrantes and his Días sin sol of 1875.

In 1984, José María Alcón Olivera published Requilorios, the first novel written in Extremaduran. It was not until the 2000s that new publications in Extremaduran were seen, in this case, in the El Rebollar variant, with El corral los mis agüelus, by José Benito Mateos Pascual. This was followed by the Primera Antología de Poesía Extremeña in 2005. In 2011, La nueva literatura en estremeñu was published, followed in 2012 by a second part.

In 2012, Ismael Carmona García published the poetry collection Pan i verea. The siblings Miguel Herrero Uceda and Elisa Herrero Uceda published two books of short stories in Extremaduran: one in 2012, entitled Ceborrincho, relatos extremeños, and another in 2015, entitled Mamaeña, relatos extremeños. Other books in subsequent years include La huélliga by Marcos Cruz Díaz and El sol del lobu by Aníbal Martín. In 2025, Vicente Costalago published Euris estremeñus i sotras poemas, divided into three parts: the first with epic poems about various Extremaduran heroes; the second with religious poems; and the last with individual poems. In November of the same year, he also published Estórias estremeñas, a collection of three short stories, two of which are inspired by the mythology of Extremadura and the third by the peasant revolt of Extremadura.

== Organizations ==
There is a regional organization in Extremadura, OSCEC Estremaúra, that tries to defend the language, one journal (Belsana) and one cultural newspaper, Iventia, written in the new unified Extremaduran and the old dialect "palra d'El Rebollal".

== Textual example ==
Portuguese	Galician	Leonese	Asturian	Extremaduran	Spanish	Ladino	English	Catalan	Cantabrian	Aragonese	Mirandese
O estremenho é uma língua falada no noroeste da comunidade autónoma da Estremadura.	O estremeño é unha lingua falada no noroeste da comunidade autónoma de Estremadura.	L'estremennu yía una llingua falada nel noruesti la comunidá autónoma Estremadura.	L'estremeñu ye una llingua falada nel noroeste de la comunidá autónoma d'Estremadura.	El estremeñu es una luenga palrá nel noroesti de la comuniá autónoma d'Estremaúra.	El extremeño es una lengua hablada en el noroeste de la comunidad autónoma de Extremadura.	El ekstremadurano es una lingua favlada en el noroeste d'la komunitate autonoma d'Ekstremadura.	Extremaduran is a language spoken in the northwest of the autonomous community of Extremadura.	L'extremeny és una llengua parlada al nord-oest de la comunitat autònoma d'Extremadura.	L'Extremaduran ye una llingua que se habla nel noroeste de la comunidá autónoma d'Extremadura.	L'extremaduran ye una llingua que se parla en o noroeste de l'autonomía d'Extremadura.	L stremenho ye ũa lhéngua falada ne l noroeste de la quemunidade outónoma de Stremadura.

== Writers ==
- José María Gabriel y Galán
- Miguel Herrero Uceda
- Elisa Herrero Uceda

== See also ==
- Chinato
- Ramón Menéndez Pidal
