= El Bodón =

- Municipality
- Coat of arms

- Location in Salamanca

- Location in Spain
- Coordinates: 40°29′N 6°34′W
- Country: Spain
- Autonomous community: Castile and León
- Province: Salamanca
- Comarca: Comarca de Ciudad Rodrigo
- Subcomarca: Campo de Robledo

Government
  - Mayor: Juan José Oreja Sánchez (PSOE)

Area
  - Total: 61 km^{2} (24 sq mi)
- Elevation: 701 m (2,300 ft)

Population (2025-01-01)
  - Total: 247
  - Density: 4.0/km^{2} (10/sq mi)
- Time zone: UTC+1 (CET)
  - Summer (DST): UTC+2 (CEST)
- Postal code: 37520

El Bodón is a village and large municipality in the province of Salamanca, western Spain, part of the autonomous community of Castile-Leon. It is located 100 kilometres (62 mi) from the provincial capital city of Salamanca and has a population of 293 people.

== Geography ==
The municipality covers an area of 60.74 square kilometres (23.45 sq mi). It lies 701 metres (2,300 ft) above sea level. The postal code is 37520. The tour of the area is described by the English travel writer Richard Ford.

== History ==
During the Peninsular War, the village was the site of the Battle of El Bodón which was fought on 25 September 1811 between the French army and Anglo-Portuguese army under Thomas Picton.
