= Sancti-Spíritus, Salamanca =

Sancti-Spíritus
- Municipality
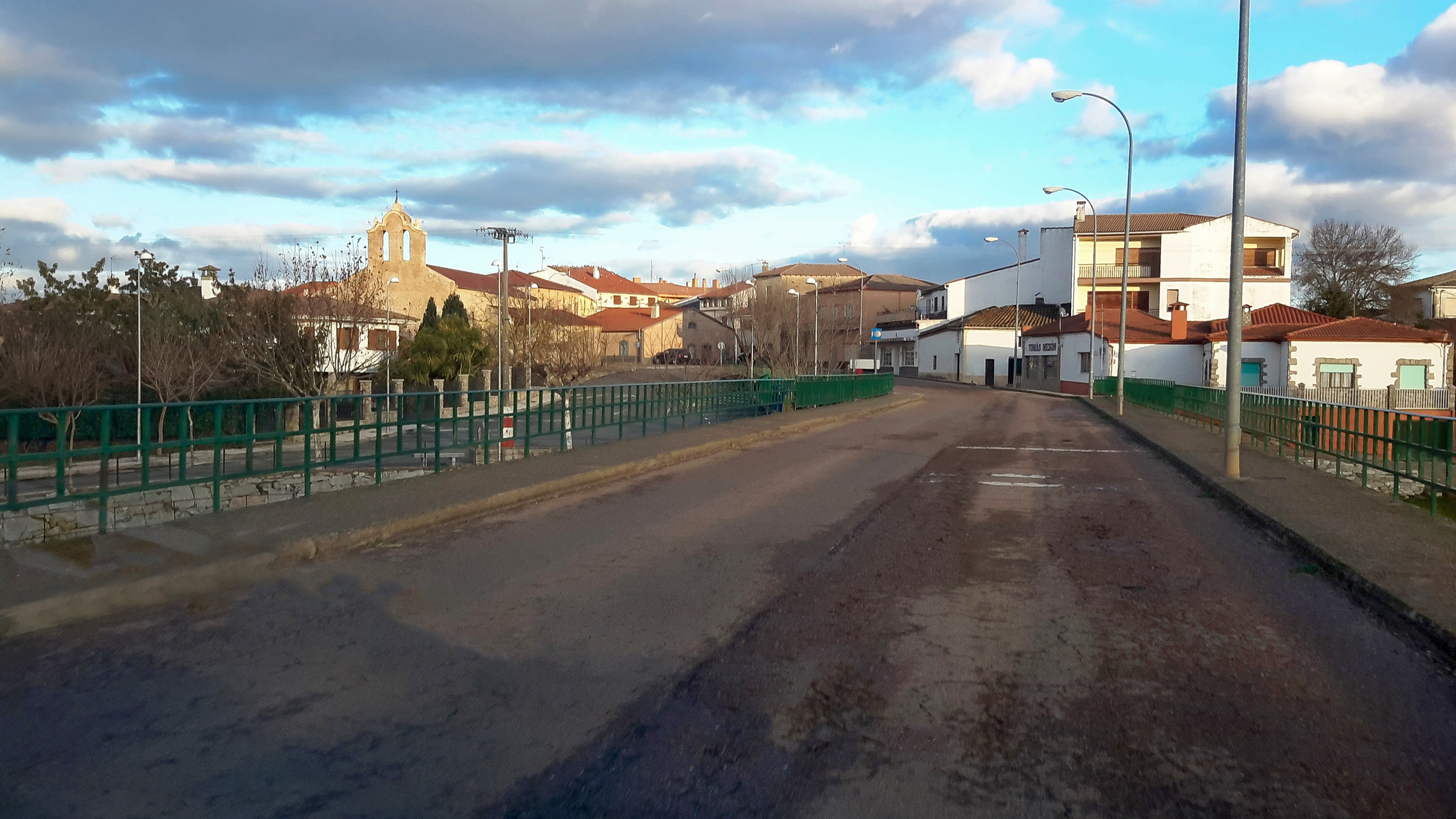

- Coat of arms

- Location in Salamanca

- Location within Spain
- Coordinates: 40°42′19″N 6°24′03″W
- Country: Spain
- Autonomous Community: Castile and León
- Province: Salamanca
- Comarca: Comarca de Ciudad Rodrigo
- Subcomarca: Campo del Yeltes

Government
  - Type: Mayor–council
  - Body: Ayuntamiento de Sancti-Spíritus
  - Mayor: Bienvenido Garduño Sánchez (PP)

Area
  - Total: 142 km^{2} (55 sq mi)
- Elevation: 756 m (2,480 ft)

Population (2025-01-01)
  - Total: 713
  - Density: 5.02/km^{2} (13.0/sq mi)
- Time zone: UTC+1 (CET)
  - Summer (DST): UTC+2 (CEST)
- Postcode: 37470
- Website: www.ayto-sanctispiritus.com

Sancti-Spiritus is a municipality in the province of Salamanca, in the autonomous community of Castile-Leon, Spain. It is 70 km away from Salamanca, the capital of the province. It is situated 756 m above the sea level.

The area of the municipality is 142 km^{2} and it ranks 4th among the municipalities in the provinces of Salamanca after Ciudad Rodrigo, Castillejo de Martín Viejo, and Ledesma.

As of 2016 its population is 854 inhabitants and the postal code 37470.
