= Gallegos de Argañán =

- Municipality
- Coat of arms

- Location in Salamanca
- Coordinates: 40°37′52″N 6°42′17″W
- Country: Spain
- Autonomous community: Castile and León
- Province: Salamanca
- Comarca: Comarca de Ciudad Rodrigo
- Subcomarca: Campo de Argañán

Government
  - Mayor: José Serafin Bajo Arroyo (People's Party)

Area
  - Total: 47 km^{2} (18 sq mi)
- Elevation: 664 m (2,178 ft)

Population (2025-01-01)
  - Total: 259
  - Density: 5.5/km^{2} (14/sq mi)
- Time zone: UTC+1 (CET)
  - Summer (DST): UTC+2 (CEST)
- Postal code: 37497

Gallegos de Argañán is a village and municipality in the province of Salamanca, western Spain, part of the autonomous community of Castile-Leon. It is located 113 kilometres (70 mi) from the provincial capital city of Salamanca and has a population of 293 people.

== Geography ==
The municipality covers an area of 47 km^{2} (18 sq mi). It lies 664 metres (2,178 ft) above sea level and the postal code is 37484.

== See also ==
- List of municipalities in Salamanca
