= El Rebollar (Salamanca) =

- Comarca
- Location in Salamanca
- Country: Spain
- Autonomous community: Castile and León
- Province: Salamanca
- Comarca: Comarca de Ciudad Rodrigo

Area
  - Total: 302.43 km^{2} (116.77 sq mi)

Population (2006)
  - Total: 2,300
  - Density: 7.6/km^{2} (20/sq mi)
- Time zone: UTC+1 (CET)
  - Summer (DST): CEST

El Rebollar is a subcomarca of Comarca de Ciudad Rodrigo in the province of Salamanca, Castile and León. It contains five municipalities: El Payo, Navasfrías, Peñaparda, Robleda and Villasrubias. The Palra d'El Rebollal, an Asturleonese dialect, is spoken in the area.
