= Serradilla del Arroyo =

- Municipality
- Coat of arms

- Location in Salamanca
- Coordinates: 40°31′17″N 6°21′36″W
- Country: Spain
- Autonomous community: Castile and León
- Province: Salamanca
- Comarca: Comarca de Ciudad Rodrigo
- Subcomarca: Los Agadones

Government
  - Mayor: Manuel Montero Rodríguez (PSOE)

Area
  - Total: 81 km^{2} (31 sq mi)
- Elevation: 863 m (2,831 ft)

Population (2025-01-01)
  - Total: 239
  - Density: 3.0/km^{2} (7.6/sq mi)
- Time zone: UTC+1 (CET)
  - Summer (DST): UTC+2 (CEST)
- Postal code: 37531

Serradilla del Arroyo (Spanish pronunciation: [seraˈðiʎa ðel aˈroʝo]) is a municipality located in the province of Salamanca, Castile and León, Spain. As of 2016 the municipality has a population of 275 inhabitants.
