= El Sahugo =

- Municipality
- Coat of arms

- Location in Salamanca
- Coordinates: 40°24′51″N 6°32′39″W
- Country: Spain
- Autonomous community: Castile and León
- Province: Salamanca
- Comarca: Comarca de Ciudad Rodrigo
- Subcomarca: Los Agadones

Government
  - Mayor: Agustín Tome Oreja (People's Party)

Area
  - Total: 59 km^{2} (23 sq mi)
- Elevation: 823 m (2,700 ft)

Population (2025-01-01)
  - Total: 178
  - Density: 3.0/km^{2} (7.8/sq mi)
- Time zone: UTC+1 (CET)
  - Summer (DST): UTC+2 (CEST)
- Postal code: 37510

El Sahugo is a village and municipality in the province of Salamanca, western Spain, part of the autonomous community of Castile-Leon. It is located 109 kilometres (68 mi) from the provincial capital city of Salamanca and has a population of 196 people as of 2016.

== Geography ==
The municipality covers an area of 59 km^{2} (23 sq mi). It lies 823 metres (2,700 ft) above sea level and the postal code is 37514.

== Economy ==
- The basis of the economy is agriculture.

== See also ==
- List of municipalities in Salamanca
