= Campo del Yeltes =

- Comarca
- Interactive map of Campo del Yeltes
- Country: Spain
- Autonomous community: Castile and León
- Province: Salamanca
- Comarca: Comarca de Ciudad Rodrigo

Area
  - Total: 714.53 km^{2} (275.88 sq mi)

Population (2010)
  - Total: 5,709
  - Density: 7.990/km^{2} (20.69/sq mi)
- Time zone: UTC+1 (CET)
  - Summer (DST): CEST

Campo del Yeltes is a subcomarca in the comarca of Comarca de Ciudad Rodrigo in the province of Salamanca, Castile and León. It contains 15 municipalities: Abusejo, Alba de Yeltes, Aldehuela de Yeltes, Boada, Cabrillas, Castraz, Dios le Guarde, La Fuente de San Esteban, Martín de Yeltes, Morasverdes, Puebla de Yeltes, Retortillo, Sancti-Spíritus, Sepulcro-Hilario and Tenebrón.
