= Chinato dialect =

Dialect of the Extremaduran language

Chinato
- Chinato
- Native to: Spain
- Region: Malpartida de Plasencia
- Extinct: by 1995
- Language family: Indo-European: Italic; Latino-Faliscan; Latin; Romance; Italo-Western; Western Romance; Gallo-Iberian; Ibero-Romance; West Iberian; Asturleonese or Castilian; Extremaduran; Chinato
- Early forms: Old Latin: Vulgar Latin; Proto-Romance; Old Spanish/Old Leonese (possibly)

Language codes
- ISO 639-3: –
- Glottolog: None

Chinato was a dialect of Extremaduran spoken in Malpartida de Plasencia. It is now extinct.

== Speech research ==
The humanist Gonzalo Correas Íñigo was the first to deal with Chinato in his Ortografía kastellana nueva i perfecta and it was not until the 20th century that Diego Catalán, in the Revista de Dialectología y Tradiciones Populares, studied the most outstanding features of the speech using scientific criteria.

Manuel Ariza Viguera wrote in the 1990s: “While the Serradilla dialect is still alive, the Malpartida de Plasencia dialect lost its vitality in the 1940s and today [that is, before 1995] nobody speaks the dialect, although the oldest residents remember what was said before. [...] We couldn't find any speakers of the old dialect in Malpartida.”

Since 2007, there has been an association called the Asociación de Amigos del Habla Chinata, which published El habla de los chinatos, a book that compiles more than 3000 expressions and vocabulary of the linguistic variety.

== Linguistic description ==
The voiced s evolves into a fricative d: roda (rosa), bedo (beso), lod ihoh (los hijos). It maintains the primitive distinction between the voiceless and voiced pairs -s y -ss-, -ç y z of Old Spanish (they do not distinguish between x and j,g ). It aspirates the final -s, transcribed as j (examples: laj, codaj, amigaj, baylej, mozoj, armodamoj, poj) or at the end of a syllable: uijtej, dijparcila, obijpo... This aspiration of the -s "is common only in some towns in the eastern part of the province of Cáceres: Malpartida, Serradilla, Fresnedoso." Loses the -d-: ruillaj, puean, puemoj... The -r at the end of a word evolves to -l: aprendel, codel (coser), zalil (salir)...

== Bibliography ==
- Catalán, Diego (1954). Concepto lingüístico del dialecto "chinato" en una chinato-hablante (in Spanish). Biblioteca virtual extrema.
- Lapesa, Rafael (1959). Historia de la Lengua Española (in Spanish).
- Macedonio Espinosa, Aurelio (1935). Arcaísmos dialectales (in Spanish).
