= Morasverdes =

- Municipality
- Coat of arms

- Location in Salamanca
- Coordinates: 40°36′6″N 6°16′32″W
- Country: Spain
- Autonomous community: Castile and León
- Province: Salamanca
- Comarca: Comarca de Ciudad Rodrigo
- Subcomarca: Campo del Yeltes

Government
  - Mayor: Alejandro García Saturio (PSOE)

Area
  - Total: 52 km^{2} (20 sq mi)
- Elevation: 895 m (2,936 ft)

Population (2025-01-01)
  - Total: 230
  - Density: 4.4/km^{2} (11/sq mi)
- Time zone: UTC+1 (CET)
  - Summer (DST): UTC+2 (CEST)
- Postal code: 37590

Morasverdes is a municipality located in the province of Salamanca, Castile and León, Spain. As of 2016, the municipality has a population of 274 inhabitants.
