= Martiago =

- Municipality
- Location in Salamanca
- Coordinates: 40°27′9″N 6°29′24″W
- Country: Spain
- Autonomous community: Castile and León
- Province: Salamanca
- Comarca: Comarca de Ciudad Rodrigo
- Subcomarca: Los Agadones

Government
  - Mayor: Miguel Gregorio Sánchez Castrillo (People's Party)

Area
  - Total: 47 km^{2} (18 sq mi)
- Elevation: 811 m (2,661 ft)

Population (2025-01-01)
  - Total: 252
  - Density: 5.4/km^{2} (14/sq mi)
- Time zone: UTC+1 (CET)
  - Summer (DST): UTC+2 (CEST)
- Postal code: 37510

Martiago is a municipality located in the province of Salamanca, Castile and León, Spain. As of 2016 the municipality has a population of 302 inhabitants. The municipality is known because of its flat lands favorable for wars. The origin of the name Martiago comes from "Marte" (mart) and "Terra" (Tiago) which means: "Tierra de Marte" (knowing that Marte is the God of War in the Greek mythology) or in other words, meaning that it was there where some wars happened.
