= Serradilla =

Coordinates: 39°50′N 6°08′W

Serradilla, Spain
- municipality
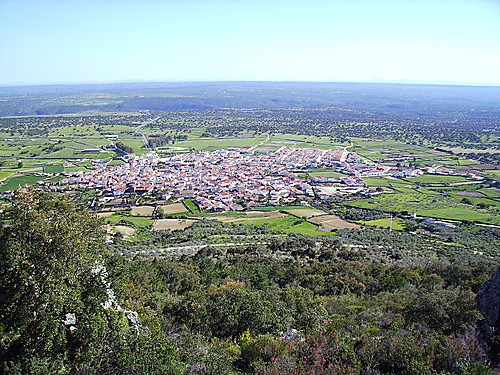
- Overlooking the town of Seradilla

- Coat of arms

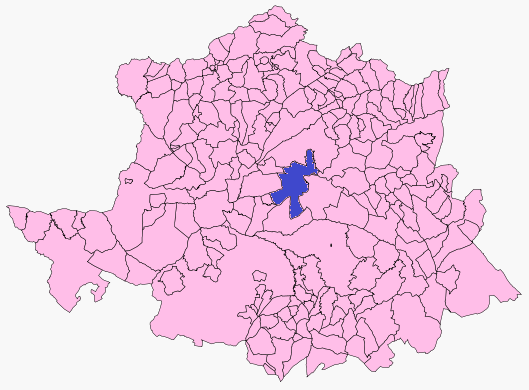
- Map of Serradilla
- Country: Spain
- Autonomous community: Extremadura
- Province: Cáceres
- Municipality: Serradilla

Area
  - Total: 259 km^{2} (100 sq mi)

Population (2025-01-01)
  - Total: 1,448
  - Density: 5.59/km^{2} (14.5/sq mi)
- Time zone: UTC+1 (CET)
  - Summer (DST): UTC+2 (CEST)

Serradilla is a municipality located in the province of Cáceres, Extremadura, Spain. The population was 1,832 at the 2004 census (INE).

In 2013, the residents of Serradilla created the first feature film in the Extremaduran language, Territoriu de bandolerus (Territory of bandits). The monthly review El Migajon is also published in Serradilla.

== See also ==
- List of municipalities in Cáceres
