= Battle of El Bodón =

1811 battle during the Peninsular War

- Part of the Peninsular War
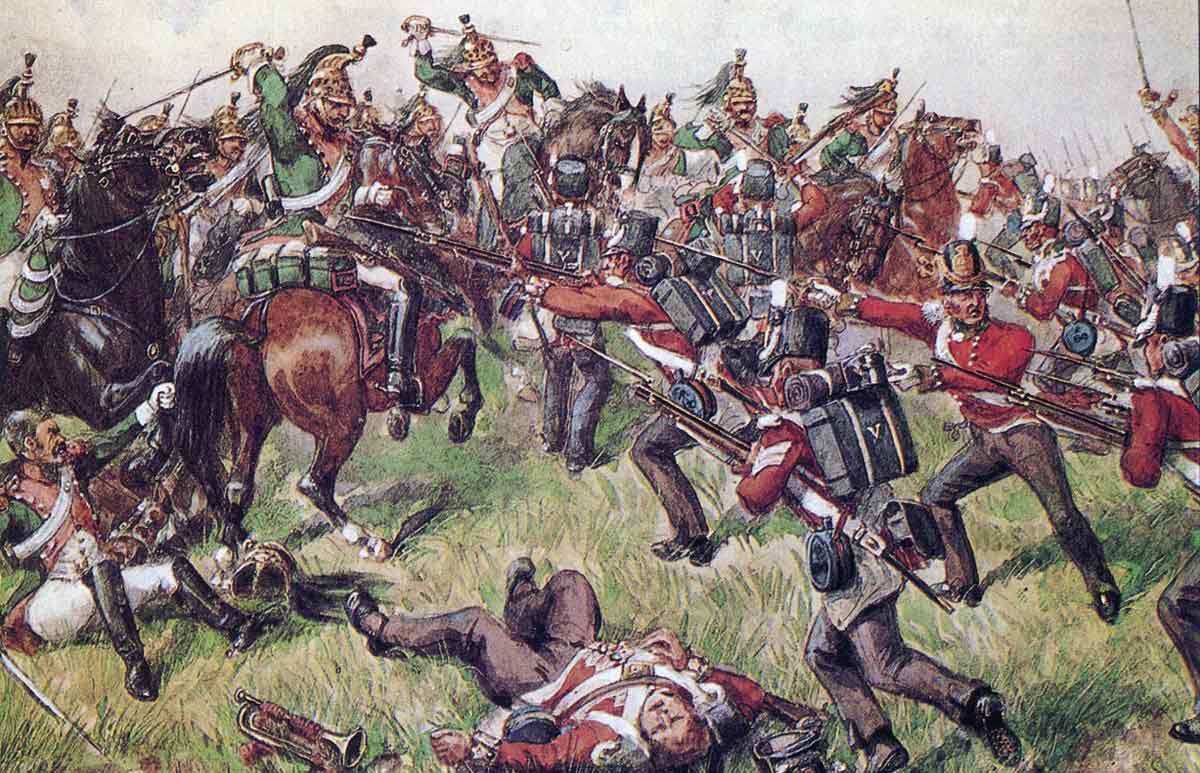
- Illustration of the battle by Richard Simkin
Date	25 September 1811
Location	Near El Bodón, Spain 40°29′N 6°34′W
Result	French victory

Belligerents
(First French Empire) French Empire	(United Kingdom of Great Britain and Ireland) United Kingdom; Portugal

Commanders and leaders
(First French Empire) Louis-Pierre Montbrun; (First French Empire) Paul Thiébault	(United Kingdom of Great Britain and Ireland) Arthur Wellesley; (United Kingdom of Great Britain and Ireland) Charles Colville; (United Kingdom of Great Britain and Ireland) Victor Alten

Strength
2,500	1,500

Casualties and losses
assumedly, up to 200	141 to 149 27 killed 92 wounded 22 missing

Peninsular War: Third French invasion

The Battle of El Bodón was a rearguard action fought on 25 September 1811 by elements of the Anglo-Portuguese army against waves of French cavalry, supported by Paul Thiébault's division of infantry of the French army during the Peninsular War. The French, under the lead of Louis-Pierre Montbrun, were able to achieve a small tactical victory, forcing the Allies under the command of A. Wellesley to retreat from a strong position, but they were unable to build on their success due to problems related to insufficient supplies.

== Background ==
Soon after the Battle of Fuentes de Oñoro, the French army withdrew from the northern frontier of Portugal, and the Duke of Wellington, with three divisions of the British Army and a corps of cavalry, blockaded Ciudad Rodrigo. In September 1811, Marshal Marmont assembled the army of the north, consisting of 60,000 infantry and 5,000 cavalry, in the neighbourhood of Salamanca, and moved on Ciudad Rodrigo, for the purpose of raising the blockade.

== Battle ==
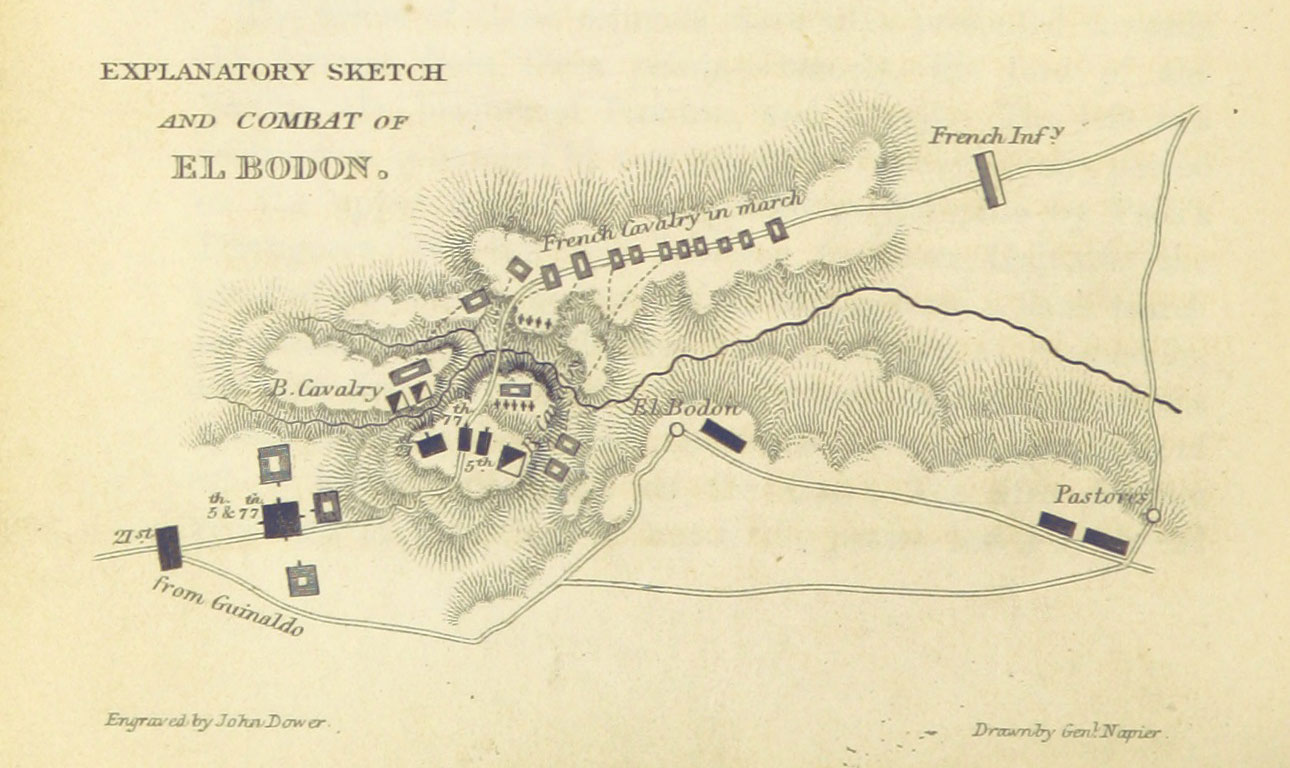
Map of the battle

On the approach of the French force, the British outposts were withdrawn, and Ciudad Rodrigo was relieved. The headquarters of the Duke of Wellington were at that time established at Fuenteguinaldo, a village about 9 miles (14 km) in the rear of Ciudad Rodrigo. The 2nd battalion of the 5th Foot, guarding Wellington's headquarters, was ordered to march to the front and reinforce two brigades of Portuguese artillery and a squadron of cavalry positioned about 3 miles (4.8 km) from Ciudad Rodrigo. About 3 miles (4.8 km) to the east of that location was the village of El Bodón, which was occupied by the Third Division, under Sir Thomas Picton. The Light Division occupied the ground between the village of El Bodón and the river Águeda, on which its right rested. The fourth and only remaining division was in rear of Fuente Guinaldo, occupying different villages, and not brought into position.

Major Henry Ridge of the 2nd/5th Foot recalled:

In consequence of guns being attached to us, I became the senior officer, and having received no orders, whether to retire if attacked (by a superior force), or to defend our post to the last extremity, I thought it prudent, in the first instance, to take the best means in my power to prevent a surprise, and planted the pickets accordingly. Feeling myself in a very responsible situation, I visited the pickets at daybreak, when I discovered large bodies of the enemy's cavalry coming out of Ciudad Rodrigo, and crossing the Agueda.

There were two roads leading from Ciudad Rodrigo; one to Fuente Guinaldo, the most practicable for guns, was to the right of the 2nd/5th foot while the other passed through the position held by the 2nd/5th. It was some time before it became clear to the allies along which of the two roads the French would advance as the undulating ground masked the French movements. Major Ridge ordered the guns to be unlimbered and the mules harnessed, ready to move at a moment's warning and deployed the 2nd/5th along an elevated ridge, with its right protected by a deep defile. As the French cavalry approached the allied position it became clear what their objective was, and the Portuguese guns opened fire against the French columns. At this moment the Duke of Wellington arrived, and after a few minutes of reconnoitring, told Major Ridge that he approved of the arrangements he had made, and would order up a brigade of cavalry in support. However, the Duke had hardly time to move to the rear before the allies were charged by a large body of cavalry, which for a moment succeeded in capturing the guns. By well-directed running fire from the 2nd/5th, followed by a charge of bayonets, the guns were retaken, and the French repulsed.

Major General Charles Colville arrived with allied reinforcements (the British 77th Foot, commanded by Lieutenant Colonel Broomhead, and 21st Portuguese regiment commanded by Colonel Bacellar), and took command for the allied force. This force, now of about 1,500 men, maintained the post for three hours, although frequently charged by French cavalry, and exposed to heavy fire from the guns of a division of infantry in reserve. Despite the failure of Montbrun's frontal assault, he saw a gap in Wellington's position and took action. The position was abandoned when the French infantry and brigade of cavalry moved forward, and the allies were forced to retire. As the ground over which the allies retreated was very favourable for cavalry, the allies were forced retired in squares of regiments, and were repeatedly charged. The French cavalry drove off the allied cavalry rearguard, but they were unable to break into the squares. Montbrun continued to put pressure on the retreating opponent, but with caution, preferring to bombard them with horse artillery. During these operations, the French pushed forward a strong body of infantry, which succeeded in cutting off the light division, but by a judicious movement of Major General Craufurd, who crossed the Agueda, that division was saved, and managed a retreat in good order.

== Aftermath ==
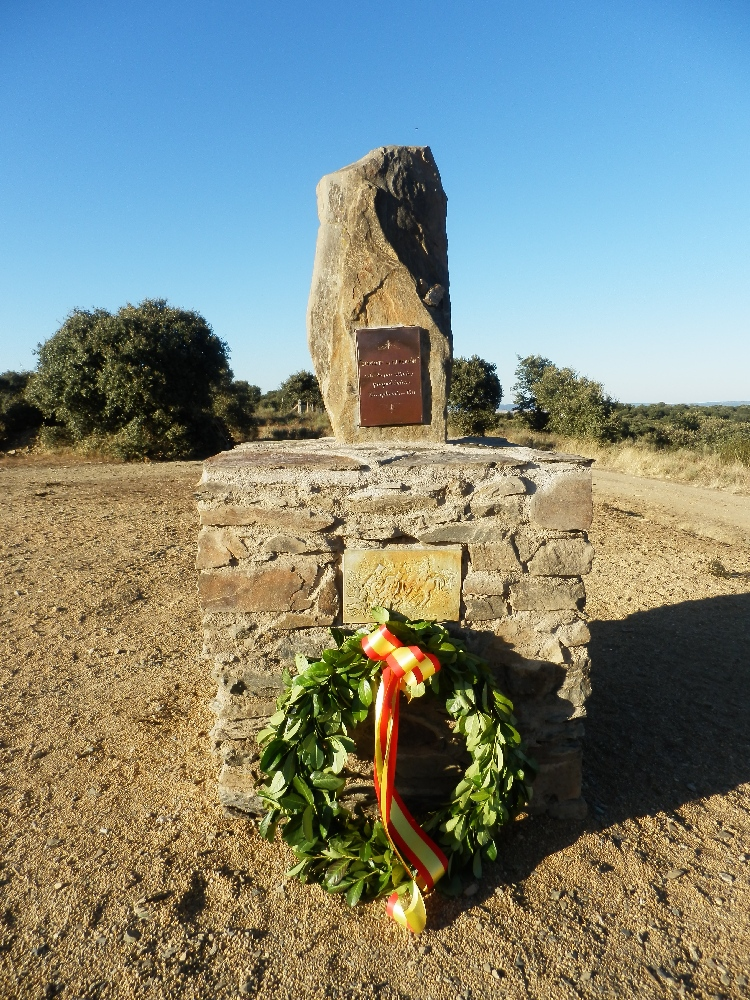
Monolith built to commemorate the 200th anniversary of the battle

The Duke of Wellington took up a position in front of Guinaldo, with the three divisions named above, from which, not being tenable, he retired on the following day and posted himself strongly behind the Cob. The French only having supplies for ten days, were obliged to fall back, and then the Anglo-Portuguese army reoccupied nearly the same ground it did before this attack. The following is a copy of the General Order issued by Wellington after the encounter:

Richosa, 2d Oct. 1811.

The Commander of the Forces is desirous of drawing the attention of the army to the conduct of the second battalion 5th, and 77th regiments, and 21st Portuguese regiment, and Major Arenschild's Portuguese artillery, under the command of the Hon. Major General Colville, and of the 11th Light Dragoons and 1st Hussars, under Major General Alten, in the affair with the enemy on the 25th ult.

These troops were attacked by between thirty and forty squadrons of cavalry, with six pieces of cannon, supported by a division consisting of fourteen battalions of infantry with cannon.

The Portuguese artillery-men were cut down at the guns before they quitted them, but the second battalion 5th regiment attacked the cavalry which had taken the guns, and retook them; at the same time the 77th regiment were attacked in front by another body of cavalry, upon which body they advanced, and repulsed them.

While these actions were performed, Major General. Alten's brigade, of which there were only three squadrons on the ground, were engaged on the left with numbers infinitely superior to themselves. These squadrons charged repeatedly, supporting each other, and took above twenty prisoners, notwithstanding the immense superiority of the enemy. The post would have been maintained, if the Commander of the Forces had not ordered the troops to withdraw from it, seeing that the action would become still more unequal, as the enemy's infantry were likely to be engaged in it, before the reinforcements ordered to the support of the post could arrive.

The troops then retired with the same determined spirit, and in the same good order, with which they had maintained their post: the second battalion 5th regiment, and 77th, in one square, and the 21st Portuguese in another, supported by Major General Alten's cavalry and the Portuguese artillery. The enemy's cavalry charged three faces of the square of the British infantry, but were beaten off, and finding from their repeated fruitless efforts, that these brave troops were not to be broken, they were contented with following them at a distance, and with firing upon them with their artillery, till the troops joined the remainder of their division, and were afterwards supported by a brigade of the fourth division.

Although the 21st Portuguese regiment were not actually charged by the cavalry, their steadiness and determination were conspicuous, and the Commander of the Forces observed with pleasure the order and regularity with which they made all their movements, and the confidence they showed in their officers.

The Commander of the Forces has been particular in stating the details of this action in General Orders, as, in his opinion, it affords a memorable example of what can be effected by steadiness, discipline, and confidence. It is impossible that any troops can at any time be exposed to the attack of numbers relatively greater than those who attacked these troops under Major General Colville and Major General Alten, on 25 September; and the Commander of the Forces recommends the conduct of these troops to the particular attention of the officers and soldiers of the army, as an example to be followed in all such circumstances.

The Commander of the Forces considers Major General Colville and Major General Alten, and the commanding officers of the regiments under their command respectively, viz. Lieutenant Colonel Cummins, 11th light dragoons, Lieutenant Colonel Arenschild, 1st Hussars, Lieutenant Colonel Broomhead, 77th regiment, Major Ridge, 5th regiment, and Colonel Bacellar, of the 21st Portuguese regiment, and the officers and soldiers under their command, to be entitled to his particular thanks, and he assures them, that he has not failed to report his sense of their conduct in the action of 25 September, to those by whom he trusts that it will be appreciated and recollected.
