= Cabrillas =

- Municipality
- Coat of arms

- Location in Salamanca

- Location in Spain
- Coordinates: 40°44′29″N 6°10′49″W
- Country: Spain
- Autonomous community: Castile and León
- Province: Salamanca
- Comarca: Comarca de Ciudad Rodrigo
- Subcomarca: Campo del Yeltes

Government
  - Mayor: Martina Carrera

Area
  - Total: 24.85 km^{2} (9.59 sq mi)
- Elevation: 797 m (2,615 ft)

Population (2025-01-01)
  - Total: 316
  - Density: 12.7/km^{2} (32.9/sq mi)
- Time zone: UTC+1 (CET)
  - Summer (DST): UTC+2 (CEST)
- Postal code: 37630

Cabrillas is a village and municipality in the province of Salamanca, western Spain, part of the autonomous community of Castile-Leon. It is located 69 kilometres (43 mi) from the city of Salamanca and as of 2016 has a population of 398 people. The municipality covers an area of 24.85 km^{2} (9.59 sq mi).

The village lies 797 metres (2,615 ft) above sea level and the postal code is 37630.

== See also ==
- List of municipalities in Salamanca
