= Agallas =

- Municipality
- Flag Coat of arms

- Location in Salamanca

- Location in Spain
- Coordinates: 40°27′N 6°26′W
- Country: Spain
- Autonomous community: Castile and León
- Province: Salamanca
- Comarca: Comarca de Ciudad Rodrigo
- Subcomarca: Los Agadones

Government
  - Mayor: Urbano Chamorro (People's Party)

Area
  - Total: 44.61 km^{2} (17.22 sq mi)
- Elevation: 817 m (2,680 ft)

Population (2025-01-01)
  - Total: 122
  - Density: 2.73/km^{2} (7.08/sq mi)
- Time zone: UTC+1 (CET)
  - Summer (DST): UTC+2 (CEST)

Agallas is a village and municipality in the province of Salamanca, western Spain, part of the autonomous community of Castile-Leon.
