= La Atalaya, Salamanca =

La Atalaya
- Municipality
- Flag Coat of arms

- Location in Salamanca
- Coordinates: 40°30′09″N 6°24′51″W
- Country: Spain
- Autonomous community: Castile and León
- Province: Salamanca
- Comarca: Comarca de Ciudad Rodrigo
- Subcomarca: Los Agadones

Government
  - Mayor: Feliciano Hernando Elvira (People's Party)

Area
  - Total: 24 km^{2} (9.3 sq mi)
- Elevation: 808 m (2,651 ft)

Population (2025-01-01)
  - Total: 102
  - Density: 4.3/km^{2} (11/sq mi)
- Time zone: UTC+1 (CET)
  - Summer (DST): UTC+2 (CEST)
- Postal code: 37591

La Atalaya is a municipality located in the province of Salamanca, Castile and León, Spain. As of 2016 the municipality has a population of 120 inhabitants.
