= Herguijuela de Ciudad Rodrigo =

- Municipality
- Location in Salamanca
- Coordinates: 40°28′50″N 6°31′05″W
- Country: Spain
- Autonomous community: Castile and León
- Province: Salamanca
- Comarca: Comarca de Ciudad Rodrigo
- Subcomarca: Los Agadones

Government
  - Mayor: Marceliano Mateos Baz (People's Party)

Area
  - Total: 23 km^{2} (8.9 sq mi)
- Elevation: 797 m (2,615 ft)

Population (2025-01-01)
  - Total: 65
  - Density: 2.8/km^{2} (7.3/sq mi)
- Time zone: UTC+1 (CET)
  - Summer (DST): UTC+2 (CEST)
- Postal code: 37516

Herguijuela de Ciudad Rodrigo (Spanish pronunciation: [eɾɣiˈxwela ðe θjuˈðað roˈðɾiɣo]) is a village and municipality in the province of Salamanca, western Spain, part of the autonomous community of Castile-León. It is located 108 kilometres (67 mi) from the provincial capital city of Salamanca and has a population of 82.

== See also ==
- List of municipalities in Salamanca
