= Zamarra =

- Municipality
- Flag Coat of arms

- Location in Salamanca
- Coordinates: 40°31′6″N 6°27′14″W
- Country: Spain
- Autonomous community: Castile and León
- Province: Salamanca
- Comarca: Comarca de Ciudad Rodrigo
- Subcomarca: Los Agadones

Government
  - Mayor: Ángel Morán Jato (People's Party)

Area
  - Total: 48 km^{2} (19 sq mi)
- Elevation: 778 m (2,552 ft)

Population (2025-01-01)
  - Total: 70
  - Density: 1.5/km^{2} (3.8/sq mi)
- Time zone: UTC+1 (CET)
  - Summer (DST): UTC+2 (CEST)
- Postal code: 37591

Zamarra is a municipality in the province of Salamanca, western Spain, part of the autonomous community of Castile-Leon. It is located 100 kilometres from the city of Salamanca and as of 2016 has a population of 105 people. The municipality covers an area of 48 km².

The village lies 778 metres above sea level and the postal code is 37591.
