= Louis-Pierre Montbrun =

French general (1770–1812)

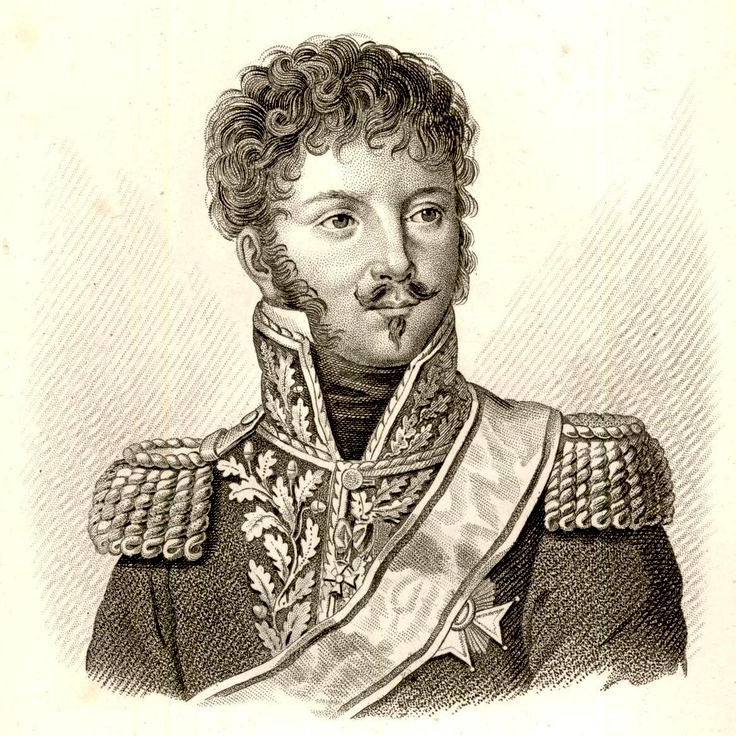
- General count Montbrun.
- Born: 1 March 1770; Florensac, France
- Died: 7 September 1812 (aged 42); Borodino, Russia
- Military career
- Allegiance: Kingdom of France; Kingdom of the French; French First Republic; First French Empire
- Branch: Cavalry
- Service years: 1789–1812
- Rank: General of Division
- Commands: II Cavalry Corps
- Conflicts: French Revolutionary Wars, Napoleonic Wars
- Awards: Légion d'honneur (Grand Officer), Name inscribed under the Arc de Triomphe, Count of the Empire

Louis Pierre, comte Montbrun (French pronunciation: [lwi pjɛʁ mɔ̃bʁœ̃]; 1770, Florensac, Hérault – 1812), French cavalry general, served with distinction in the cavalry arm throughout the wars of the Revolution and the Consulate, and in 1800 was appointed to command his regiment, having served therein from trooper upwards.

After serving at the Battle of Austerlitz on 2 December 1805, he was promoted to general of brigade. He earned further distinction in Germany and Poland, and in 1808 he was sent to Spain.

Some doubt exists as to the events of the famous cavalry charge at the Battle of Somosierra (November 1808), but Montbrun's share in it was conspicuous.

Soon afterwards he was promoted to general of division, and in 1809 his light cavalry division took no inconsiderable part in the victories of Eckmühl (April 1809) and Raab (June 1809).

Back in Spain by 1810, he fought at the battles of Bussaco (September 1810) and Fuentes de Oñoro (May 1811), where he commanded Marshal André Masséna's cavalry reserve. In September 1811 he commanded a cavalry force at the battles of El Bodón and Aldea da Ponte against Arthur Wellesley's British.

He was killed by a cannonball while commanding the II Cavalry Corps (Grande Armée) at the beginning of the Battle of Borodino (7 September 1812).
