= La Alberguería de Argañán =

- Municipality
- Coat of arms

- Location in Salamanca
- Coordinates: 40°24′43″N 6°48′51″W
- Country: Spain
- Autonomous community: Castile and León
- Province: Salamanca
- Comarca: Comarca de Ciudad Rodrigo
- Subcomarca: Campo de Argañán

Government
  - Mayor: José María Narciso Alfonso González (PSOE)

Area
  - Total: 30 km^{2} (12 sq mi)
- Elevation: 739 m (2,425 ft)

Population (2025-01-01)
  - Total: 94
  - Density: 3.1/km^{2} (8.1/sq mi)
- Time zone: UTC+1 (CET)
  - Summer (DST): UTC+2 (CEST)
- Postal code: 37555

La Alberguería de Argañán is a village and municipality in the province of Salamanca, western Spain, part of the autonomous community of Castile-Leon. It is located 122 kilometres (76 mi) from the provincial capital city of Salamanca. The city had a population of 134 as of 2016, and 98 as of 2024.

== Geography ==
The municipality covers an area of 30 km^{2} (12 sq mi). It lies 739 metres (2,425 ft) above sea level.

== See also ==
- List of municipalities in Salamanca
