= Los Agadones =

- Comarca
- Nicknames: Campo del Agadón, Campo de Agadones, Los Agadones
- Interactive map of Los Agadones
- Country: Spain
- Autonomous community: Castile and León
- Province: Salamanca
- Comarca: Comarca de Ciudad Rodrigo

Area
  - Total: 442.53 km^{2} (170.86 sq mi)

Population (2010)
  - Total: 1,776
  - Density: 4.013/km^{2} (10.39/sq mi)
- Time zone: UTC+1 (CET)
  - Summer (DST): CEST

Los Agadones is a subcomarca in the comarca of Comarca de Ciudad Rodrigo in the province of Salamanca, Castile and León. It contains nine municipalities: Agallas, La Atalaya, Herguijuela, Martiago, Monsagro, El Sahugo, Serradilla del Arroyo, Serradilla del Llano and Zamarra.
