= La Alameda de Gardón =

- Municipality
- Coat of arms

- Location in Salamanca

- Location in Spain
- Coordinates: 40°39′3″N 6°45′31″W
- Country: Spain
- Autonomous community: Castile and León
- Province: Salamanca
- Comarca: Comarca de Ciudad Rodrigo
- Subcomarca: Campo de Argañán

Government
  - Mayor: Lorenzo Patino Galán (People's Party)

Area
  - Total: 32 km^{2} (12 sq mi)
- Elevation: 714 m (2,343 ft)

Population (2025-01-01)
  - Total: 67
  - Density: 2.1/km^{2} (5.4/sq mi)
- Time zone: UTC+1 (CET)
  - Summer (DST): UTC+2 (CEST)
- Postal code: 37497

La Alameda de Gardón is a village and municipality in the province of Salamanca, western Spain, part of the autonomous community of Castile-Leon. It has a population of 83 people.

== Geography ==
The municipality covers an area of 32 km^{2} (12 sq mi). It lies 714 metres (2,343 ft) above sea level.
