= Carpio de Azaba =

- Municipality
- Flag Coat of arms

- Location in Salamanca

- Location in Spain
- Coordinates: 40°36′N 6°38′W
- Country: Spain
- Autonomous community: Castile and León
- Province: Salamanca
- Comarca: Comarca de Ciudad Rodrigo
- Subcomarca: Campo de Argañán

Government
  - Mayor: Vidal Arturo Gómez Tabernero (People's Party)

Area
  - Total: 70 km^{2} (27 sq mi)
- Elevation: 681 m (2,234 ft)

Population (2025-01-01)
  - Total: 110
  - Density: 1.6/km^{2} (4.1/sq mi)
- Time zone: UTC+1 (CET)
  - Summer (DST): UTC+2 (CEST)
- Postal code: 37496

Carpio de Azaba is a village and municipality in the province of Salamanca, western Spain, part of the autonomous community of Castile-Leon. It is located 100 kilometres (62 mi) west of the city of Salamanca and as of 2016 has a population of 101 people. The municipality covers an area of 70 km^{2} (27 sq mi).

The village lies 681 metres (2,234 ft) above sea level and the postal code is 37496.
