= Retortillo =

- Municipality
- Coat of arms

- Location in Salamanca
- Coordinates: 40°48′06″N 6°21′35″W
- Country: Spain
- Autonomous community: Castile and León
- Province: Salamanca
- Comarca: Comarca de Ciudad Rodrigo
- Subcomarca: Campo del Yeltes

Government
  - Mayor: Manuel Francisco Hernández Prieto (PSOE)

Area
  - Total: 65 km^{2} (25 sq mi)
- Elevation: 768 m (2,520 ft)

Population (2025-01-01)
  - Total: 172
  - Density: 2.6/km^{2} (6.9/sq mi)
- Time zone: UTC+1 (CET)
  - Summer (DST): UTC+2 (CEST)
- Postal code: 37495

Retortillo is a municipality located in the province of Salamanca, Castile and León, Spain.

== Mine ==
A Uranium mine in Retortillo is proposed by Berkeley Minera, an Australian mining company. Being only 50 km to the Portugal–Spain border, a protest was held in Portugal by several Iberian protest groups, they oppose the mine and also marked twentieth anniversary of the mining disaster in Spain known as the Doñana disaster. The Portuguese government has asked the Spanish government for a meeting regarding the mine.
