= Ituero de Azaba =

- Municipality
- Coat of arms

- Location in Salamanca
- Coordinates: 40°29′4″N 6°41′30″W
- Country: Spain
- Autonomous community: Castile and León
- Province: Salamanca
- Comarca: Comarca de Ciudad Rodrigo
- Subcomarca: Campo de Argañán

Government
  - Mayor: Francisco Javier Carballo Sánchez (People's Party)

Area
  - Total: 27 km^{2} (10 sq mi)
- Elevation: 661 m (2,169 ft)

Population (2025-01-01)
  - Total: 189
  - Density: 7.0/km^{2} (18/sq mi)
- Time zone: UTC+1 (CET)
  - Summer (DST): UTC+2 (CEST)
- Postal code: 37551

Ituero de Azaba is a village and municipality in the province of Salamanca, western Spain, part of the autonomous community of Castile-Leon. It is located 108 kilometres (67 mi) from the provincial capital city of Salamanca and has a population of 235 people.

== Geography ==
The municipality covers an area of 27 km^{2} (10 sq mi). It lies 661 metres (2,169 ft) above sea level and the postal code is 37551.

== See also ==
- List of municipalities in Salamanca
