= Abusejo =

- municipality
- Coat of arms

- Location in Salamanca

- Location in Spain
- Coordinates: 40°42′35″N 6°08′24″W
- Country: Spain
- Autonomous community: Castile and León
- Province: Salamanca
- Comarca: Comarca de Ciudad Rodrigo
- Subcomarca: Campo del Yeltes

Government
  - Mayor: Jesus Angel Garcia Herrero (People's Party)

Area
  - Total: 23.10 km^{2} (8.92 sq mi)
- Elevation: 841 m (2,759 ft)

Population (2025-01-01)
  - Total: 148
  - Density: 6.41/km^{2} (16.6/sq mi)
- Time zone: UTC+1 (CET)
  - Summer (DST): UTC+2 (CEST)

Abusejo is a village and municipality in the province of Salamanca, western Spain, part of the autonomous community of Castile and León. As of 2016 it had a population of 202 people. Covering an area of 23 km^{2} (8.9 sq mi), the village lies at an elevation of 845 metres (2,772 ft) above sea level.
