= Campo de Robledo =

- Comarca
- Location in Salamanca
- Coordinates: 40°28′0″N 6°35′59″W
- Country: Spain
- Autonomous community: Castile and León
- Province: Salamanca
- Comarca: Comarca de Ciudad Rodrigo

Area
  - Total: 550.84 km^{2} (212.68 sq mi)

Population (2010)
  - Total: 3,597
  - Density: 6.530/km^{2} (16.91/sq mi)
- Time zone: UTC+1 (CET)
  - Summer (DST): CEST

Campo de Robledo is a subcomarca in the comarca of Comarca de Ciudad Rodrigo in the province of Salamanca, Castile and León. It contains five municipalities: El Bodón, Casillas de Flores, La Encina, Fuenteguinaldo and Pastores.
