= Sepulcro-Hilario =

- Municipality
- Flag Coat of arms

- Location in Salamanca
- Coordinates: 40°41′53″N 6°11′17″W
- Country: Spain
- Autonomous community: Castile and León
- Province: Salamanca
- Comarca: Comarca de Ciudad Rodrigo
- Subcomarca: Campo del Yeltes

Government
  - Mayor: José Agustín García Guillen (People's Party)

Area
  - Total: 40 km^{2} (15 sq mi)
- Elevation: 832 m (2,730 ft)

Population (2025-01-01)
  - Total: 153
  - Density: 3.8/km^{2} (9.9/sq mi)
- Time zone: UTC+1 (CET)
  - Summer (DST): UTC+2 (CEST)
- Postal code: 37638

Sepulcro-Hilario is a municipality located in the province of Salamanca, Castile and León, Spain. As of 2016 the municipality has a population of 181 inhabitants.
