= La Bouza =

- Municipality
- Location in Salamanca
- Coordinates: 40°50′7″N 6°47′43″W
- Country: Spain
- Autonomous community: Castile and León
- Province: Salamanca
- Comarca: Comarca de Ciudad Rodrigo
- Subcomarca: Campo de Argañán

Government
  - Mayor: Narciso Reyes Simón (People's Party)

Area
  - Total: 15 km^{2} (5.8 sq mi)
- Elevation: 608 m (1,995 ft)

Population (2025-01-01)
  - Total: 48
  - Density: 3.2/km^{2} (8.3/sq mi)
- Time zone: UTC+1 (CET)
  - Summer (DST): UTC+2 (CEST)
- Postal code: 37488

La Bouza (A Bouça, in Portuguese) is a municipality located in the province of Salamanca, Castile and León, Spain.

== See also ==
- List of municipalities in Salamanca
