= Martín de Yeltes =

- Municipality
- Coat of arms

- Location in Salamanca
- Coordinates: 40°46′28″N 6°17′28″W
- Country: Spain
- Autonomous community: Castile and León
- Province: Salamanca
- Comarca: Comarca de Ciudad Rodrigo
- Subcomarca: Campo del Yeltes

Government
  - Mayor: José Luis Martín García (PSOE)

Area
  - Total: 63 km^{2} (24 sq mi)
- Elevation: 760 m (2,490 ft)

Population (2025-01-01)
  - Total: 383
  - Density: 6.1/km^{2} (16/sq mi)
- Time zone: UTC+1 (CET)
  - Summer (DST): UTC+2 (CEST)
- Postal code: 37494

Martín de Yeltes is a municipality located in the province of Salamanca, Castile and León, Spain. As of 2016 the municipality has a population of 436 inhabitants.
