= Serradilla del Llano =

- Municipality
- Location in Salamanca
- Coordinates: 40°30′2″N 6°21′21″W
- Country: Spain
- Autonomous community: Castile and León
- Province: Salamanca
- Comarca: Comarca de Ciudad Rodrigo
- Subcomarca: Los Agadones

Government
  - Mayor: Fermín Mangas Rodríguez (People's Party)

Area
  - Total: 67.52 km^{2} (26.07 sq mi)
- Elevation: 879 m (2,884 ft)

Population (2025-01-01)
  - Total: 136
  - Density: 2.01/km^{2} (5.22/sq mi)
- Time zone: UTC+1 (CET)
  - Summer (DST): UTC+2 (CEST)
- Postal code: 37530

Serradilla del Llano is a municipality located in the province of Salamanca, Castile and León, Spain. As of 2016 the municipality has a population of 172 inhabitants.
