= La Alamedilla =

- Municipality
- Coat of arms

- Location in Salamanca
- Coordinates: 40°28′19″N 6°49′37″W
- Country: Spain
- Autonomous community: Castile and León
- Province: Salamanca
- Comarca: Comarca de Ciudad Rodrigo
- Subcomarca: Campo de Argañán

Government
  - Mayor: Juan Manuel Sánchez Sánchez (People's Party)

Area
  - Total: 19 km^{2} (7.3 sq mi)
- Elevation: 756 m (2,480 ft)

Population (2025-01-01)
  - Total: 94
  - Density: 4.9/km^{2} (13/sq mi)
- Time zone: UTC+1 (CET)
  - Summer (DST): UTC+2 (CEST)
- Postal code: 37469

La Alamedilla is a town and municipality in Spain, in the province of Salamanca, part of the autonomous community of Castile-Leon. It has a population of 209 inhabitants.

The town is close to the border with Portugal, and the traditional local dialect can be considered a variety of Portuguese language. It also bears striking resemblance to the dialect called Fala, spoken in another Spanish area bordering Portugal, the Xalima Valley. The dialect spoken in La Alamedilla has been classified as a Portuguese, Galician or Extremaduran dialect.

== Geography ==
The municipality covers an area of 19 km^{2} (7.3 sq mi). It lies 756 metres (2,480 ft) above sea level and the postal code is 37469.

== See also ==
- List of municipalities in Salamanca
