= La Encina =

- Municipality
- Coat of arms

- Location in Salamanca

- Location in Spain
- Coordinates: 40°29′56″N 6°31′54″W
- Country: Spain
- Community: Castile and León
- Province: Salamanca
- Comarca: Comarca de Ciudad Rodrigo
- Subcomarca: Campo de Robledo

Government
  - Mayor: María Josefa Gómez Corvo (PSOE)

Area
  - Total: 31 km^{2} (12 sq mi)
- Elevation: 802 m (2,631 ft)

Population (2025-01-01)
  - Total: 95
  - Density: 3.1/km^{2} (7.9/sq mi)
- Time zone: UTC+1 (CET)
  - Summer (DST): UTC+2 (CEST)
- Postal code: 37515

La Encina is a municipality located in the province of Salamanca, Castile and León, Spain.
