= Campo de Argañán =

- Comarca
- Location in Salamanca
- Coordinates: 40.622392°N 6.729136°W
- Country: Spain
- Autonomous community: Castile and León
- Province: Salamanca
- Comarca: Comarca de Ciudad Rodrigo

Area
  - Total: 864.09 km^{2} (333.63 sq mi)

Population (2010)
  - Total: 4,734
  - Density: 5.479/km^{2} (14.19/sq mi)
- Time zone: UTC+1 (CET)
  - Summer (DST): CEST

Campo de Argañán is a subcomarca in the comarca of Comarca de Ciudad Rodrigo in the province of Salamanca, Castile and León. It contains 18 municipalities:

- Aldea del Obispo
- Campillo de Azaba
- Carpio de Azaba
- Castillejo de Martín Viejo
- Espeja
- Fuentes de Oñoro
- Gallegos de Argañán
- Ituero de Azaba
- La Alameda de Gardón
- La Alamedilla
- La Alberguería de Argañán
- La Bouza
- Puebla de Azaba
- Puerto Seguro
- Saelices el Chico
- Villar de Argañán
- Villar de Ciervo
- Villar de la Yegua.
