= Saelices el Chico =

- Municipality
- Flag Coat of arms

- Location in Salamanca
- Coordinates: 40°40′6″N 6°38′3″W
- Country: Spain
- Autonomous community: Castile and León
- Province: Salamanca
- Comarca: Comarca de Ciudad Rodrigo
- Subcomarca: Campo de Argañán

Government
  - Mayor: Juan Antonio Moro Martín (People's Party)

Area
  - Total: 26 km^{2} (10 sq mi)
- Elevation: 651 m (2,136 ft)

Population (2025-01-01)
  - Total: 175
  - Density: 6.7/km^{2} (17/sq mi)
- Time zone: UTC+1 (CET)
  - Summer (DST): UTC+2 (CEST)
- Postal code: 37592

Saelices el Chico is a municipality located in the province of Salamanca, Castile and León, Spain. As of 2016 the municipality has a population of 152 inhabitants.

== See also ==
List of municipalities in Salamanca
