= Navasfrías =

- Municipality
- Flag Coat of arms

- Location in Salamanca
- Coordinates: 40°17′47″N 6°49′12″W
- Country: Spain
- Autonomous community: Castile and León
- Province: Salamanca
- Comarca: Comarca de Ciudad Rodrigo
- Subcomarca: El Rebollar

Government
  - Mayor: Esteban Alfoso González (People's Party)

Area
  - Total: 60 km^{2} (23 sq mi)
- Elevation: 902 m (2,959 ft)

Population (2025-01-01)
  - Total: 365
  - Density: 6.1/km^{2} (16/sq mi)
- Time zone: UTC+1 (CET)
  - Summer (DST): UTC+2 (CEST)
- Postal code: 37542

Navasfrías is a municipality located in the province of Salamanca, Castile and León, Spain. As of 2016 the municipality has a population of 470 inhabitants.
