= Casillas de Flores =

- Municipality
- Coat of arms

- Location in Salamanca

- Location in Spain
- Coordinates: 40°23′N 6°45′W
- Country: Spain
- Autonomous community: Castile and León
- Province: Salamanca
- Comarca: Comarca de Ciudad Rodrigo
- Subcomarca: Campo de Robledo

Government
  - Mayor: José Eloy Alfonso Baile (People's Party)

Area
  - Total: 43 km^{2} (17 sq mi)
- Elevation: 853 m (2,799 ft)

Population (2025-01-01)
  - Total: 171
  - Density: 4.0/km^{2} (10/sq mi)
- Time zone: UTC+1 (CET)
  - Summer (DST): UTC+2 (CEST)
- Postal code: 37541

Casillas de Flores is a village and municipality in the province of Salamanca, western Spain, part of the autonomous community of Castile-Leon. It is located 123 kilometres (76 mi) from the city of Salamanca and as of 2016 has a population of 183 people. The municipality covers an area of 42.6 km^{2} (16.4 sq mi).

The village lies 853 metres (2,799 ft) above sea level and the post code is 37541.

== History ==
The village was founded by Alfonso VI in about 1650. It is known for its position on a smuggling route connecting Spain to Portugal. During the 1960s many of the residents emigrated to (then) more economically dynamic places such as France, Switzerland and the Basque country.
