= Villar de Argañán =

- Municipality
- Location in Salamanca
- Coordinates: 40°40′40″N 6°42′27″W
- Country: Spain
- Autonomous community: Castile and León
- Province: Salamanca
- Comarca: Comarca de Ciudad Rodrigo
- Subcomarca: Campo de Argañán

Government
  - Mayor: Luis Ángel Moro Benito (People's Party)

Area
  - Total: 30 km^{2} (12 sq mi)
- Elevation: 718 m (2,356 ft)

Population (2025-01-01)
  - Total: 95
  - Density: 3.2/km^{2} (8.2/sq mi)
- Time zone: UTC+1 (CET)
  - Summer (DST): UTC+2 (CEST)
- Postal code: 37497

Villar de Argañán is a municipality located in the province of Salamanca, Castile and León, Spain. In 2016 the municipality had a population of 89 inhabitants. Located 105 km from Salamanca, it was known as Villar del Puerco until the 1950s.
