= Villar de Olalla =

- municipality
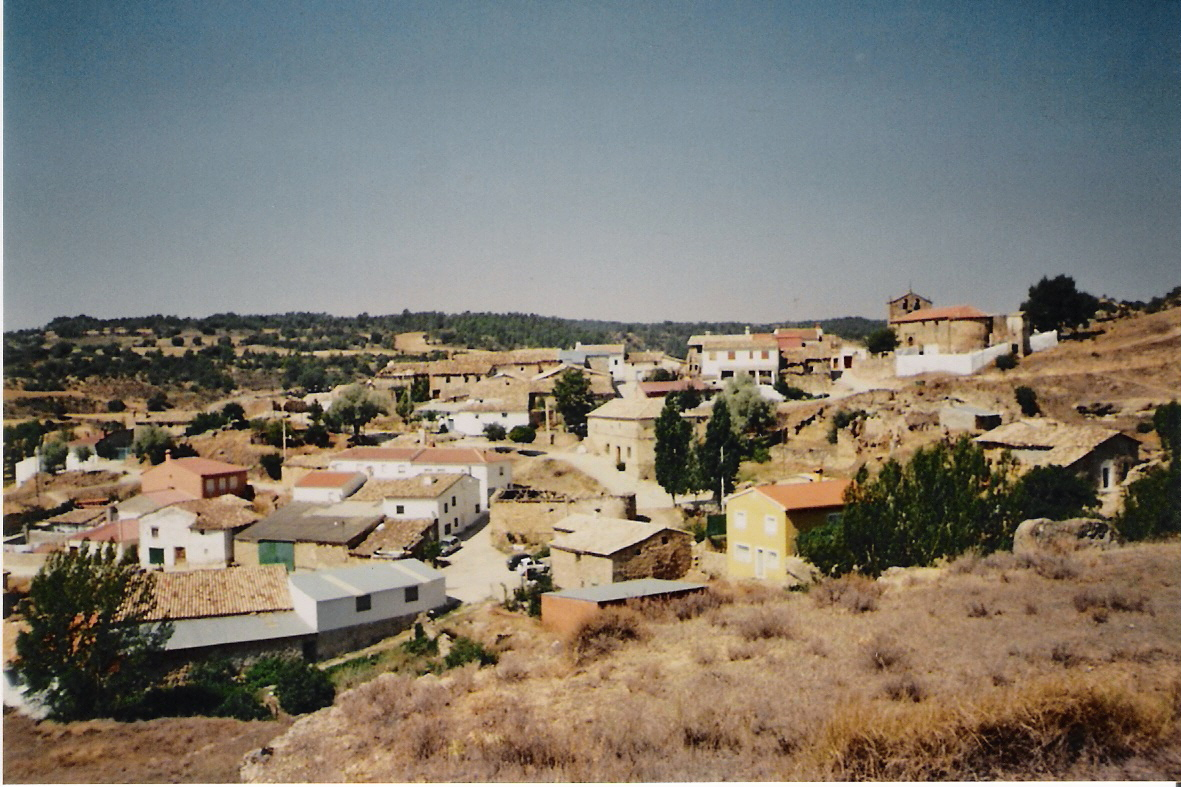

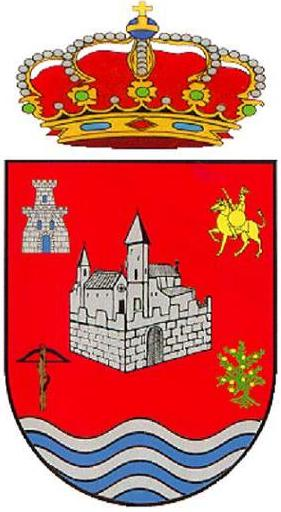
- Flag Coat of arms

- Location within Spain Location within Castilla-La Mancha
- Coordinates: 40°01′N 2°12′W
- Country: Spain
- Autonomous community: Castile-La Mancha
- Province: Cuenca

Area
  - Total: 158 km^{2} (61 sq mi)

Population (2025-01-01)
  - Total: 1,575
  - Density: 9.97/km^{2} (25.8/sq mi)
- Time zone: UTC+1 (CET)
  - Summer (DST): UTC+2 (CEST)

Villar de Olalla is a municipality located in the province of Cuenca, Castile-La Mancha, Spain. According to the 2006 census (INE), the municipality has a population of 1,061 inhabitants.
