= Castillejo de Martín Viejo =

- Municipality
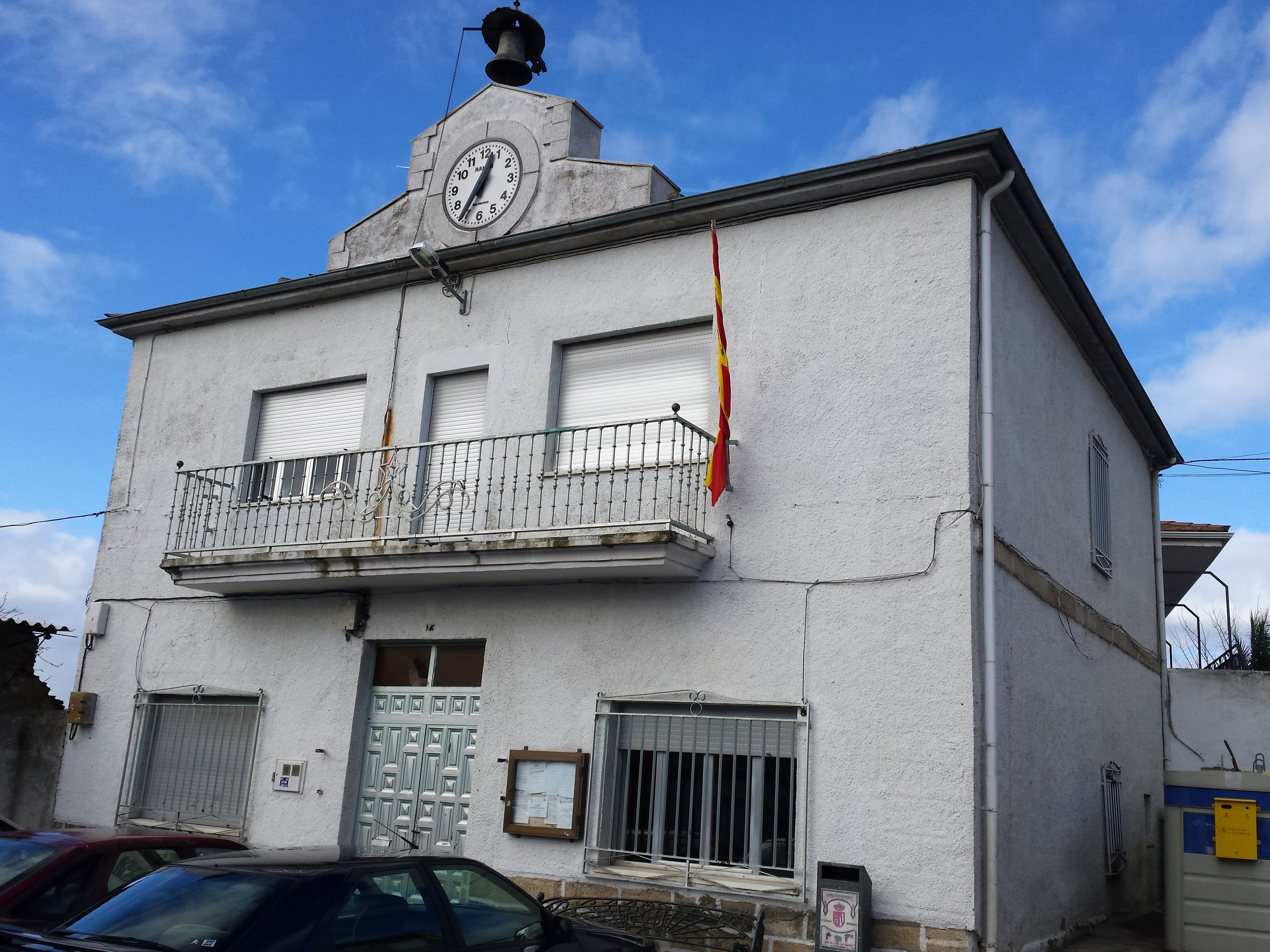

- Coat of arms

- Location in Salamanca

- Location in Spain
- Coordinates: 40°42′02″N 6°38′44″W
- Country: Spain
- Community: Castile and León
- Province: Salamanca
- Comarca: Comarca de Ciudad Rodrigo
- Subcomarca: Campo de Argañán

Government
  - Mayor: Cándido Palacios Palacios (People's Party)

Area
  - Total: 156 km^{2} (60 sq mi)
- Elevation: 672 m (2,205 ft)

Population (2025-01-01)
  - Total: 193
  - Density: 1.24/km^{2} (3.20/sq mi)
- Demonym: Castillejenses
- Time zone: UTC+1 (CET)
  - Summer (DST): UTC+2 (CEST)
- Postal code: 37592

Castillejo de Martín Viejo is a municipality in the province of Salamanca, western Spain, part of the autonomous community of Castile and León. It is located 102 kilometres (63 mi) from the city of Salamanca. As of 2016 it has a population of 227.
