= Robleda =

- Municipality
- Coat of arms

- Location in Salamanca
- Coordinates: 40°23′06″N 6°36′30″W
- Country: Spain
- Autonomous community: Castile and León
- Province: Salamanca
- Comarca: Comarca de Ciudad Rodrigo
- Subcomarca: El Rebollar

Government
  - Mayor: José Luis Varas Carballo (PSOE)

Area
  - Total: 79 km^{2} (31 sq mi)
- Elevation: 829 m (2,720 ft)

Population (2025-01-01)
  - Total: 453
  - Density: 5.7/km^{2} (15/sq mi)
- Time zone: UTC+1 (CET)
  - Summer (DST): UTC+2 (CEST)
- Postal code: 37521

Robleda is a municipality located in the province of Salamanca, Castile and León, Spain. As of 2016 the municipality has a population of 513 inhabitants.
