= Boada de Campos =

Coordinates: 41°59′N 4°52′W

- municipality
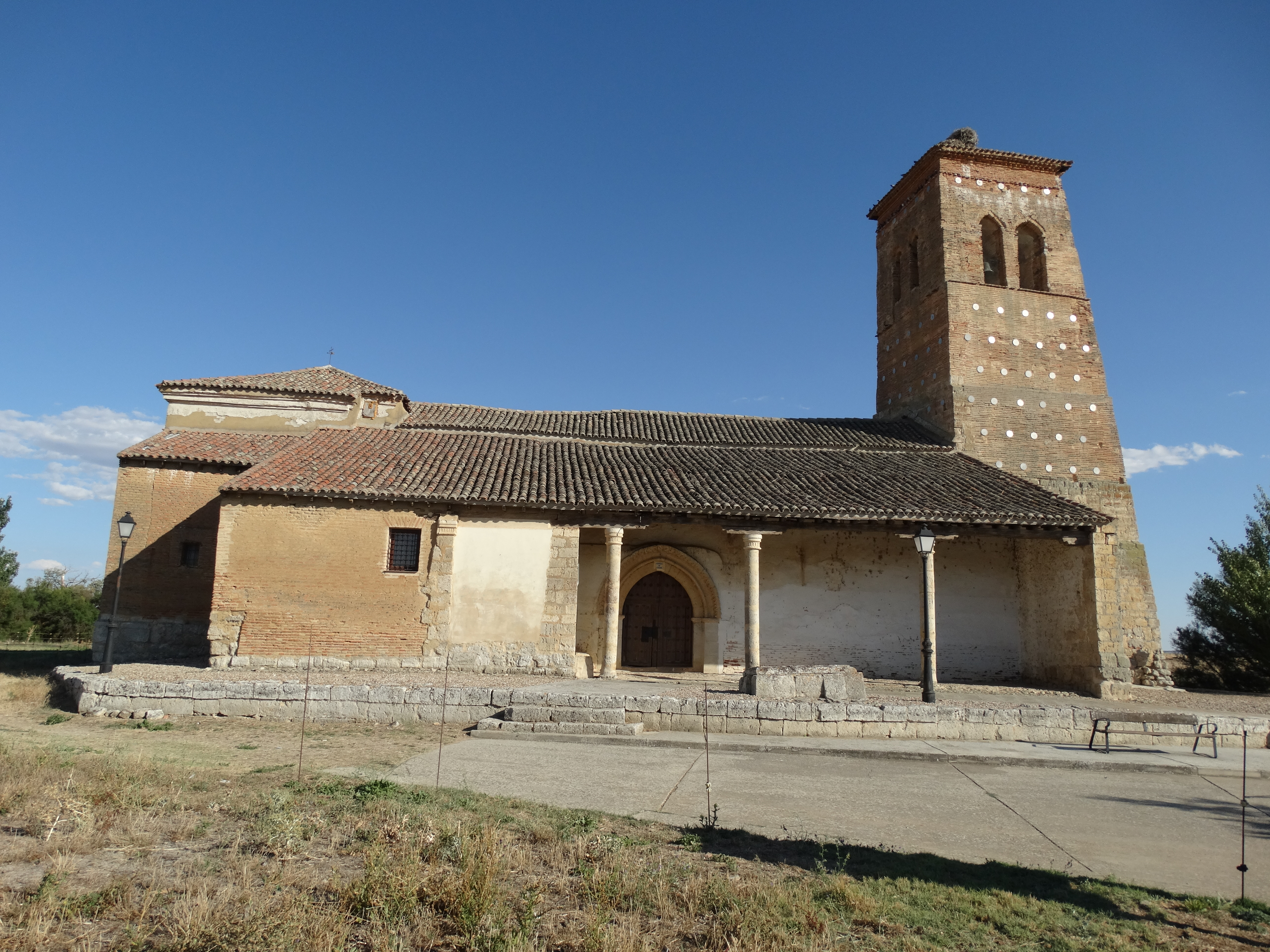
- Interactive map of Boada de Campos
- Country: Spain
- Autonomous community: Castile and León
- Province: Palencia
- Municipality: Boada de Campos

Area
  - Total: 14 km^{2} (5.4 sq mi)
- Elevation: 741 m (2,431 ft)

Population (2025-01-01)
  - Total: 17
  - Density: 1.2/km^{2} (3.1/sq mi)
- Time zone: UTC+1 (CET)
  - Summer (DST): UTC+2 (CEST)
- Website: Official website

Boada de Campos is a municipality located in the province of Palencia, Castile and León, Spain. It is in the Tierra de Campos.

According to the 2004 census (INE), the municipality had a population of 22 inhabitants.

== Ecology ==
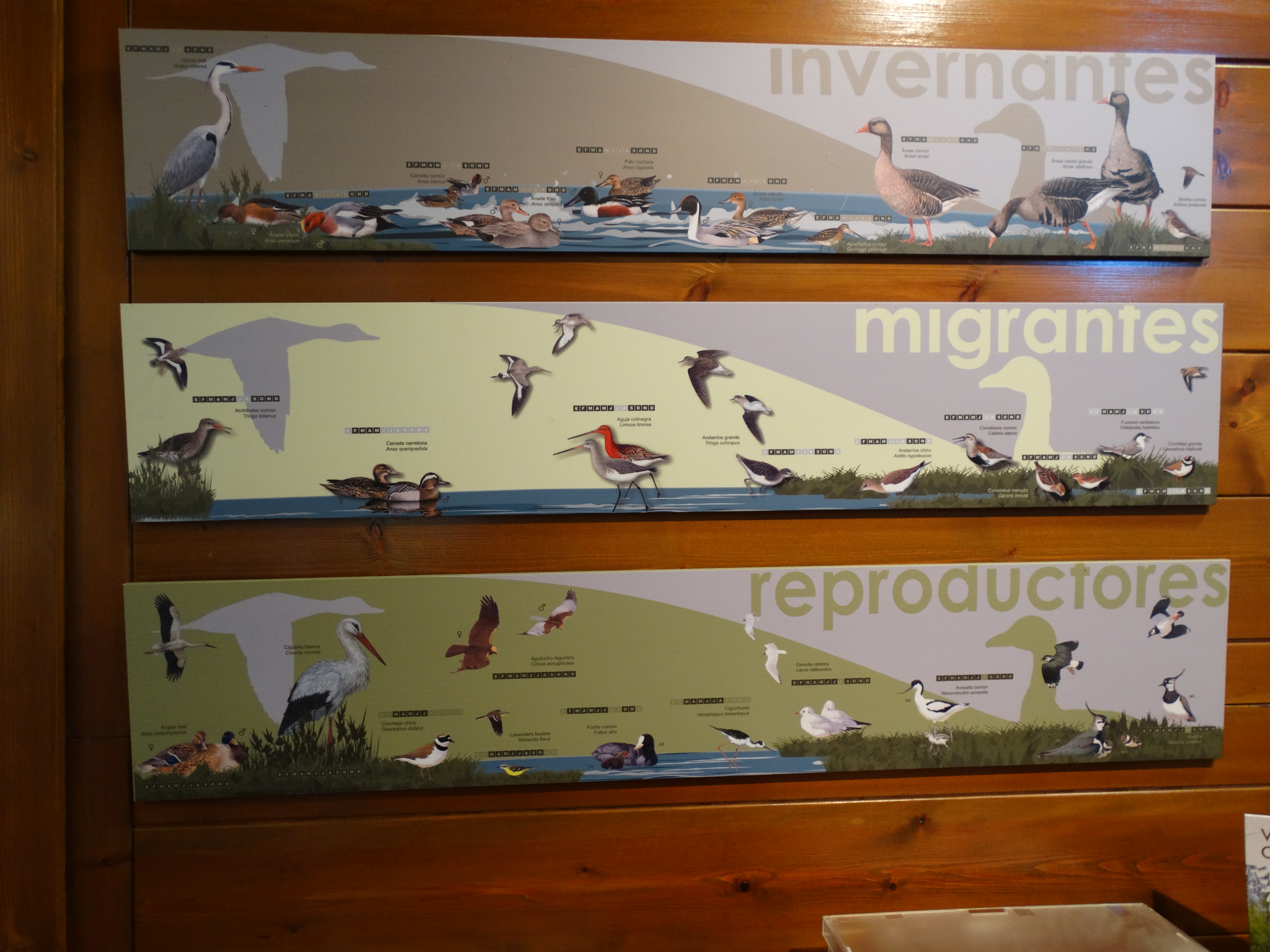
A display about the birds

The municipality is included in a Special Protection Area. A site of particular interest to bird-watchers is the Laguna de Boada, a restored wetland. It is noted for its wintering waterfowl.
