= Castraz =

- Municipality
- Location in Salamanca
- Coordinates: 40°42′N 6°20′W
- Country: Spain
- Autonomous community: Castile and León
- Province: Salamanca
- Comarca: Comarca de Ciudad Rodrigo
- Subcomarca: Campo del Yeltes

Government
  - Mayor: Roberto de Arriba Bernal (People's Party)

Area
  - Total: 30 km^{2} (12 sq mi)
- Elevation: 760 m (2,490 ft)

Population (2025-01-01)
  - Total: 33
  - Density: 1.1/km^{2} (2.8/sq mi)
- Time zone: UTC+1 (CET)
  - Summer (DST): UTC+2 (CEST)
- Postal code: 37496

Castraz is a municipality in the province of Salamanca, western Spain, part of the autonomous community of Castile-Leon. It is located 67 kilometres (42 mi) from the city of Salamanca and as of 2018 has a population of only 42 people. The municipality covers an area of 30 km^{2} (12 sq mi) and lies 760 metres (2,490 ft) above sea level.
