= Villar del Ala =

- Municipality
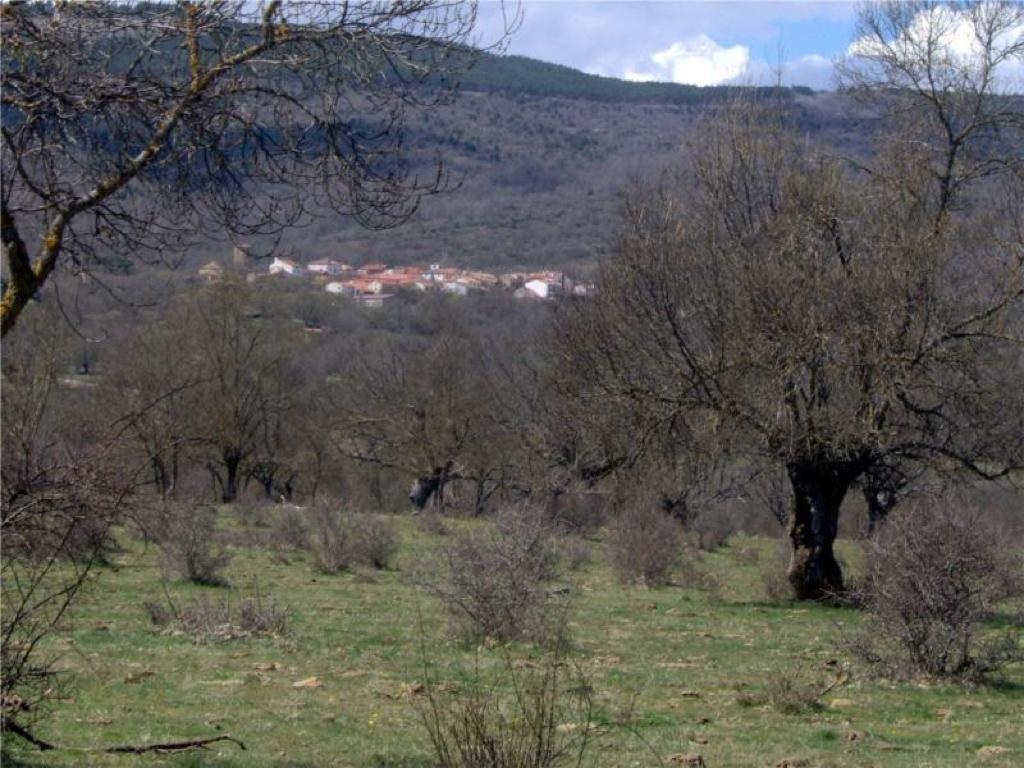

- Location within Castile and León Location within Spain
- Coordinates: 41°54′58″N 2°33′59″W
- Country: Spain
- Autonomous community: Castile and León
- Province: Soria
- Municipality: Villar del Ala

Area
  - Total: 11.70 km^{2} (4.52 sq mi)
- Elevation: 1,123 m (3,684 ft)

Population (2025-01-01)
  - Total: 50
  - Density: 4.3/km^{2} (11/sq mi)
- Time zone: UTC+1 (CET)
  - Summer (DST): UTC+2 (CEST)
- Website: Official website

Villar del Ala is a municipality located in the province of Soria, Castile and León, Spain. According to the 2004 census (INE), the municipality had a population of 57 inhabitants.
