= Puebla de Beleña =

Puebla de Beleña, Spain
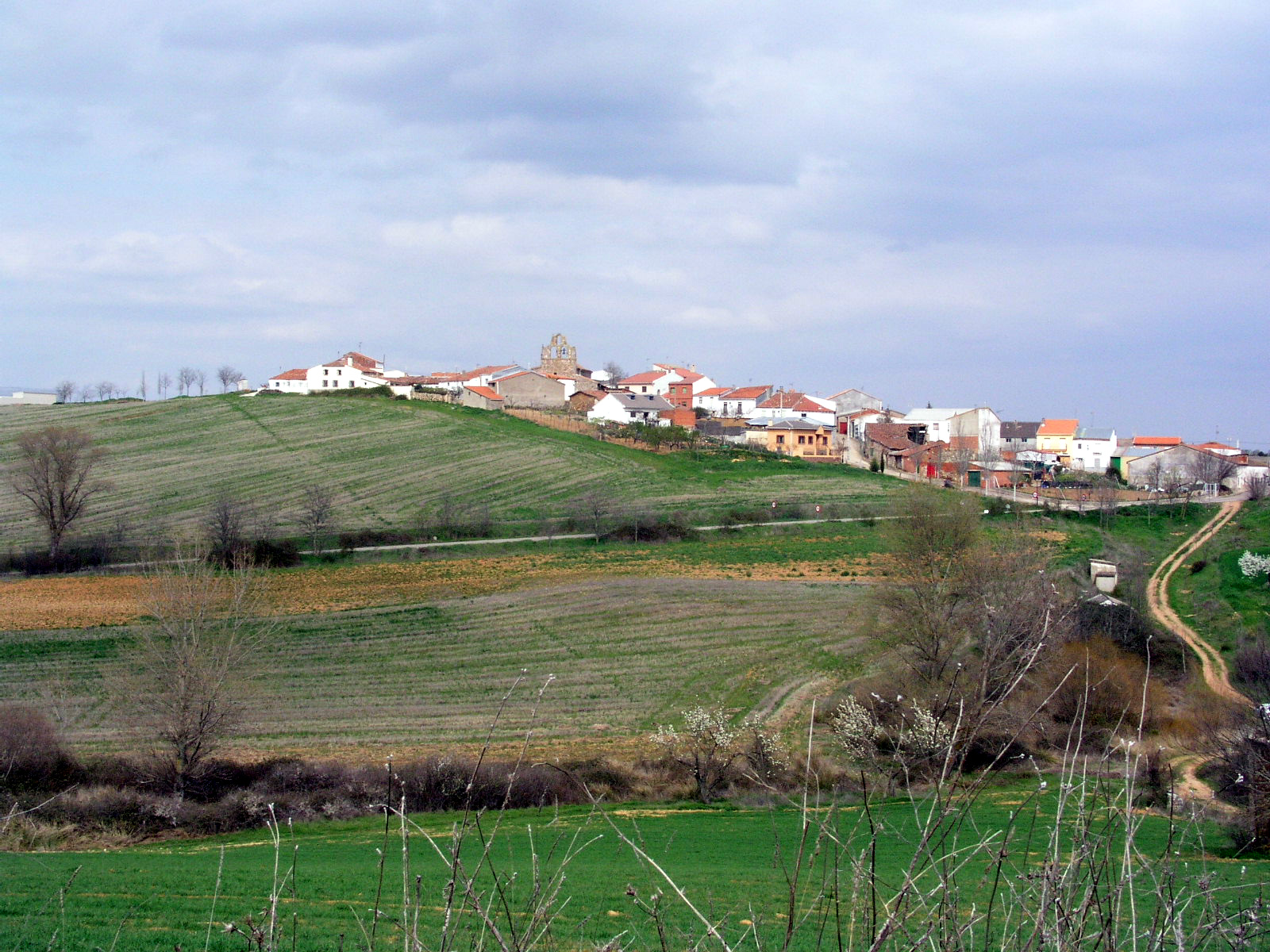

- Coat of arms

- Location within Province of Guadalajara Location within Castilla-La Mancha Location within Spain
- Country: Spain
- Autonomous community: Castile-La Mancha
- Province: Guadalajara
- Municipality: Puebla de Beleña

Area
  - Total: 29.15 km^{2} (11.25 sq mi)
- Elevation: 935 m (3,068 ft)

Population (2025-01-01)
  - Total: 57
  - Density: 2.0/km^{2} (5.1/sq mi)
- Time zone: UTC+1 (CET)
  - Summer (DST): UTC+2 (CEST)

Puebla de Beleña is a municipality located in the province of Guadalajara, Castile-La Mancha, Spain. According to the 2004 census (INE), the municipality had a population of 52 inhabitants.
