= Lucas Boada =

Cuban baseball player (born 1893)

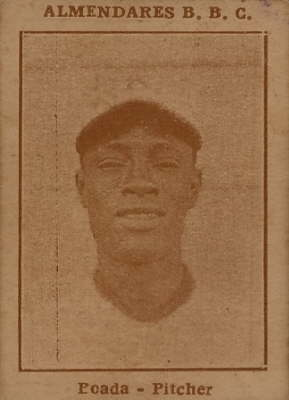
- Pitcher / Outfielder / Third baseman
- Born: 1893; Matanzas, Cuba
- Died: Unknown
- Batted: Right Threw: Right

Negro league baseball debut
- 1919, for the Cuban Stars (East)

Last appearance
- 1924, for the Cuban Stars (West)
- Stats at Baseball Reference

Teams
- Cuban Stars (East) (1919–1920); Cuban Stars (West) (1921–1924)

Lucas Boada Gómez (born 1893—death date unknown) was a Cuban professional baseball pitcher, outfielder and third baseman in the Negro leagues.

A native of Matanzas, Cuba, Boada played from 1919 to 1924 with the Cuban Stars (East), and the Cuban Stars (West). Additionally, he spent time in the Cuban League with Marianao and Almendares.
