= Aldehuela de Yeltes =

- municipality
- Flag Coat of arms

- Location in Salamanca

- Location in Spain
- Coordinates: 40°39′48″N 6°14′38″W
- Country: Spain
- Autonomous community: Castile and León
- Province: Salamanca
- Comarca: Comarca de Ciudad Rodrigo
- Subcomarca: Campo del Yeltes

Government
  - Mayor: José Andrés Suárez Piña (Spanish Socialist Workers' Party)

Area
  - Total: 60 km^{2} (23 sq mi)
- Elevation: 832 m (2,730 ft)

Population (2025-01-01)
  - Total: 176
  - Density: 2.9/km^{2} (7.6/sq mi)
- Time zone: UTC+1 (CET)
  - Summer (DST): UTC+2 (CEST)
- Postal code: 37639
- Website: aldehueladeyeltes.com

Aldehuela de Yeltes is a village and municipality in the province of Salamanca, western Spain, part of the autonomous community of Castile and León. It is located 63 kilometres (39 mi) from the city of Salamanca and has a population of 208 people. The municipality has an area of 60 km^{2} (23 sq mi)

The village lies 832 metres (2,730 ft) above sea level.
