= Aldeia da Ponte =

- Civil parish
- Location in Portugal
- Coordinates: 40.413°N 6.869°W
- Country: Portugal
- Region: Centro
- Intermunic. comm.: Beiras e Serra da Estrela
- District: Guarda
- Municipality: Sabugal

Area
  - Total: 36.69 km^{2} (14.17 sq mi)

Population (2011)
  - Total: 317
  - Density: 8.6/km^{2} (22/sq mi)
- Time zone: UTC+00:00 (WET)
  - Summer (DST): UTC+01:00 (WEST)
- Website: www.aldeiadaponte.com

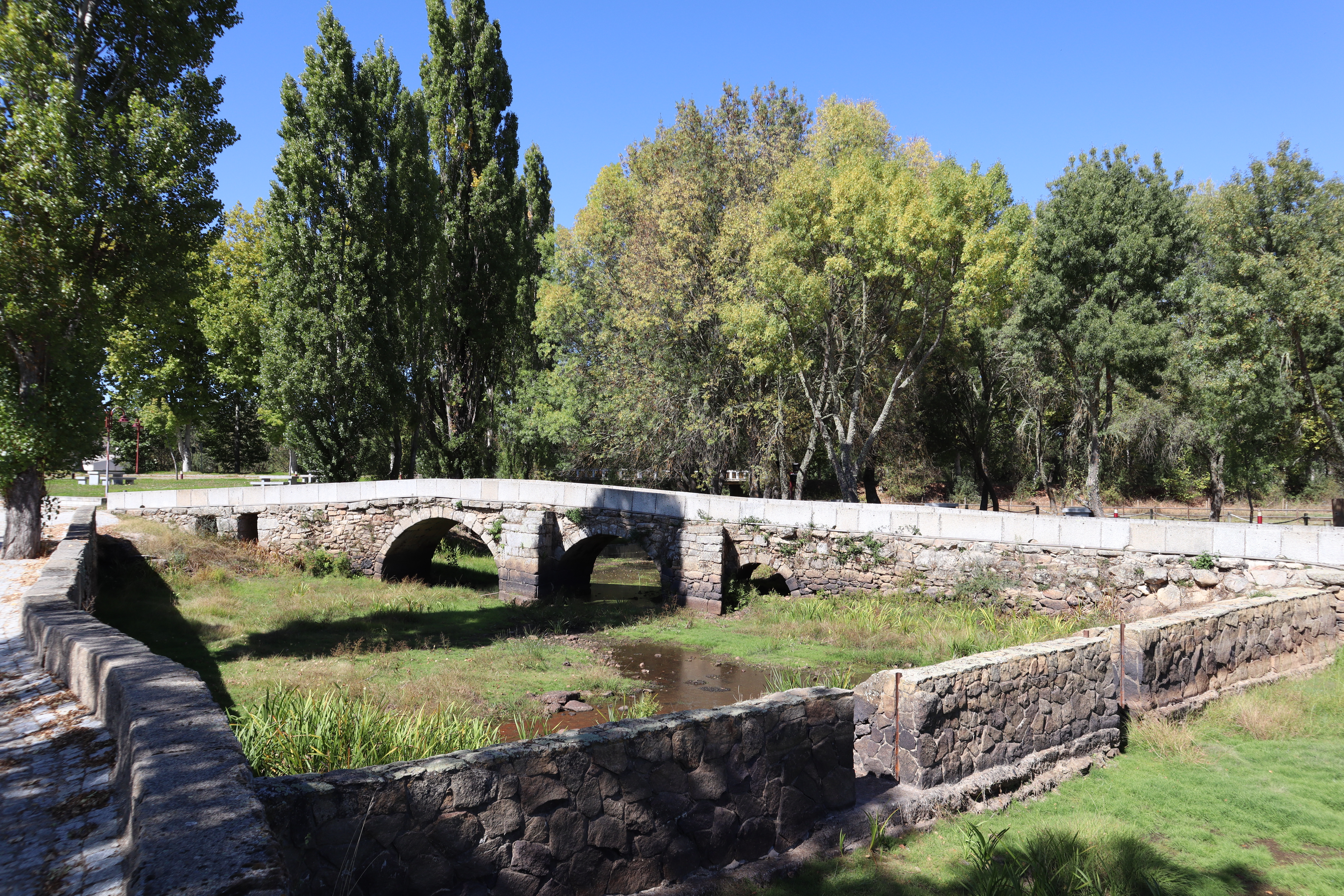

Aldeia da Ponte is a village in the District of Guarda and part of the Sabugal Municipality, Portugal. The population in 2011 was 317, in an area of 36.69 km².

== Geographical situation ==
Aldeia da Ponte is located in the Beira-Alta area, halfway between two cities: Vilar Formoso in the Northeast and Sabugal in Southwest.

The village is crossed by the Cesarâo River (known also under the name of Ribeira of Aldeia), an affluent of the Coâ River which crosses the Beira-Alta area from south to north.
