= Peñaparda =

- Municipality
- Coat of arms

- Location in Salamanca
- Coordinates: 40°19′15″N 6°40′13″W
- Country: Spain
- Autonomous community: Castile and León
- Province: Salamanca
- Comarca: Comarca de Ciudad Rodrigo
- Subcomarca: El Rebollar

Government
  - Mayor: Camila Vizarro Andrés (People's Party)

Area
  - Total: 62 km^{2} (24 sq mi)
- Elevation: 860 m (2,820 ft)

Population (2025-01-01)
  - Total: 298
  - Density: 4.8/km^{2} (12/sq mi)
- Time zone: UTC+1 (CET)
  - Summer (DST): UTC+2 (CEST)
- Postal code: 37523

Peñaparda is a municipality located in the province of Salamanca, Castile and León, Spain. As of 2016 the municipality has a population of 370 inhabitants.
