= El Payo =

- Municipality
- Coat of arms

- Location in Salamanca

- Location in Spain
- Coordinates: 40°17′15″N 6°43′36″W
- Country: Spain
- Autonomous community: Castile and León
- Province: Salamanca
- Comarca: Comarca de Ciudad Rodrigo
- Subcomarca: El Rebollar

Government
  - Mayor: Agapito Pascual Silva (PSOE)

Area
  - Total: 62 km^{2} (24 sq mi)
- Elevation: 934 m (3,064 ft)

Population (2025-01-01)
  - Total: 302
  - Density: 4.9/km^{2} (13/sq mi)
- Time zone: UTC+1 (CET)
  - Summer (DST): UTC+2 (CEST)
- Postal code: 37524

El Payo (Payu in Leonese) is a village and municipality in the province of Salamanca, western Spain, part of the autonomous community of Castile-Leon. It is located 135 kilometres (84 mi) from the provincial capital city of Salamanca and has a population of 37 people.

== Geography ==
The municipality covers an area of 62 km^{2} (24 sq mi). It lies 934 metres (3,064 ft) above sea level and the postal code is 37524.

== See also ==
- List of municipalities in Salamanca
