= Tenebrón =

- Municipality
- Location in Salamanca
- Coordinates: 40°37′26″N 6°21′18″W
- Country: Spain
- Autonomous community: Castile and León
- Province: Salamanca
- Comarca: Comarca de Ciudad Rodrigo
- Subcomarca: Campo del Yeltes

Government
  - Mayor: José María Lobato Merino (PSOE)

Area
  - Total: 40 km^{2} (15 sq mi)
- Elevation: 824 m (2,703 ft)

Population (2025-01-01)
  - Total: 123
  - Density: 3.1/km^{2} (8.0/sq mi)
- Time zone: UTC+1 (CET)
  - Summer (DST): UTC+2 (CEST)
- Postal code: 37589

Tenebrón is a municipality located in the province of Salamanca, Castile and León, Spain. As of 2016 the municipality has a population of 160 inhabitants.
