= Puebla de Yeltes =

- Municipality
- Coat of arms

- Location in Salamanca
- Coordinates: 40°37′35″N 6°10′56″W
- Country: Spain
- Autonomous community: Castile and León
- Province: Salamanca
- Comarca: Comarca de Ciudad Rodrigo
- Subcomarca: Campo del Yeltes

Government
  - Mayor: Felix Redondo Becerro (PSOE)

Area
  - Total: 37 km^{2} (14 sq mi)
- Elevation: 979 m (3,212 ft)

Population (2025-01-01)
  - Total: 136
  - Density: 3.7/km^{2} (9.5/sq mi)
- Time zone: UTC+1 (CET)
  - Summer (DST): UTC+2 (CEST)
- Postal code: 37606

Puebla de Yeltes is a village and municipality in the province of Salamanca, western Spain, part of the autonomous community of Castile-Leon. It is located 65 kilometres (40 mi) from the provincial capital city of Salamanca and has a population of 151 people.

== Geography ==
The municipality covers an area of 37 km^{2} (14 sq mi). It lies 979 metres (3,212 ft) above sea level and the postal code is 37606.

== Economy ==
- The basis of the economy is agriculture.

== Culture ==
- List of municipalities in Salamanca
