= Dios le Guarde =

- municipality
- Location in Salamanca

- Location in Spain
- Coordinates: 40°38′33″N 6°18′52″W
- Country: Spain
- Autonomous community: Castile and León
- Province: Salamanca
- Comarca: Comarca de Ciudad Rodrigo
- Subcomarca: Campo del Yeltes

Government
  - Mayor: Luis Sánchez García (People's Party)

Area
  - Total: 16 km^{2} (6.2 sq mi)
- Elevation: 814 m (2,671 ft)

Population (2025-01-01)
  - Total: 116
  - Density: 7.2/km^{2} (19/sq mi)
- Time zone: UTC+1 (CET)
  - Summer (DST): UTC+2 (CEST)
- Postal code: 37478

Dios le Guarde is a village and municipality in the province of Salamanca, western Spain, part of the autonomous community of Castile-Leon. It is located 72 kilometres (45 mi) from the provincial capital city of Salamanca and as of 2016 has a population of 139 people.

== Name ==
The name came from Old Spanish meaning "God's Guard".

== Geography ==
The municipality covers an area of 16 km^{2} (6.2 sq mi). It lies 817 metres (2,680 ft) above sea level and the postal code is 37478.
