= Pastores, Salamanca =

Pastores
- Municipality
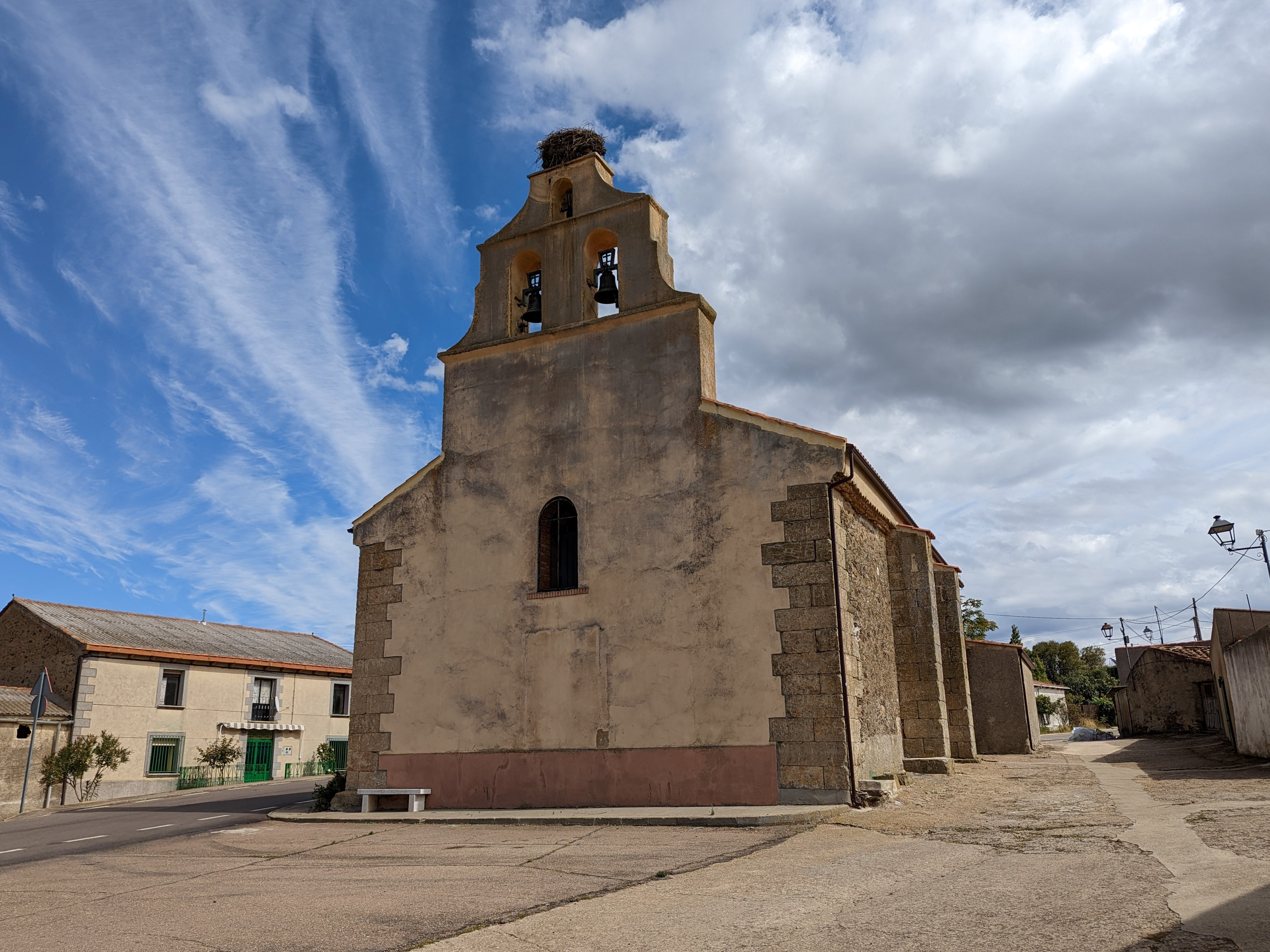
- San Pedro de Alcántara church

- Location in Spain
- Coordinates: 40°30′54″N 6°30′34″W
- Country: Spain
- Autonomous community: Castile and León
- Province: Salamanca
- Comarca: Campo de Robledo

Government
  - Mayor: Ignacio Plaza Esteban (PP)

Area
  - Total: 12.69 km^{2} (4.90 sq mi)
- Elevation: 764 m (2,507 ft)

Population (2025-01-01)
  - Total: 52
  - Density: 4.1/km^{2} (11/sq mi)
- Time zone: UTC+1 (CET)
  - Summer (DST): UTC+2 (CEST)
- Postal code: 37512

Pastores is a municipality in the province of Salamanca, western Spain, part of the autonomous community of Castile-Leon.

The municipality is formed by the town of Pastores and the uninhabited Cuadrados, which occupies a total area of 12.69 km² and according to the demographic data collected in 2017, it has a population of 54.

The village lies 764 meters above sea level and the postal code is 37512.

== Demographics ==
Historical population
Year	1900	1910	1920	1930	1940	1950	1960	1970	1981	1991	2000	2016
Pop.	254	272	240	279	329	352	329	202	114	72	56	64
±%	—	+7.1%	−11.8%	+16.3%	+17.9%	+7.0%	−6.5%	−38.6%	−43.6%	−36.8%	−22.2%	+14.3%
