= Puebla de Azaba =

- Municipality
- Location in Salamanca
- Coordinates: 40°26′51″N 6°44′52″W
- Country: Spain
- Autonomous community: Castile and León
- Province: Salamanca
- Comarca: Comarca de Ciudad Rodrigo
- Subcomarca: Campo de Argañán

Government
  - Mayor: José Luis González Díaz (People's Party)

Area
  - Total: 26 km^{2} (10 sq mi)
- Elevation: 670 m (2,200 ft)

Population (2025-01-01)
  - Total: 145
  - Density: 5.6/km^{2} (14/sq mi)
- Time zone: UTC+1 (CET)
  - Summer (DST): UTC+2 (CEST)
- Postal code: 37553

Puebla de Azaba is a municipality located in the province of Salamanca, Castile and León, Spain.

== See also ==
- List of municipalities in Salamanca
