= Villar de Ciervo =

- Municipality
- Coat of arms

- Location in Salamanca
- Coordinates: 40°44′1″N 6°44′0″W
- Country: Spain
- Autonomous community: Castile and León
- Province: Salamanca
- Comarca: Comarca de Ciudad Rodrigo
- Subcomarca: Campo de Argañán

Government
  - Mayor: Álvaro Sánchez Estevez (People's Party)

Area
  - Total: 57 km^{2} (22 sq mi)
- Elevation: 679 m (2,228 ft)

Population (2025-01-01)
  - Total: 253
  - Density: 4.4/km^{2} (11/sq mi)
- Time zone: UTC+1 (CET)
  - Summer (DST): UTC+2 (CEST)
- Postal code: 37488

Villar de Ciervo is a municipality located in the province of Salamanca, Castile and León, Spain. As of 2016 the municipality has a population of 289 inhabitants.
