= Boada, Salamanca =

Boada
- Municipality
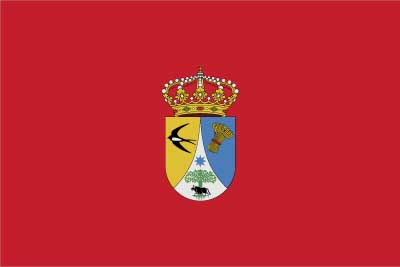
- Flag Coat of arms

- Location in Salamanca

- Location in Spain
- Coordinates: 40°48′58″N 6°18′21″W
- Country: Spain
- Autonomous community: Castile and León
- Province: Salamanca
- Comarca: Comarca de Ciudad Rodrigo
- Subcomarca: Campo del Yeltes

Government
  - Mayor: Juan Matias Garzón Martín (PSOE)

Area
  - Total: 30 km^{2} (12 sq mi)
- Elevation: 779 m (2,556 ft)

Population (2025-01-01)
  - Total: 259
  - Density: 8.6/km^{2} (22/sq mi)
- Time zone: UTC+1 (CET)
  - Summer (DST): UTC+2 (CEST)
- Postal code: 37290

Boada is a village and municipality in the province of Salamanca, western Spain, part of the autonomous community of Castile-Leon. It is 58 kilometres (36 mi) from the provincial capital city of Salamanca and has a population of 297 people.

It lies 779 metres (2,556 ft) above sea level and the postal code is 37290.
