= Fuenteguinaldo =

- Municipality
- Coat of arms

- Location in Salamanca
- Coordinates: 40°25′44″N 6°40′36″W
- Country: Spain
- Autonomous community: Castile and León
- Province: Salamanca
- Comarca: Comarca de Ciudad Rodrigo
- Subcomarca: Campo de Robledo

Government
  - Mayor: Dionisio Sánchez Sánchez (PSOE)

Area
  - Total: 102 km^{2} (39 sq mi)
- Elevation: 860 m (2,820 ft)

Population (2025-01-01)
  - Total: 635
  - Density: 6.23/km^{2} (16.1/sq mi)
- Time zone: UTC+1 (CET)
  - Summer (DST): UTC+2 (CEST)
- Postal code: 37540

Fuenteguinaldo is a village and large municipality in the province of Salamanca, western Spain, part of the autonomous community of Castile-Leon. It is located 111 kilometres (69 mi) from the provincial capital city of Salamanca and has a population of 860 people.

== Geography ==
The municipality covers an area of 102 km^{2} (39 sq mi). It lies 860 metres (2,820 ft) above sea level and the postal code is 37540.

== See also ==
- List of municipalities in Salamanca
