= Spanish Bowls =

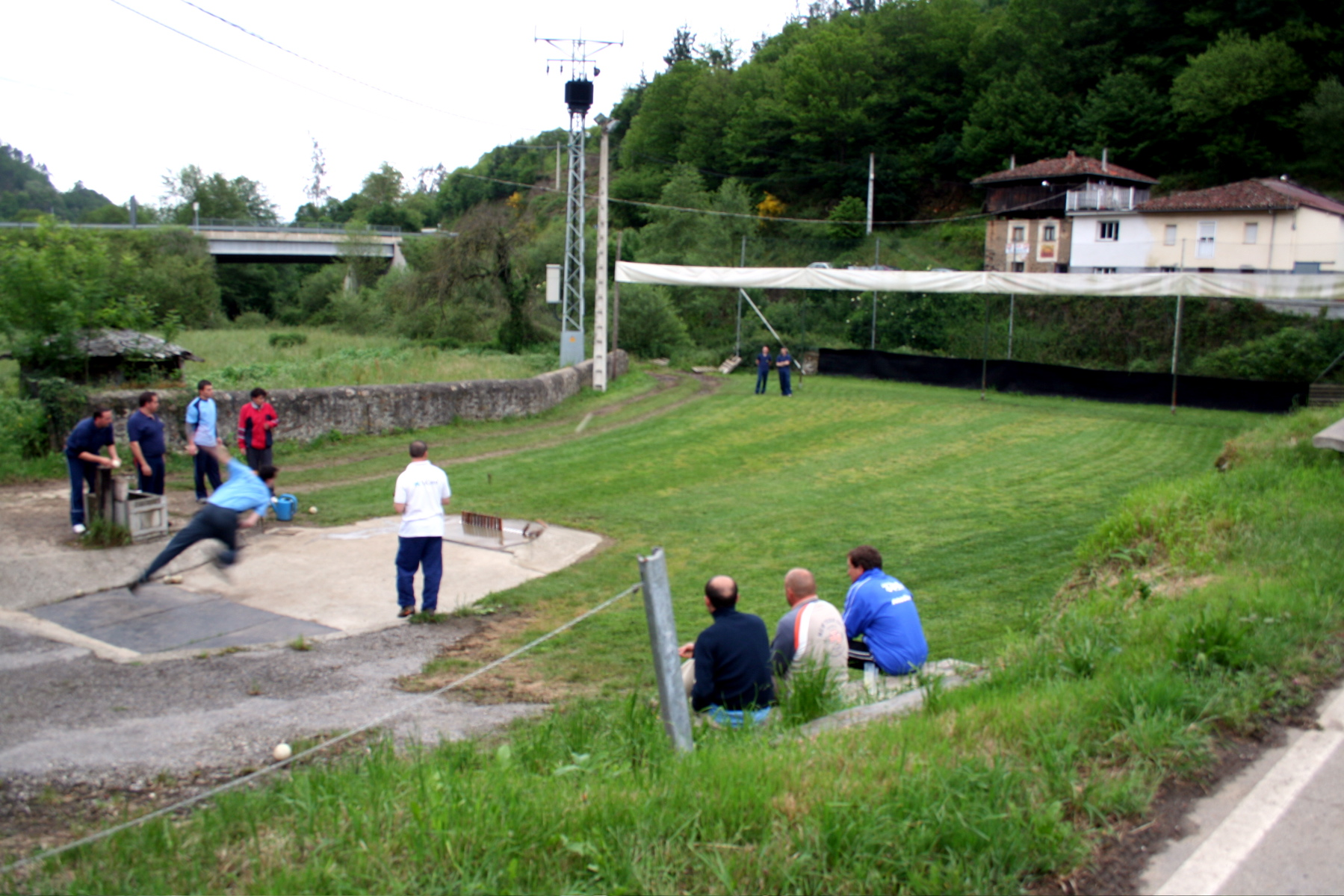
Bowling field in Asturias

The origins of bowling in Spain are uncertain, but legend says that over a thousand years ago, in ancient Castile, the Highlanders bet their weapons and even their war horses in contested and passionate bowls matches. It is even said that the warring Cantabrians that inhabited the north of Spain challenged each other in bowling matches.

There are many different bowls games around Spain (more than 20) but Cantabria, Castile and León, Basque Country, and Asturias, have the greatest variety. One of the most spectacular games are the "Bolos Tres Tablones" (bowls three boards), which is originally from Las Merindades, in the north of Spain. Andalusian bowling is a traditional game in Sierras de Cazorla, Segura y Las Villas Natural Park.

The bowling alley is divided into three different areas: The launching area, pin area and "Birle" area. The bowling balls have finger and hand-holes, are 26–28 cm in diameter and usually weight between 6 and 8 kg. There are three boards (tablones or cureñas) and three pins on each one; there is a small pin which is situated outside of the boards, which is the most important.

The game starts by throwing the bowling ball from the launching area (cas) through the air, trying to bring down as many pins as possible, including the small pin, or (mico). The first bounce of the bowling ball must be in the board, otherwise it will be cancelled (morra) and the bowler won't get any points. Scoring is as follows: each regular pin knocked down its worth one point, and the medium pin is worth two points. Knocking over the small pin (mico) is worth four points, but only if another pin has been knocked down.
