= Extremadurans =

People from Extremadura, Spain

Total population
- (2022) 1 572 667 (All Spain)

Regions with significant populations
- Extremadura, Spain

Languages
- Majority: Spanish (Castúo); Minority: Extremaduran, Fala, Portuguese

Religion
- Roman Catholicism

Related ethnic groups
- Portuguese, other Spaniards (Castilians, Leonese, Asturians, Galicians, Andalusians), Mirandese

Extremadurans (Spanish: extremeños, Extremaduran: estremeñus, Portuguese: estremenhos) are the native people of Extremadura, in the central-west of Spain.

The dialect of Extremadura belongs to the southern dialects of Spanish, with strong similarities to the speech from Andalusia or Murcian. However, in northern Extremadura these southern features merge with some Leonese features, forming the Extremaduran language, which is nowadays seriously endangered. In the rest of the territory, the influence of Leonese on the language is marginal.

There are some towns or villages in Extremadura where Portuguese is spoken, such as Olivenza, Cedillo and Herrera de Alcántara. Olivenza and Cedillo belonged to Portugal until two centuries ago, but Herrera de Alcántara never did.

In three villages located in a small valley of the northwestern part of Extremadura near the border with Portugal, the Fala language is spoken, which is a Romance language from the Galician-Portuguese subgroup mixed with Extremaduran.

Historically, Extremadura has long been one of the poorest regions in the country. As a result, many of its people emigrated to Latin America during the colonial era (1492–1820s), leaving a mark on Latin music in the Americas ever since.

== See also ==
- Extremadura
- Nationalities and regions of Spain
- Languages of Spain
- Extremaduran language
- Castúo
- Fala language
- Extremaduran cuisine
- Music of Extremadura
