= Asturleonese language =

Romance language spoken in Spain and Portugal

Asturleonese
- Asturlleonés, Asturllionés, Asturḷḷionés, Sturlhionés, Sturlionés, Asturlionés
- Geographic distribution: Spain (Asturias, northwestern and northern Castile and León); Northeastern Portugal (Tierra de Miranda and some villages in the Riudenor and Deilon parishes); As transitional variants, western Cantabria, northwestern Extremadura and southwestern Castile and León
- Ethnicity: Asturians, Leonese people, Mirandese people, Cantabrians, Extremadurans
- Linguistic classification: Indo-European: Italic; Latino-Faliscan; Latin; Romance; Italo-Western; Western; Ibero-Romance; West Iberian; Asturleonese
- Early forms: Old Latin: Vulgar Latin; Proto-Romance; Old Leonese
- Subdivisions: Asturian; Leonese; Mirandese; Extremaduran; Cantabrian

Language codes
- ISO 639-2 / 5: ast, mwl, ext
- ISO 639-3: ast, mwl, ext
- Glottolog: astu1244 Asturo-Leonese astu1245 Asturian-Leonese-Cantabrian extr1243 Extremaduran mira1251 Mirandese
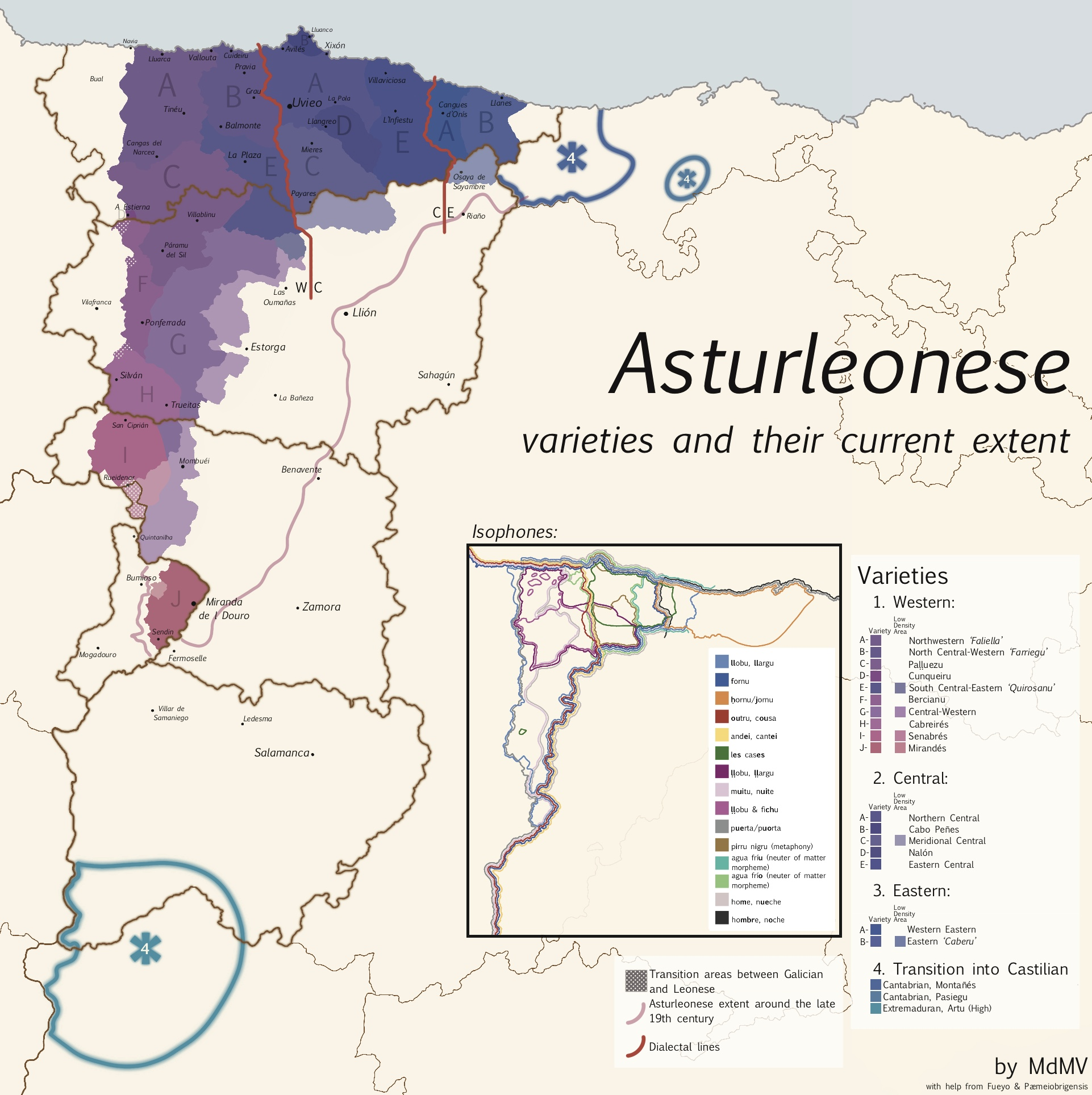
- The current extent of the Asturleonese varieties

- Asturleonese is classified as Definitely Endangered by the UNESCO Atlas of the World's Languages in Danger.

Asturleonese is an Ibero-Romance language or language cluster spoken in northwestern Spain and northeastern Portugal, namely in the historical regions and Spain's modern-day autonomous communities of Asturias, northwestern Castile and León, Cantabria and Extremadura, and in Riudenore and Tierra de Miranda in Portugal. The name "Asturleonese" is largely uncommon among its native speakers, as it forms a dialect continuum of mutually intelligible varieties and therefore it is primarily referred to by their glossonyms – Asturian, Leonese, Cantabrian, Extremaduran, and Mirandese. Asturleonese has been classified by UNESCO as an endangered language, as the varieties are being increasingly replaced by Spanish and Portuguese.

Phylogenetically, Asturleonese belongs to the West Iberian branch of the Romance languages that gradually developed from Vulgar Latin in the old Kingdom of León. The Asturleonese group is typically subdivided into three linguistic areas (Western, Central and Eastern) that form the vertical Asturleonese region, from Asturias, through León, to the north of Portugal and Extremadura. Eastern Cantabrian and southern Extremaduran have transitional traits with the northern peninsular and Castúo dialects of Spanish respectively. There are differing degrees of vitality of the language for each region in the area; Asturias and Miranda do Douro have historically been the regions in which Asturleonese has been the best preserved.

Asturleonese was once regarded as an informal dialect (basilect) that developed from Castilian Spanish, but Ramón Menéndez Pidal's El dialecto leonés ('The Leonese dialect'), published in 1906, demonstrated that it developed from Latin independently, coming into its earliest distinguishable form in the old Kingdom of León. As is noted by the Spanish scholar Inés Fernández Ordóñez, Menéndez Pidal always maintained that the Spanish language (or "the common Spanish language" as he sometimes described it) evolved from a Castilian base which would have absorbed, or merged with, Leonese and Aragonese. In his works Historia de la Lengua Española ('History of the Spanish language') and especially El español en sus primeros tiempos ('Spanish in its early times'), Menéndez Pidal explains the stages of this process, taking into account the influence Leonese and Aragonese had on the beginnings of modern Spanish.

== History ==
The Asturleonese language originated from Latin, which began to be transmitted through the Roman legions in Asturica Augusta as well as the Roman Sixth (Hispanian) Legion. The adoption of Latin by the Astures, who inhabited the area, was a slow but inevitable process, as the use of the colonial language was the key to obtaining equal rights; the most important priority, at the time, being to earn Roman citizenship. However, like the rest of the peninsula, it was not until the establishment of the Germanic kingdoms of Iberia that Latin came to be the commonly spoken language of the area.

Along with many linguistic similarities to Latin, the Asturian language also has distinct characteristics that can be linked back to the Cantabrian Wars, a conflict in which the former inhabitants of Leon and Asturias fought against the incorporation of the Roman culture. These two linguistic influences, together with the expansion and the subsequent regression of vernacular languages, would determine the linguistic evolution in the northwestern part of the peninsula. The vocabulary of Asturleonese contains pre-romanic elements that survived the later romanization of the area, as well as including pre-Indoeuropean elements that were only maintained through toponymy.

== Diglossia ==
In the 12th, 13th, and 14th centuries, Latin and Asturleonese (in its Old Leonese form) co-existed within a diglossic relationship. At that time, Asturleonese was used in official documents and held a high legal status, a status that would drastically change within the following centuries. In the period of time between the fifteenth and eighteenth centuries, most local dialects were marginalized within the Iberian Peninsula as well as other parts of Europe, making it difficult for some languages, such as Asturleonese, to survive, and resulting in the fragmentation of other linguistic varieties.

In the nineteenth century, Spanish thrived as a language of prestige and culture, which led to it progressively replacing Asturleonese, as well as Galician in neighboring Galicia, with those languages mostly relegated to oral usage. Consequently, there existed, and still exists, a distinct divide between the spoken languages of Spanish and Asturian and the written ones.

Diglossia still exists today in Asturias. While Spanish is the official language, being used in the government and political spheres, the Asturian language survives as the language mainly used in informal and casual conversation in many rural areas within this community. Additionally, the language is often offered as an elective subject in schools throughout the linguistic region.

== Legal status ==
Asturleonese only recently received recognition in the municipality of Miranda do Douro by virtue of Portuguese law 7/99 on 29 January 1999, although merely as a language that should continue to be protected and preserved, not awarding it any official status. Meanwhile, Catalan, Basque, and Galician were all granted official status in their respective regions in 1978. Therefore, there exists some tension, as Asturleonese is still not regarded as an official language today. However, the language is optional at school, where it is widely studied.

The Spanish Constitution recognizes the existence of vehicular languages and the need for the protection of existing dialects within the national territories. In article 3.3 of the constitution, the document concretely states that "the richness of the distinct linguistic modalities of Spain is a cultural heritage that will be the subject of special respect and protection." Additionally, article 4 of the Asturian Statute of Autonomy states that, "The Asturian language will enjoy protection. Its use, teaching and diffusion in the media will be furthered, whilst its local dialects and voluntary apprenticeship will always be respected." In light of these stated provisions of the 1/1998, on the 23 March, the Use and Promotion of the Asturleonese Language serves this purpose; promoting the use of the language, its knowledge within the educational system, as well as its dissemination in media. However, Asturleonese continues to have a very limited presence in the public administration.

In Portugal, the related Mirandese dialect is recognized by the Assembly of the Republic as a co-official language along with Portuguese for local matters, and it is taught in public schools in the few areas where Mirandese is natively spoken. Initially thought to be a basilect of Portuguese, José Leite de Vasconcelos studied Mirandese and concluded it was a separate language from Portuguese.

== Geographic distribution ==
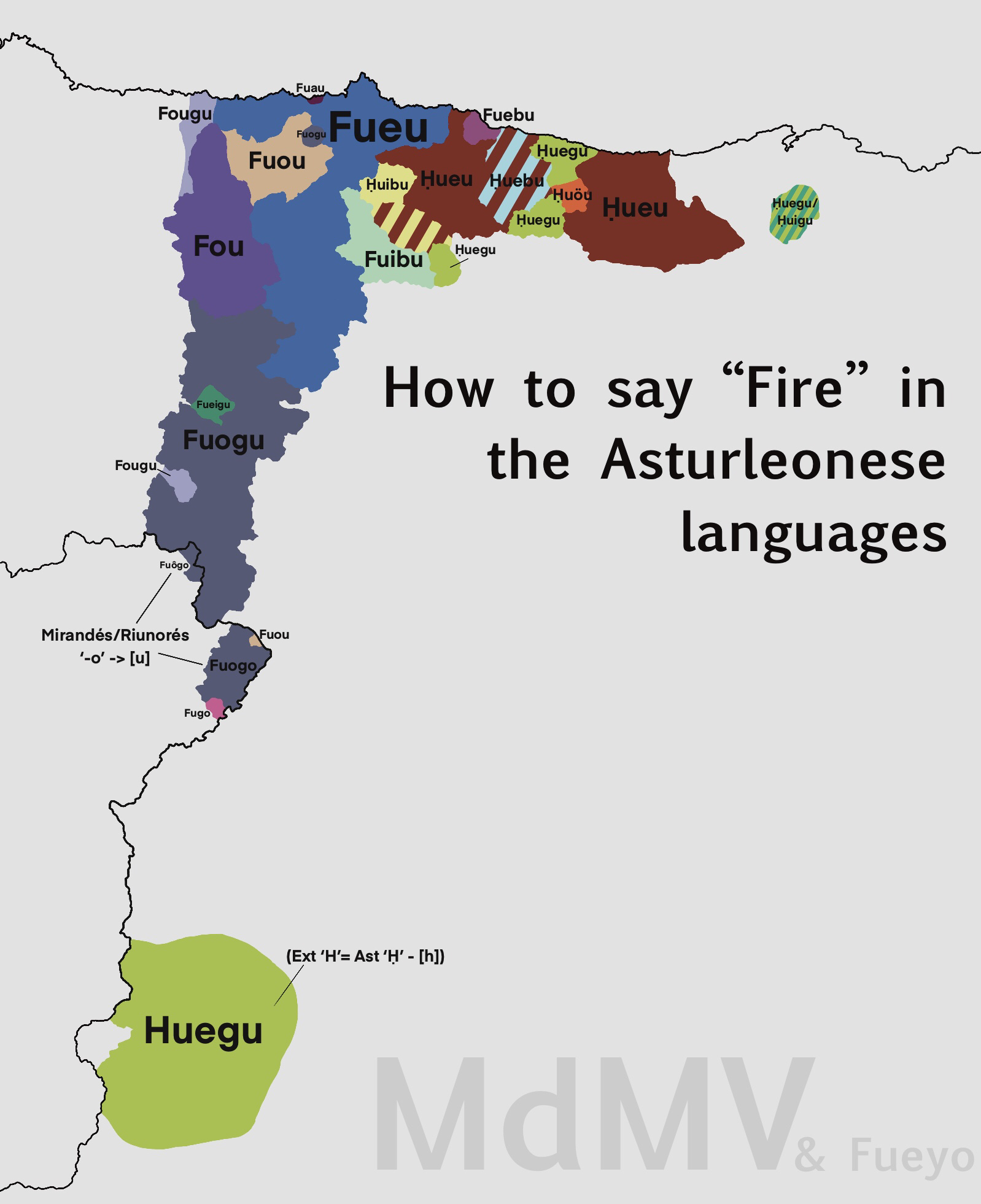
How to say 'Fire' in the Asturleonese language(s)

Linguistically, it is considered that within the dominion of Asturleonese, the known dialects such as Leonese, Asturian, or Mirandese form a macrolanguage. A macrolanguage is a language that exists as distinct linguistic varieties. Within this macrolanguage, the Western and Eastern dialects share some linguistic characteristics with Galaicoportuguese and Spanish respectively.

The boundaries of the Asturleonese language extend through Asturias, Leon, Zamora, and Miranda do Douro. However, the language is not just the sum of Asturian, Leonese, Zamorano, and Mirandan dialects; in purely linguistic terms, the main divisions of Asturleonese have north–south boundaries and form three separate sections that are shared between Asturias and Leon: occidental, central, and oriental. Only through a second level of analysis were smaller sections able to be distinguished. The political and administrative entities and linguistic spaces rarely coincide, as it is most common that languages go beyond borders and do not coincide with them.

== Usage of glossonyms ==
Given the low social and political acceptance of referring to the language in Asturias as Leonese, and in other parts of the domain (such as León or Zamora) as Asturian (even though it is virtually the same language), a significant part of the authors and specialists prefer to refer to all the dialects collectively as Asturllionés or Asturleonés, although others continue to use the regional terms (like Leonese, Asturian, Mirandese, etc.).

=== Asturian (Asturianu) ===
An Asturian speaker

Much effort has been made since 1974 to protect and promote Asturian. In 1981 Asturian, or Bable, as the language is officially named, was recognized as a language in need of special protection by the local government. In 1994 there were 100,000 first language speakers and 450,000 second language speakers able to speak or understand Asturian. However, the outlook for Asturian remains critical, with a large decline in the number of speakers in the last 100 years. At the end of the 20th century, the Academia de la Llingua Asturiana undertook initiatives designed to provide the language with most of the tools needed to survive in the modern era: a grammar, a dictionary and periodicals. A new generation of Asturian writers has championed the language. These developments have given Asturian greater hope of survival.

=== Leonese (Llionés) ===
A Leonese speaker, recorded in Spain

Leonese was probably spoken in a much larger area in the Middle Ages, roughly corresponding to the old Kingdom of León. As the Castilian language became the main language in Spain, the linguistic features of the Leonese language retreated progressively westwards. In the late 1990s several associations unofficially promoted Leonese language courses. In 2001 the Universidad de León (University of León) created a course for Leonese teachers, and local and provincial governments developed Leonese language courses for adults. Nowadays Leonese can be studied in the largest towns of León, Zamora and Salamanca provinces.

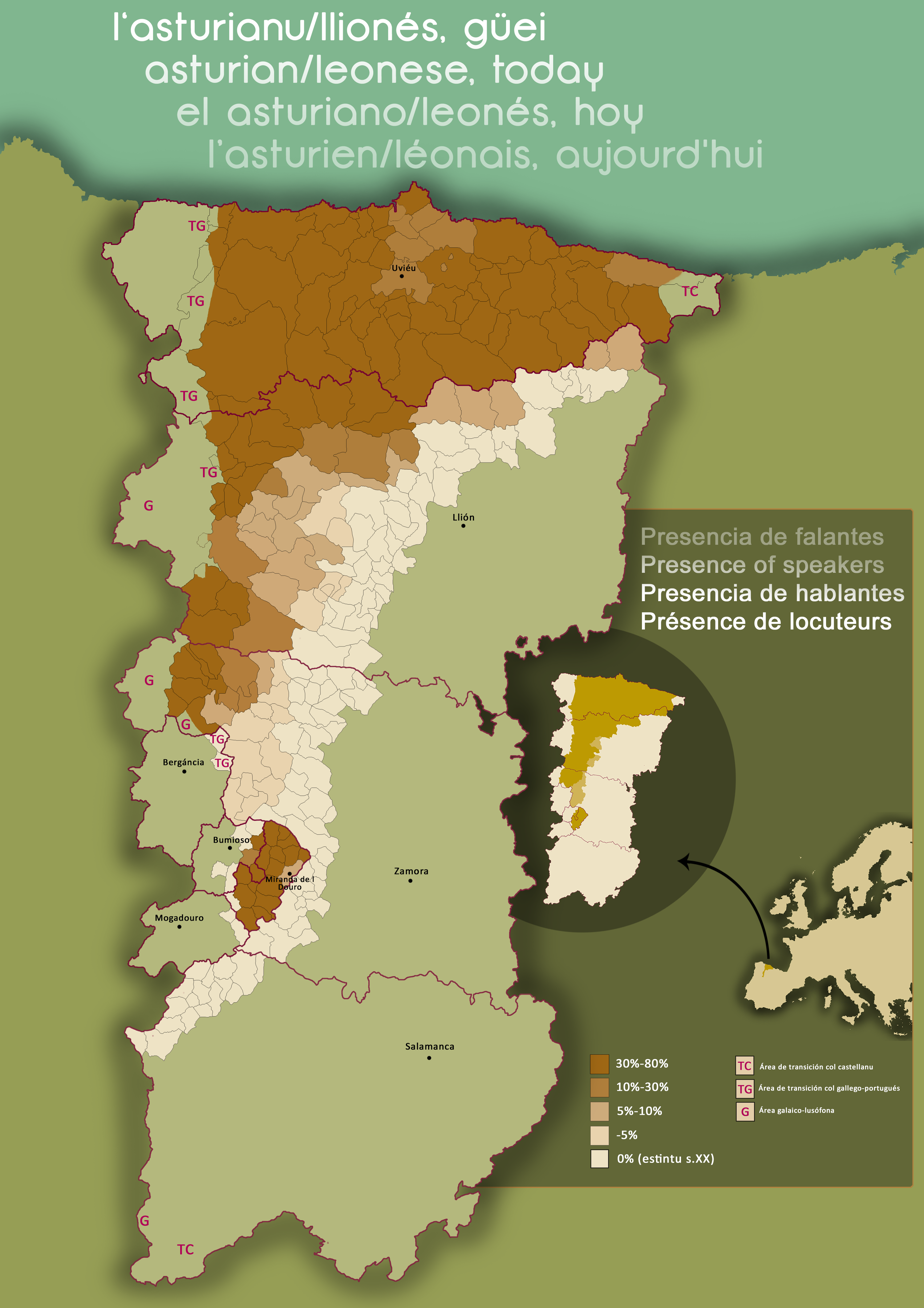
Usage of Asturleonese today, excluding transitional speeches

Leonese's desperate reality as a minority language has driven it to an apparent dead end, and it is considered a Seriously Endangered Language by UNESCO. There are some efforts at language revival aimed at the urban population (the Leonese Council has made campaign to encourage young people to learn Leonese). Some experts think Leonese will be dead in two generations.

In spite of all these difficulties, the number of young people learning and using Leonese (mainly as a written language) has increased substantially in recent years. The Leonese City Council promotes Leonese language courses for adults. Leonese is taught in sixteen schools in Leon.

Leonese has special status in the Statute of Autonomy of Castile and León.

=== Mirandese (Mirandés) ===
In the 19th century, José Leite de Vasconcelos described Mirandese as "the language of the farms, work, home, and love between the Mirandese," noting that it was a fully separate language from Portuguese. Since 1986/87 the language has been taught to students, now being taught from 1st to 12th grade. Today Mirandese has only 3500 speakers.

Portugal took a further step in protecting Mirandese when the Portuguese Republic officially recognised the language in 1999. It is administered by the Anstituto de la Lhéngua Mirandesa.

== Number of speakers ==
There is no known, exact number of Asturleonese speakers, as not enough statistical research has been conducted in this area and many dialects are not accounted for due to their close similarities with Spanish. It is believed that there are over 100,000 Asturian speakers within Spain and Portugal. However, a study conducted in 1991 on the specific Asturian dialect, showed that there could be as many as 450,000 speakers within the Asturias region, with about 60,000 to 80,000 able to read and write the language. The same study indicated that another 24 percent of the population could understand Asturian. This also explains the diverse range of knowledge and familiarity that those within the region have of the Asturleonese language, as there exist some speakers, some who can only understand the language, and a very small portion of the population who are able to read and write.
