= The Beggars of Burgos =

Painting by Gustave Doré

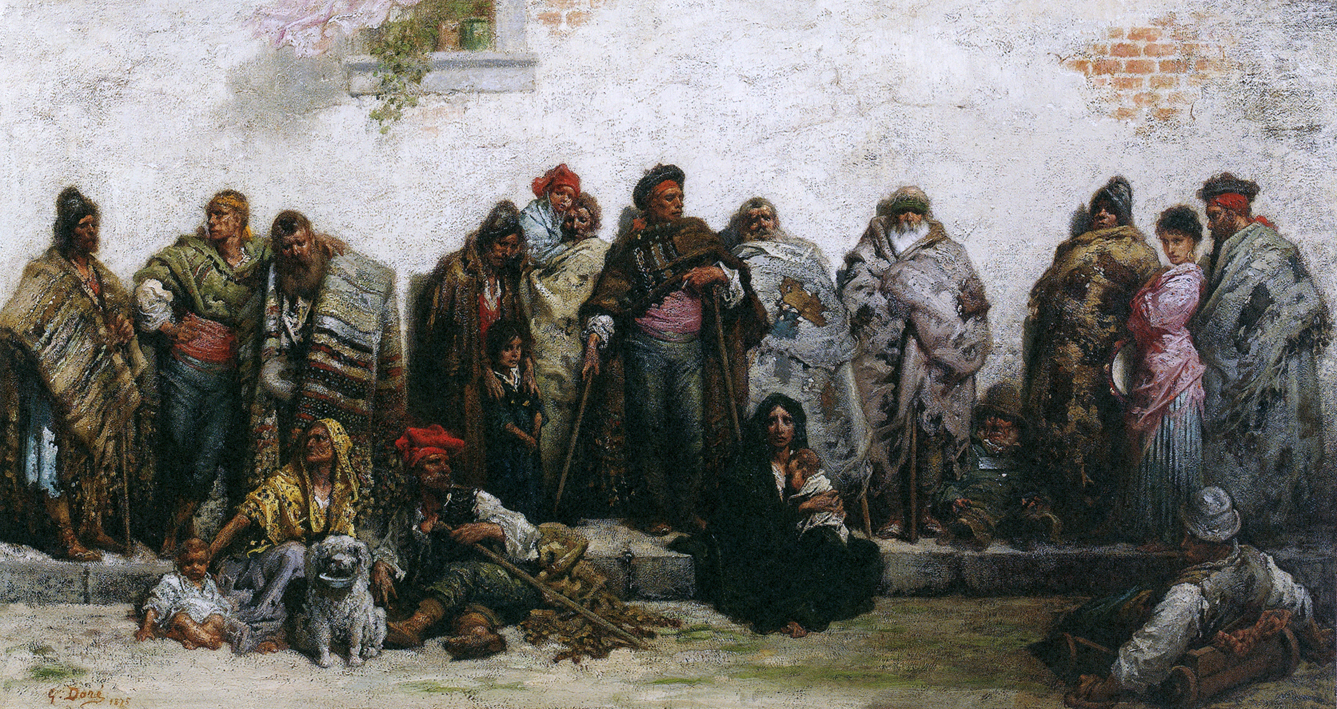
- Artist: Gustave Doré
- Year: 1875
- Medium: Oil on canvas
- Dimensions: 64 cm × 119 cm (25 in × 47 in)
- Location: Private collection

The Beggars of Burgos (Les mendiants de Burgos) is an oil-on-canvas painting created in 1875 by French artist Gustave Doré. It was sold in 2012 by Galerie Michel Descours. It is now in a private collection.

== Description ==
The Beggars of Burgos shows a group of Castilian beggars clustered before a whitewashed wall as though they have assembled for a portrait. Most are dressed in tattered blankets, threadbare shawls, and disheveled clothing, though some wear colorful sashes and hats. A young mother, perhaps a recent widow, sits alone holding her infant. A crippled man lies in a small wooden wagon, his hands wrapped in leather or rags. Near the center, a tall man leans on walking sticks; one family with two small children stands to his left, while a couple sprawl on the sidewalk with an infant and a dog. Other beggars seen at the edges of the painting include a woman with a tambourine and several men who may have once been soldiers or tradesmen fallen on hard times.
