= Old Leonese language =

West Iberian language spoken in the Kingdom of León

Old Leonese
- romançe, romançio, vulgar
- Region: Kingdom of León
- Ethnicity: Asturians; Leonese; Mirandese
- Era: Evolved into the current Asturleonese varieties by 1500
- Language family: Indo-European: Italic; Latino-Faliscan; Latin; Romance; Italo-Western; Western; Ibero-Romance; West Iberian; Old Leonese
- Early forms: Old Latin: Vulgar Latin; Proto-Romance

Language codes
- ISO 639-3: –
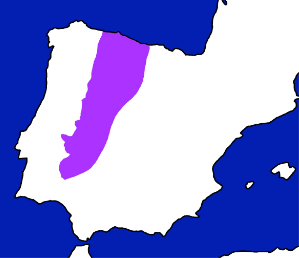
- The extent of the language around the 13th to 14th centuries

Old Leonese, Medieval Leonese, Medieval Asturian or Medieval Asturleonese was a West Iberian dialect of Vulgar Latin spoken in several regions of the Kingdom of León, including the medieval Principality of Asturias. It is the direct ancestor of current Asturleonese varieties. Old Leonese was spoken until around the year 1500, and was attested starting from the 10th century with the Nodicia de kesos.

== Geographical extent ==
The exact borders and limits of the Leonese dominium are still discussed, various authors have proposed different limits. Ramón Menéndez Pidal proposed in his 1906 El Dialecto Leonés that Leonese once occupied all of the región of León, Asturias (excluding Eo-Navia) Cantabria and Western Extremadura.

Xulio Viejo identified the maximum extent of Asturleonese with the ancient Conventus Asturum^{(es)} and subsequent Diocese of Astorga. As such the western border of Old Leonese would be the Navia river, the eastern the Purón river^{(es)} (in Asturias) and Cea river (in León) and the southern the Duero river, holding that Leonese was not really spoken further south or east, only receiving a small influence from their time under the Kingdom of León, which was short and soon outmatched by the growing influence from Castile.

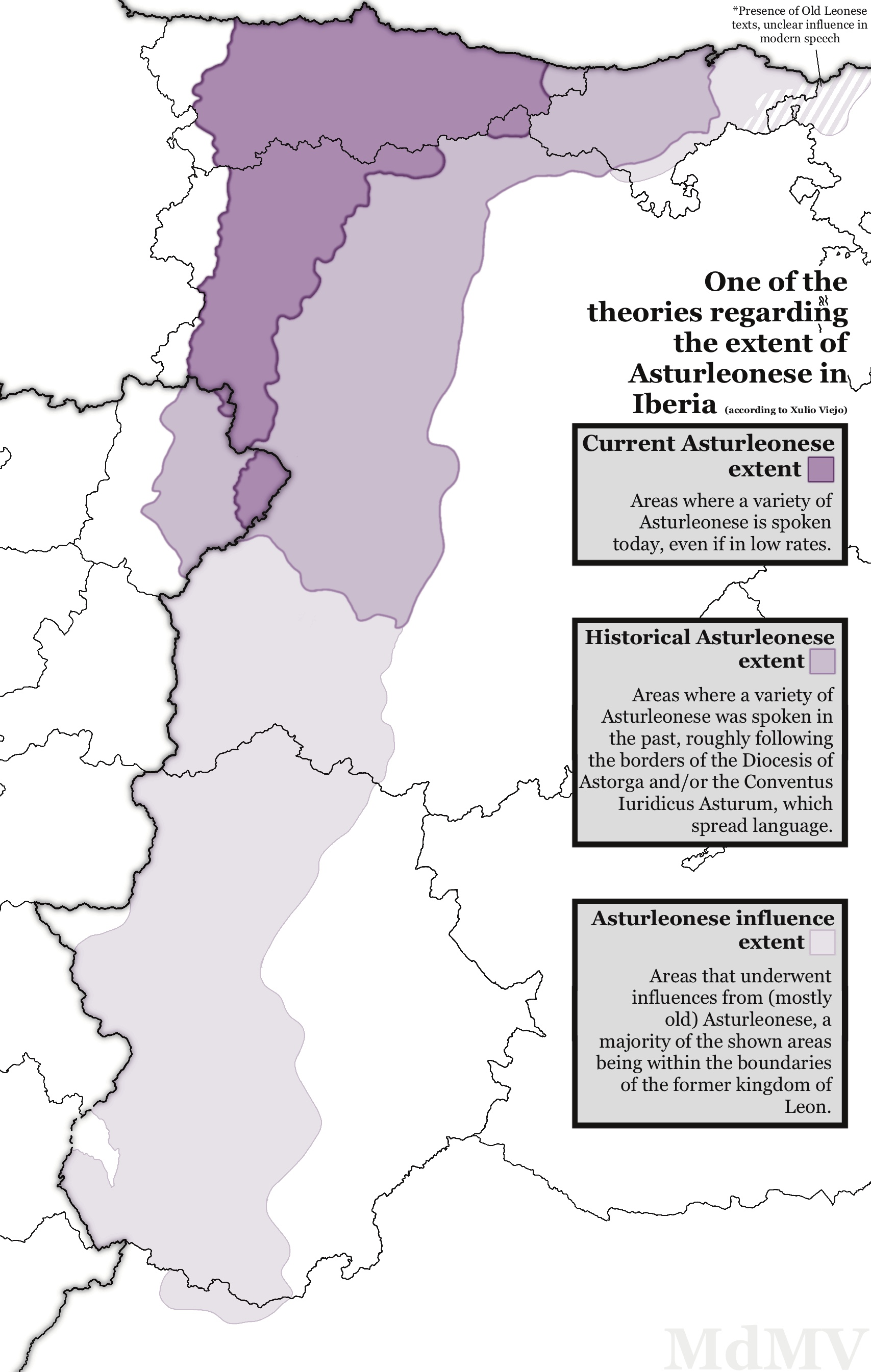
Xulio’s theory of the extent of Old Leonese in medieval Iberia

== Phonology ==
=== Consonants ===
==== Consonant Inventory ====
Hector García Gil (2009)
		Labial	Dental	(Denti-)Alveolar	(Pre-)Palatal		Velar
Nasal		m		n	ɲ		
Stop/Affricate	voiceless	p	t	t͡s	t͡ʃ		k
Stop/Affricate	voiced	b	d	d͡z			ɡ
Fricative	voiceless			s	ʃ		
Fricative	voiced			z	ʒ	ʝ	
Lateral				l	ʎ		
Trill				r			
Flap				ɾ			

- The sound change [ʎ] to [ʝ] in weak contexts may appear in Old East and Central Leonese (such as in muyer and meyor). According to some researchers, this trait might have contributed to the spread of yeísmo in Castilian, brought by Asturian and Leonese settlers.
- The distinction between /d͡z/ {z} and /t͡s/ {c, ç}, seems to have begun fading early, especially in Asturias, where the /t͡s/ (ç) sound was often written as /d͡z/ (z). An example is mazana /maˈd͡zana/ which appears more often in Asturian documentation than the expected maçana /maˈt͡sana/ (❮Mattiana).

=== Vowels ===
==== Vowel Inventory ====
	Front	Central	Back
Close	i		u
Mid	e		o
Open		a	

- Latin ŏ and ĕ developed in Old Leonese to /we/ and /je/ respectively, such as in puerta. Compare Old Galician-Portuguese porta. Due to Galician-Portuguese influence, many documents don't represent these diphthongs orthographically. This tendency is stronger the western the location the document was forged is and was diminishing by the 13th century, in eastern areas like Sahagún it was already fased out (along with the etymological writing of Latin ll, lj, kl, pl as ll, instead using more frequently a phonetic spelling of i or y). It's more common for ue diphthongs to be represented as o than ie being represented as e. Occasionally, the grapheme uo may be found (such as suolos, Campumanes, 1247 or uoy, 1263).Some texts shown both forms: (bono & bueno, corpo & cuerpo, etc.).

== Literature ==
No known poem or narrative work in Old Leonese has survived until today. However, we conserve a large corpus of legal and ecclesiastical documents from the 11th to 14th century which were produced by the Kingdom of Léon. Beginning in the late 14th century, and completed by the 15th, an administrative and church castilianization, boosted by the Castilian Trastámara dynasty ended all writing in Leonese, and prompted Asturleonese into the so-called Sieglos Escuros ("Dark Centuries"). Even then, some traces of Leonese can be seen in Spanish-language documents from the 15th and 16th centuries written, translated or copied by Leonese authors.

The first clue of Leonese was the Nodicia de Kesos, a text found near León dating to the 10th century written in Vulgar Latin (or "Pre-Leonese Romance" or just "Romance"), which, although isn't considered to be Leonese yet, it already shows features that would later characterize Asturleonese. Meanwhile, in 1155, Fueru d'Aviles was written, being the oldest text in the Asturian vernacular. The majority of Old Leonese texts from the 13th century are in the book Étude sur l'ancien dialecte léonais d'après des chartes du XIIIe siècle by Erik Staaff in 1907. A notable text is the translation of liber iudiciorum, the Fuero juzgo or Fueru xulgu.

== Sample text ==
Extract from a letter in Old Leonese, dated to 1294.

[...] Connoscida cosa sea a quantos esta carta viren commo yo María Pérez, muller de Garçía Maquila de Felgueres, sana e empaz, en todo mio seso e en toda mia memoria estando, nen per miedo nen per forçia, nen per toruado seso, claramentre e de bona veluntat fago carta de donaçión e de bienfecho a uos María Garçía, mia criada, muller de Fernán Garçía de Çefontes, cuéllovos por filla e douos todo quanto yo deuo a auer, tanbién moble commo rayz, e nomadamentre vos do quanto yo gané del dicho Garçía Maquila, mio marido, e lo que conpré de María Gonçáliz, e les enpennes que yo fizi de Roy Gonçáliz, que non quiso quitar, e quanto yo maes ey e deuo a auer uquier e per uquier que vos lla mia derechura podierdes enuenir, en Felgueres e en Caldones e en Llinares e en Peón e en otras partes, per uquier que las yo e deuo a auer, ganadas e por ganar, tanbién en moble commo rayz. Esto vos do commo de suso dicho ye todo entregamentre, con montes, fontes, prados, pascos, felgueras, molneras, deuisas e non deuisas, llantado e por llantar, arroto e por arronper, a monte e a valle, con todos sos derechos e pertenençias e con entradas e salidas e con todas suas derechuras en pura donaçión

Modern Asturian:

Conocida cosa seya a cuantos esta carta vieren como yo, María Pérez, muyer de García Maquila de Felgueres, sana y empaz, en tol mio sesu y en toa mio memoria tando, nin per mieu nin per forcia, nin per turbáu sesu, claramente y de bona voluntá faigo carta de donación y de bienfechu a vós María García, mio criada, muyer de Fernán García de Cefontes, cuéyovos por fía y dovos too cuanto yo debo tener, tamién mueble como raíz, y nomadamente vos do cuanto yo gané del dichu García Maquila, mio maríu, y lo que compré de María González, y los empeños que yo fixi de Roi González, que nun quixo quitar, y cuanto yo más debo tener uquier y per uquier que vós la mio derechura pudieres [?], en Felgueres y en Caldones y en Llinares y en Pion y en otres partes, per uquier que yo les debo tener, ganaes y por ganar, tamién como mueble como raíz. Esto vos do como de susodicho y todo íntegramente, con montes, fontes, praos, pascos, felgueres, molineres, deveses y non deveses, llantao y por llantar, arroto y por arromper, a monte y a valle, con tolos sos derechos y pertenencies y con entraes y salíes y con toles sos derechures en pura donación

Modern Mirandese:

[...] Coincida cousa seia a quantos esta carta biren cumo you María Pérez, mulhier de Garçía Maquila de Felgueres, sana e an paç, an to l miu siso i an to la mie mimória stando, nien por miedo nien por fuorça, nien por toldado siso, cralamentre i de buona buntade fago carta de donacion i de bien feito a bós María Garçía, mie criada, mulhier de Fernán Garçía de Çefontes, cuolho-bos por filha i dou-bos todo quanto you debo haber, tamien muoble cumo raíç, i nomadamentre bos dou quanto you ganei de l dito Garçía Maquila, miu marido, i l que cumprei de María Gonçáliz, i las ampeinhas que you fiç de Roy Gonçáliz, que nun quijo quitar, i quanto you más debo haber donde querga i por donde querga que bós la mie dereitura poderdes [?], an Felgueras i an Caldones e en Lhinares i an Pion i n'outras partes, por donde querga que you les debo haber, ganadas i por ganar, tamien an muoble cumo raíç. Esto bos dou cumo de [?] dito ye todo antegramente, cun muntes, fuontes, prados, pastos, faleitales, molinos, debesas i nó debesas, chantado i por chantar, arroto i por arrumper, a munte i a bal, cun to ls sous dreitos i pertenencias i cun antradas i salidas i cun to las sues dreituras an pura donacion

English:

Be it known to all who see this letter that I, María Pérez, wife of García Maquila de Felgueres, in good health and peace, in all my mind and in all my memory, neither for fear nor for obligation, nor for troubled mind, clearly and with good will I make a letter of donation and of good faith to you María García, my servant, wife of Fernán García de Cefontes, I will give you all that I should have, both movable and estate, and famously to you all that I earned from the said García Maquila, my husband, and what I bought from María González, and the pledges that I made from Roy González, which he did not want to take back, and all that I should have wherever and wherever you can my right [?], in Felgueres and in Caldones and in Llinares and in Pion and elsewhere, wherever I have them, won and to be won, both movable and inmovable. This I give you as the above and in its entirety, with mountains, springs, meadows, pastures, ferns, mills, in and out, sown and to be sown, tilled and to be tilled, mountain and valley, with all their rights and appurtenances and with ingresses and egresses and with all their rights in pure donation.
