= Mirandese people =

Romance ethnolinguistic group from Northwestern Iberia

Mirandeses (Mirandese)
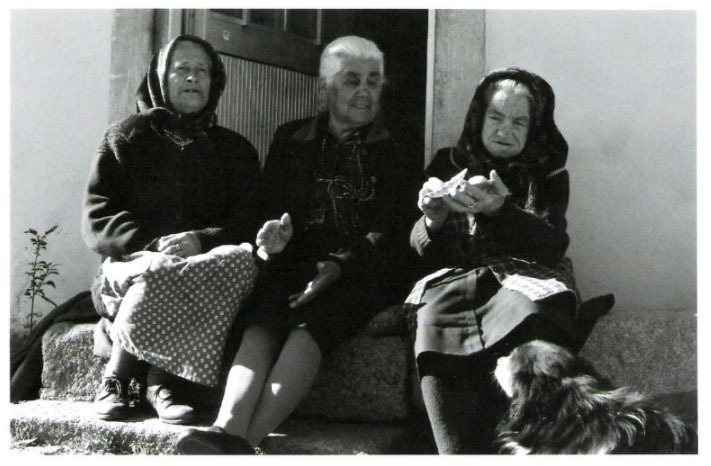
- Three Mirandese women, from Bumioso

Total population
- c. 20,000

Regions with significant populations
- Tierra de Miranda

Languages
- Mirandese, Portuguese

Religion
- Roman Catholicism

Related ethnic groups
- Leonese, Asturians, Cantabrians, Extremadurans, Portuguese and other Iberians

- People: Mirandese people (Mirandeses)
- Language: Mirandese (Mirandés)
- Country: (Land of) Miranda ((Tierra de) Miranda)

The Mirandese (Mirandese: Mirandeses, Mirandese pronunciation: [mi.ɾãˈde.z̺əs̺]) are a Romance ethnic group native to Tierra de Miranda in northeastern Portugal. Their native language, Mirandese, is an Asturleonese variety.

== History ==
The first instance of Latin presence in Iberia was with its conquering by the Romans, substituting the language of the region and the people (partially), for Latin and Romans respectively.

After the collapse of the Roman empire, Iberia was ruled by Germanic Post-Roman kingdoms, and Tierra de Miranda sat at the border between the Suebi and the Visigoths for much of the existence of both.

In the 8th century C.E., the Umayyads started raiding the coastal areas under Visigothic control, which years later led to the almost complete occupation of the Iberian peninsula by the Moors, leaving out the Kingdom of Asturias to the northwest.

The Reconquista originated the Kingdom of Leon, the only kingdom in history to have an Asturleonese language as its major language in its earlier phases, Old Leonese. But, after the union with the Kingdom of Castile and the independence of Portugal, Old Leonese, started falling in disuse, alongside other minority languages. In the specific case of the Mirandese, they were isolated from the other Asturleonese peoples by the Luso-Hispanic border in the 12th century.

After that, Portugal kept having possession over Miranda and kept influencing the Mirandese language and people until today.

== Culture ==
Mirandese culture sets the region apart from the rest of the Trás-Os-Montes region in Portugal, following suit with other Asturleonese cultures, especially its closest neighbour, Leon. Mirandese cultural aspects and declining traditions have been preserved and nourished by the Associaçon de la Lhéngua i Cultura Mirandesa (Association of Mirandese Language and Culture).

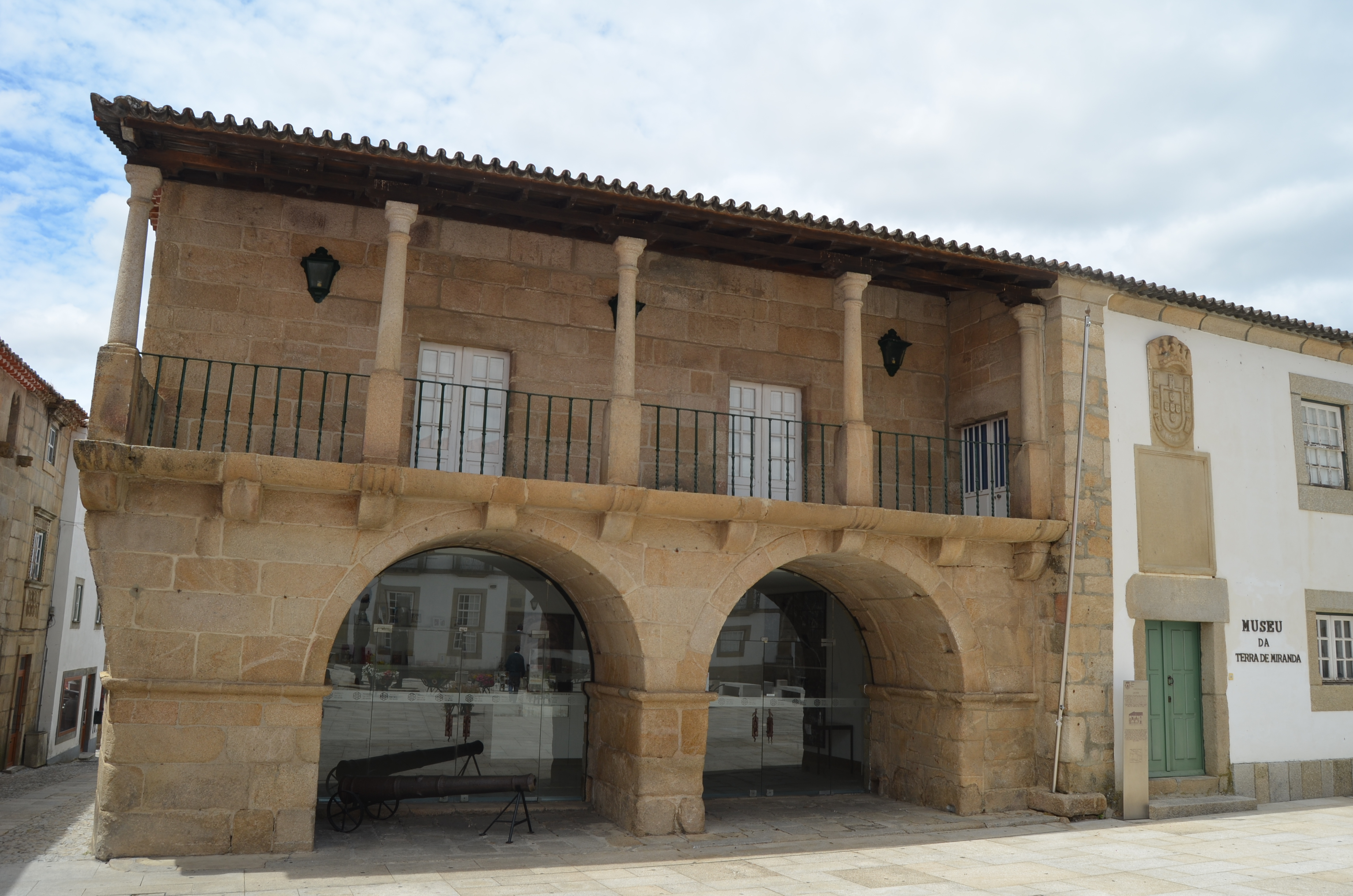
The Museum of the Tierra de Miranda, in Miranda de l Douro’s main square, Praça D. San Juan III.

=== The Dançadores ===
The Dançadores [dãs̻aˈðoɾəs̺] or Beiladores, ‘Dancers’ (commonly known as Pauliteiros by the Portuguese, from the word pau, meaning stick, possibly derived from the less common mirandese denomination Paloteiros), are a group of traditional Mirandese dancers that do their choreographies with a type of stick, also often involving acrobatics and castanets. The Leonese also have a variety of dances done with sticks, known as danzas de paloteo, or simply danzas de palo in regions nearer Miranda such as Aliste, being more similar to the mirandese terminology. Yet, unlike the Mirandese dançadores, their Leonese counterparts have greatly lost presence in Leon, while remaining very popular in Miranda.

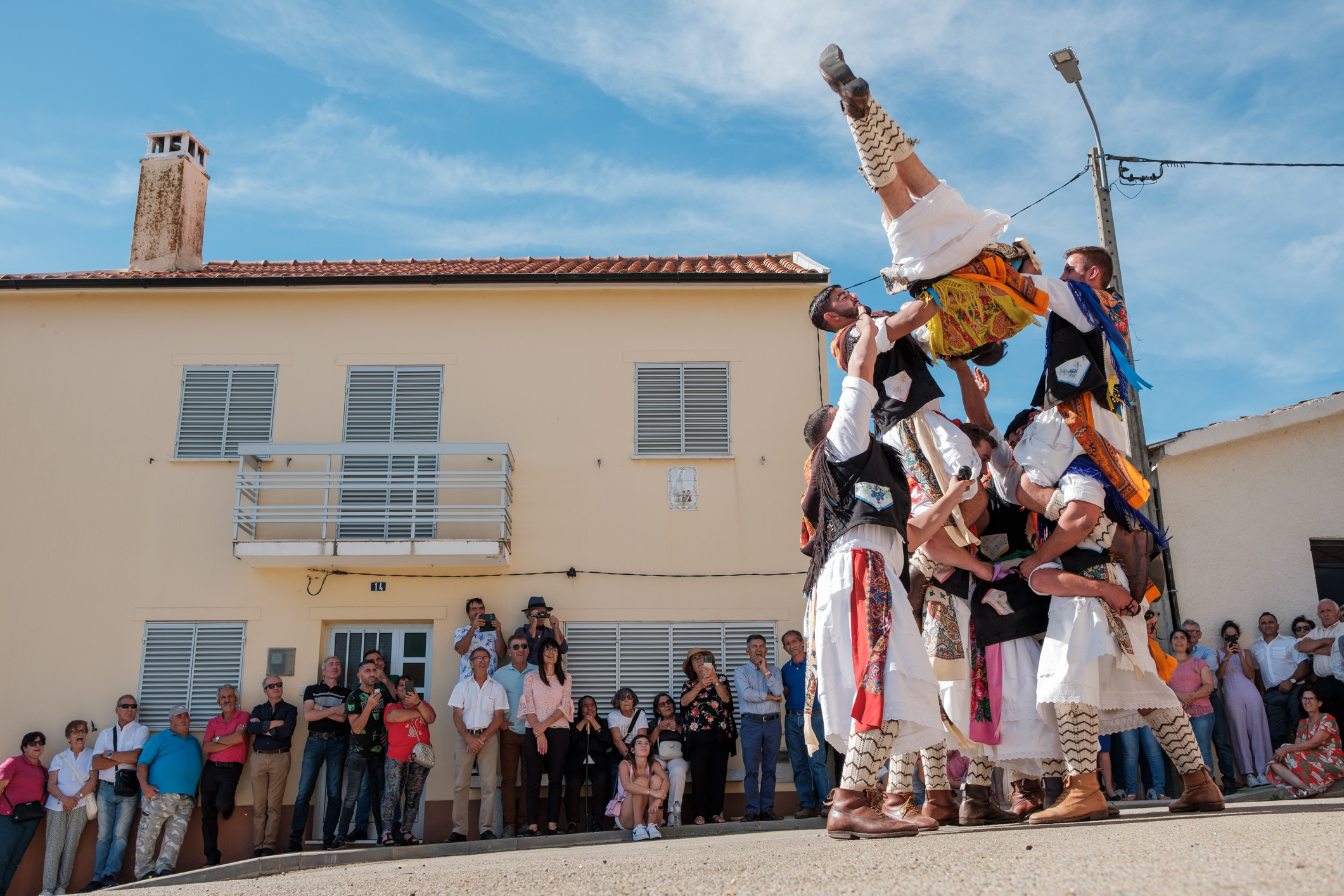
The Dançadores of Palaçuolo

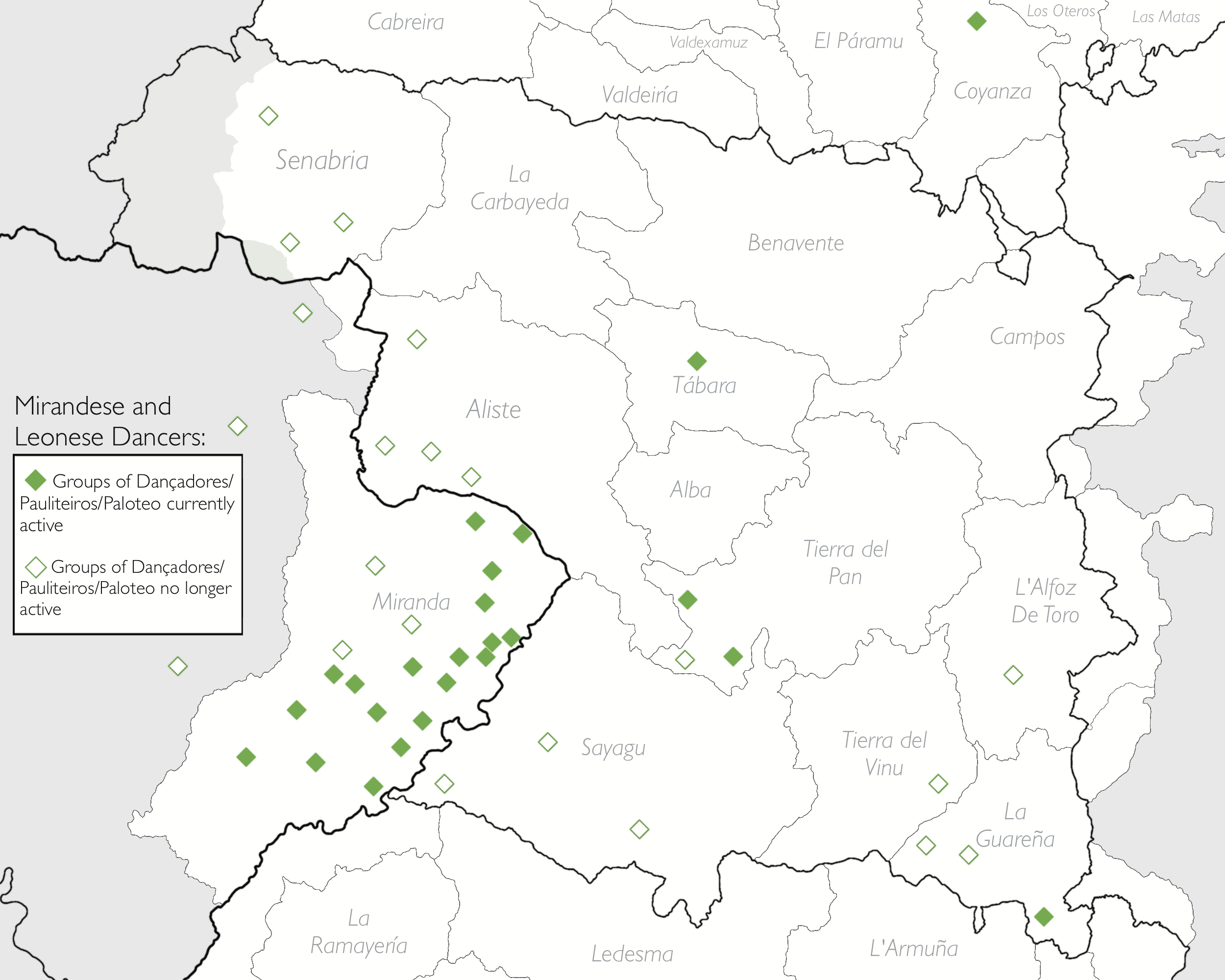
A map illustrating the current distribution of the Mirandese and Leonese Dancers

=== Mirandese Bagpipe ===
The Mirandese bagpipe, 'Gaita Mirandesa', is a bagpipe unique to Tierra de Miranda, sister to the Leonese and Asturian bagpipes, especially the Senabrese Gaita. Despite being called “Gaita Transmontana” by outsiders, recalling to the Trás-os-Montes region in Portugal, that includes Miranda, this terminology is inaccurate.

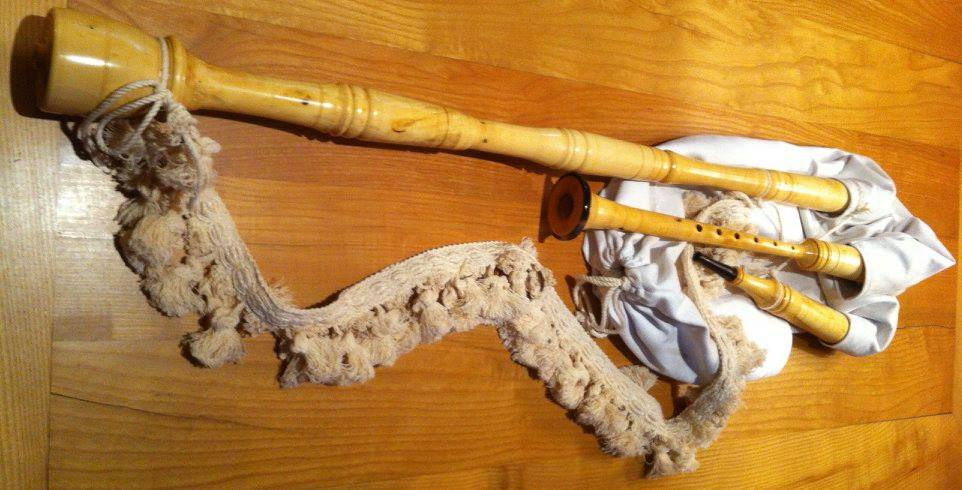
A classic Mirandese bagpipe

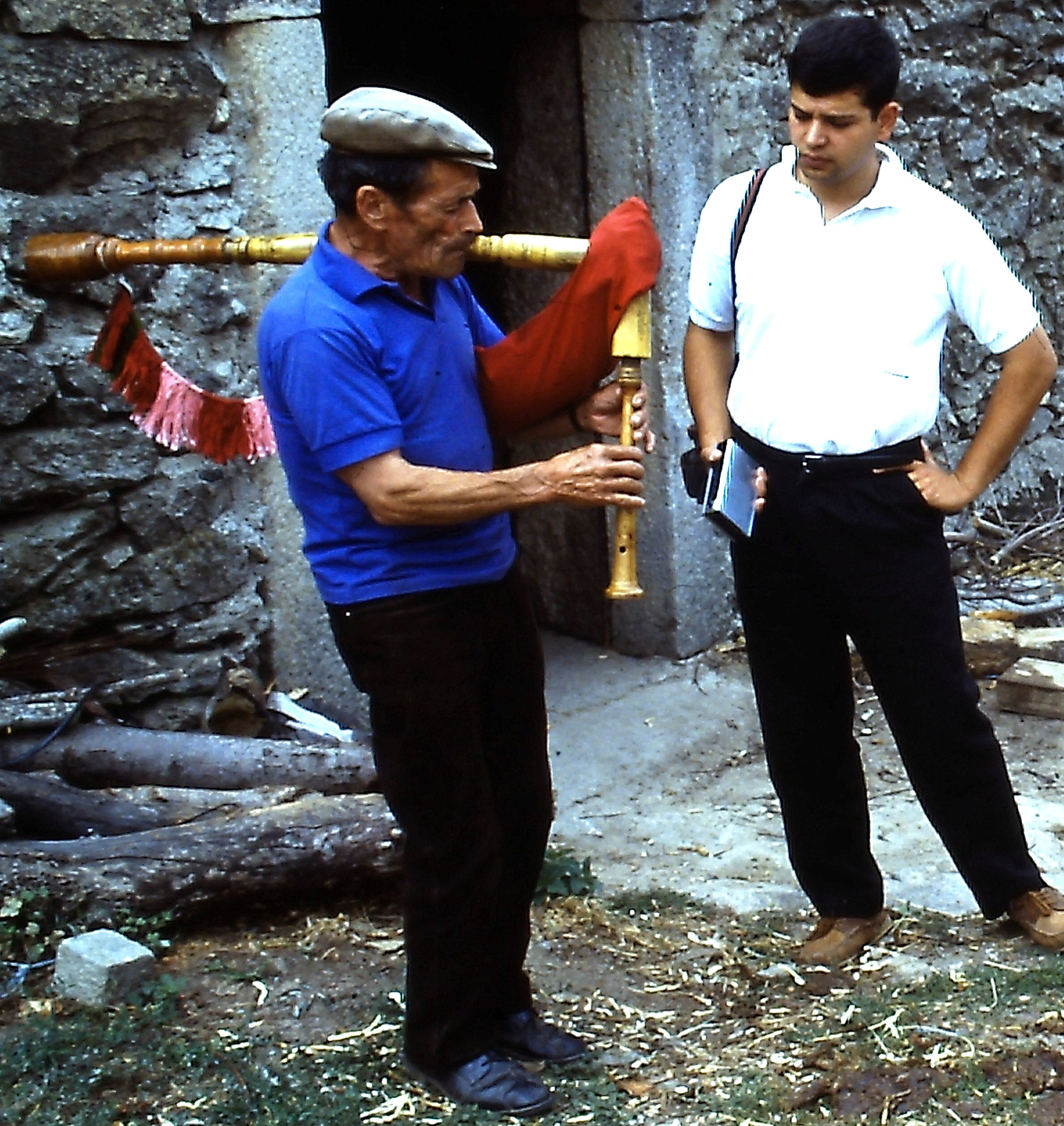
Manuel Francisco Aires, "tiu Pascoal", former popular Mirandese gueiteiro from the 20th century

=== Pendones ===
The Pendones [pə̃ˈdonəs̺] are a medieval Leonese tradition, recalling to the kingdom of Leon, that is today only practiced in Miranda and the modern region of Leon. There are various styles and shapes for Pendones, that usually vary from settlement to settlement, but most of them are red and green, with many including white or blue. They’re similar to flags, being hung on a pole and flown to the force of the wind, but bigger than the average flag. They’re carried by people that usually walk together on a march, carrying the Pendones by the pole. They are usually used on said marches during the time of April in both Miranda and Leon.

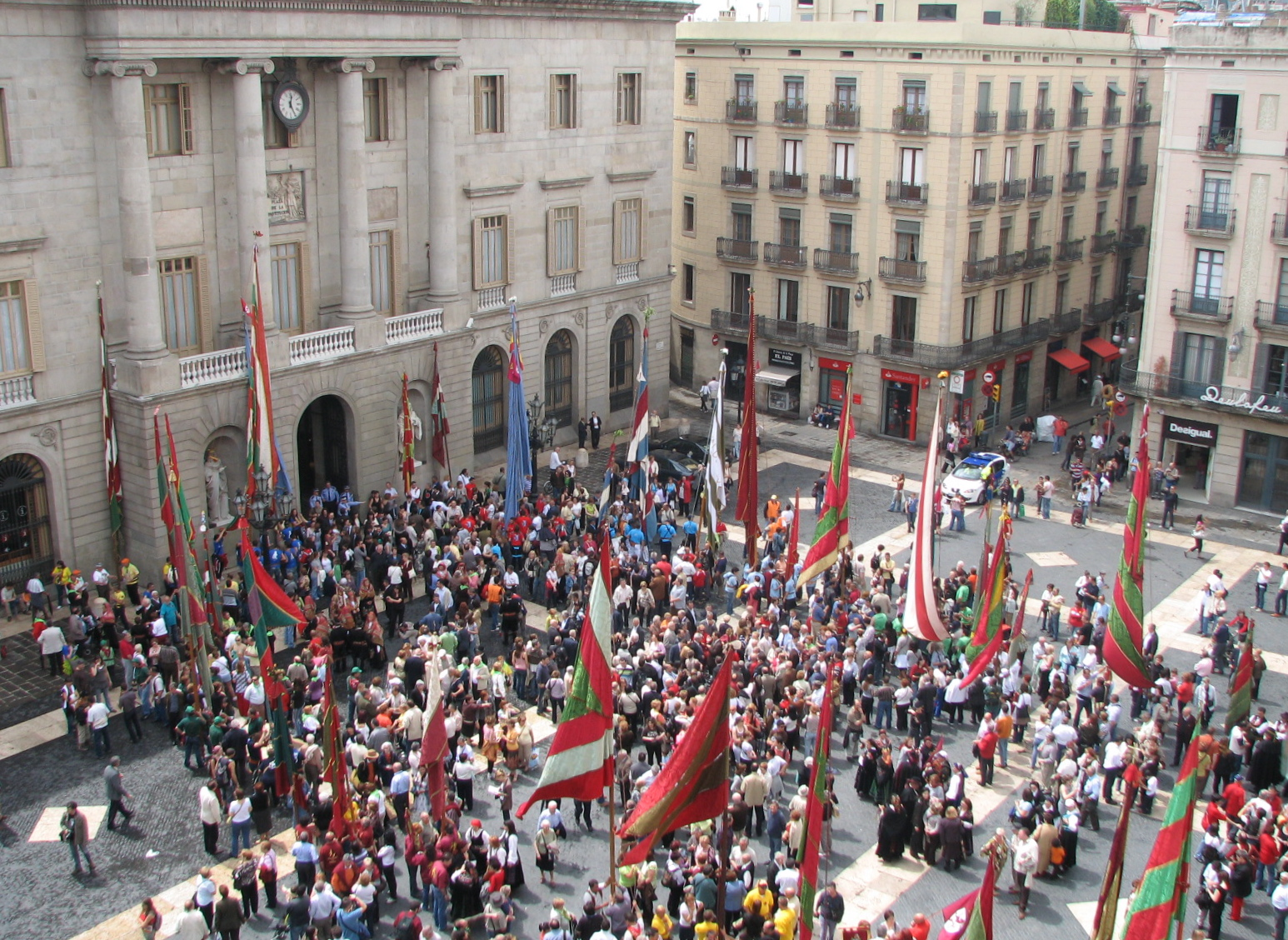
Leonese Pendones, near identical to the ones used in Miranda

=== Capa d’Honras ===
The Capa d’Honras [ˈkapa ˈdõras̺], ‘Cloak of Honours’, is a cloak traditionally used by shepherds in colder times of year, but has since evolved to be used in formal occasions in Tierra de Miranda, traditional holidays, religious celebrations and meetings with people of high status. Traditionally made from pardo (a coarse woolen cloth) and historically produced through a local, largely self-sufficient process. In the past, clients often supplied their own wool, reflecting a rural agro-pastoral economy, while tailors were hired on a daily basis to assemble the garment. Production was labour-intensive, sometimes taking many days, and allowed for personalisation through decorative patterns. Although once widespread across Miranda, Aliste, Tábara and Alba, the craft has declined due to changing lifestyles, with only a few artisans continuing to manufacture them, in only three Mirandese settlements, mainly the more ornate ceremonial versions today. Even if it is only currently produced in the east of Miranda, it is still commonly used for ceremonial purposes in all the aforementioned regions.

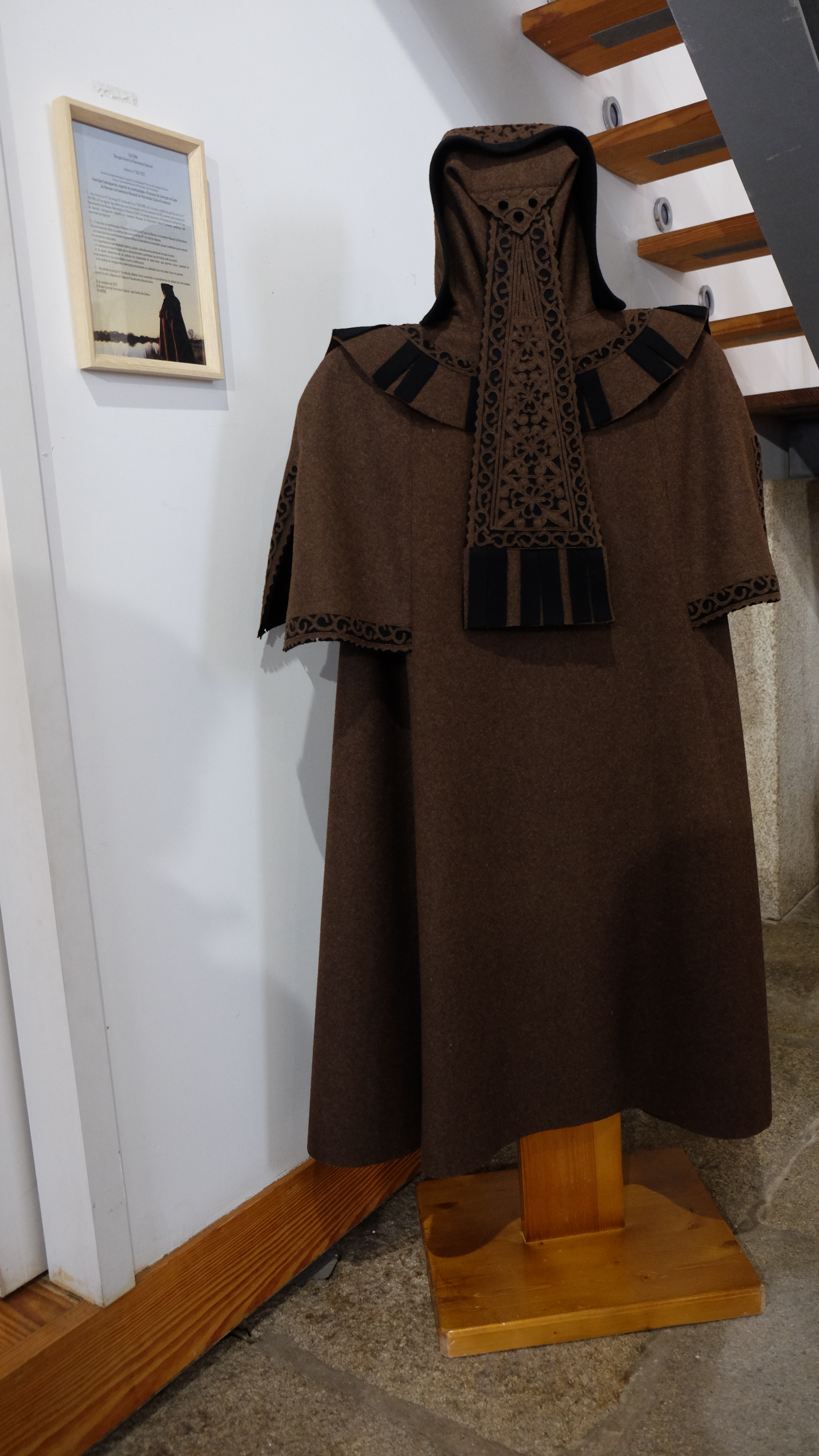
A Capa d'Honras, in the Museum of Tierra de Miranda

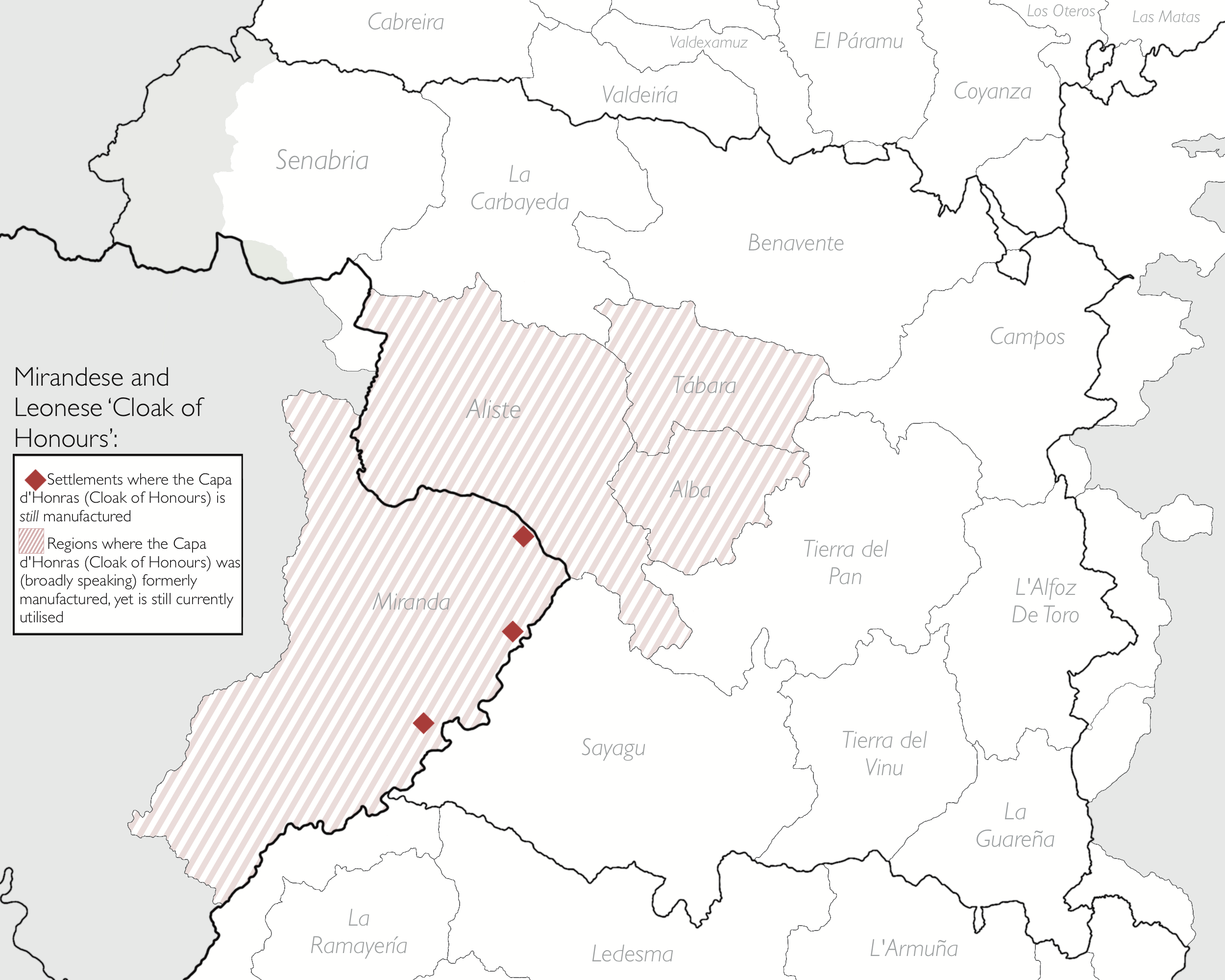
The current and former distribution of Mirandese and Leonese Capa d’Honras

=== Winter solstice traditions ===
The winter solstice, Solstício d'Ambierno [s̺oɫˈs̺ti.s̻i.ʊ dãˈbjeɾ.nʊ] or Solstício d’Eimbierno [s̺oɫˈs̺ti.s̻i.ʊ də̃j̃ˈbjeɾ.nʊ], is marked by a series of symbolically rich festivities that blend pre-Christian ritual with Christian liturgy. During that time, masked figures take to the streets, accompanied by music, dance and crowds offering food and collecting donations for the communal New-Year's Eve celebrations. Their costumes often include grotesque or zoomorphic masks (wood, metal, cork, leather or cardboard) that evoke primal themes of death and renewal. The rituals serve not only to mark the sun’s rebirth but also to symbolically invert normal social order, as masked figures enact chaos before restoring communal harmony through dance, procession and a bonfire. As testimony to their cultural importance, the municipality of Miranda de l Douro is in the process of submitting these winter-solstice mask-celebrations for inclusion in Portugal’s National Register of Intangible Cultural Heritage. These traditions, in their own iteration, are also practiced in Leon.

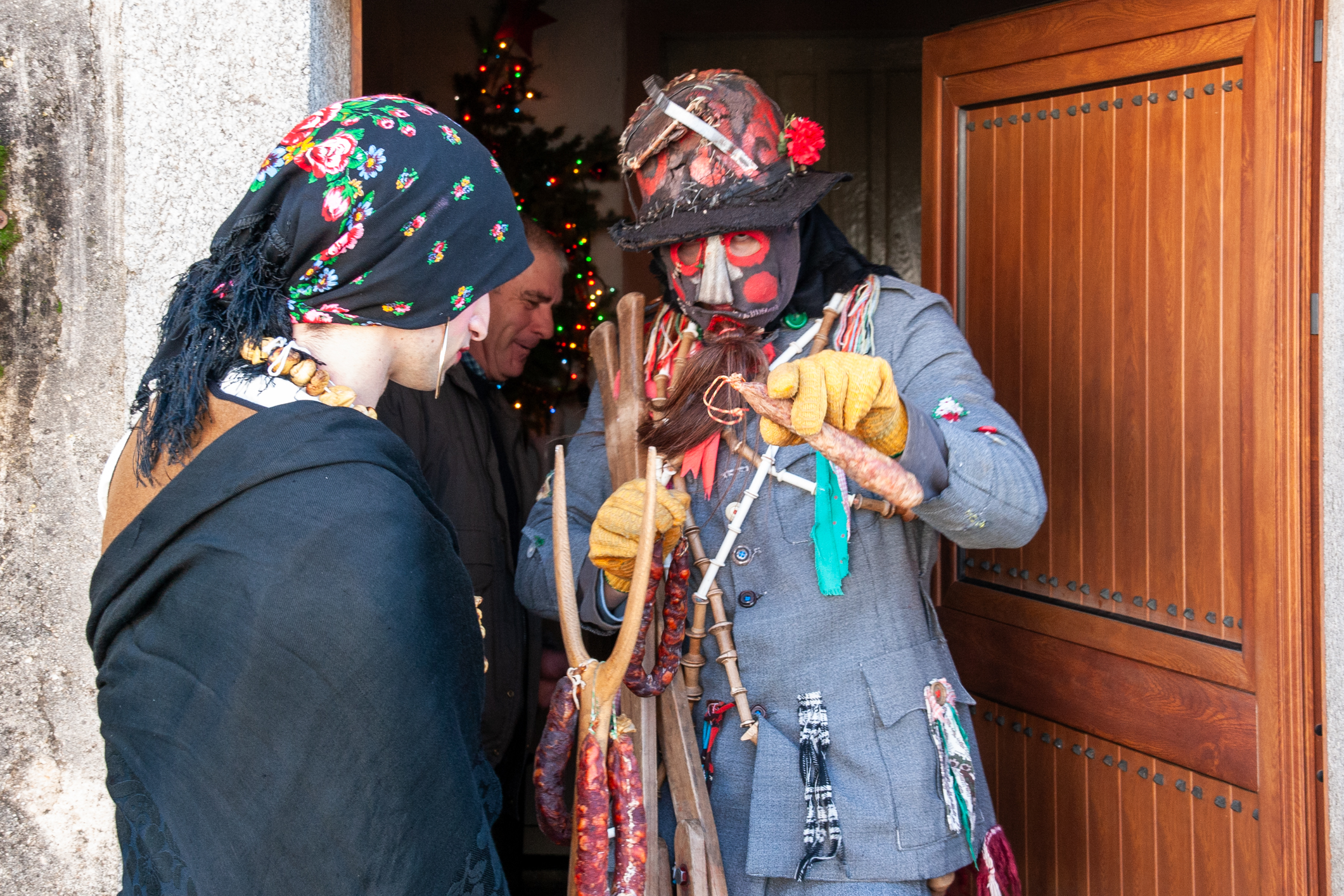
The Carocho and Bielha, two traditional mirandese Solstice characters

=== Mirandese Theatre ===
Mirandese theatre is a traditional kind of theatre performed all throughout Miranda. Displaying mostly comedic and satirical scenarios reflecting the traditional lifestyle in the region. It often depicts character archetypes like the “fool” or the “woman”, presenting a mixture of the usage of Mirandese and Portuguese, depending on the formality of the situation being depicted. Each piece is designated by quelóquio [kəˈlo.ki.ʊ]. In their own iteration, similar versions of this type of theatre are also practiced in Leon.

A very popular character in Mirandese theatre is the “fool”, boubo [ˈbow.βʊ], who is usually a nameless male character that serves as comic relief, mostly a speaker of Mirandese in the quelóquios. He can either help or cause trouble for the objective of the other characters. The fool is notable for having more freedom in the small Mirandese theatrical stages, being allowed to turn his back to the public, unlike any other character.

Mirandese theatre is traditionally a male-only activity, hence, any woman that were to be played would be played by a man dressing and pretending to be a woman.

A modern piece of Mirandese theatre, in Mirandese, Portuguese and Castilian: “Auto de Vicente Marujo”, in the Picuote Language Fest of 2026. With the Devil and the Fool on stage.

== Gastronomy ==
Mirandese traditional gastronomy makes much use of the ingredients of the region, having a varied number of original dishes ranging from meat to vegetables to desserts. Such as:

The Bolha Doce ‘Sweet Bread Roll’, known as “Bola Doce Mirandesa” ‘Mirandese Sweet Bread Roll’ in other regions of Iberia, is a Mirandese dessert, it is cake-like, coated with sugar on top and usually with some sort of alcohol put into it, traditionally rum.

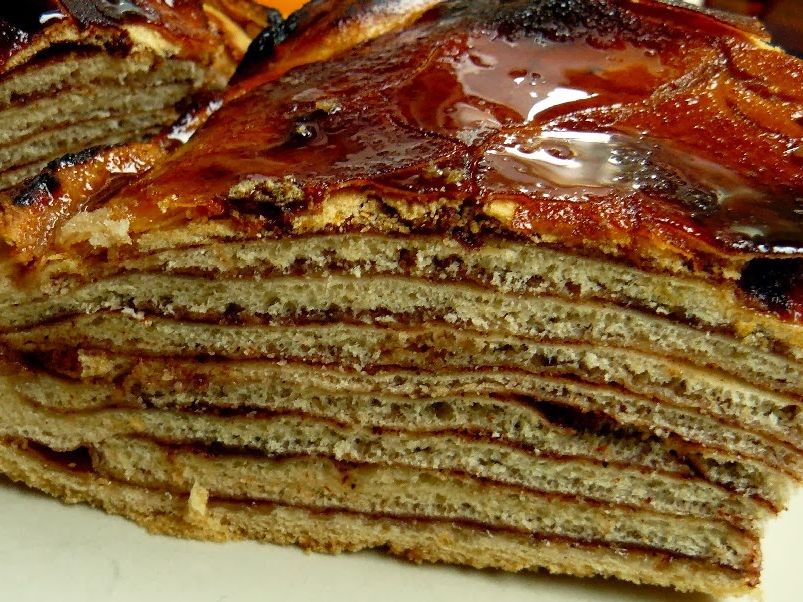
Slice of Bolha Doce

The Tabafeia ‘Garlic Sausage’ is a sort of Mirandese garlic sausage exclusive to Miranda, it’s merely named garlic sausage because the Mirandese term is different from the Portuguese term “Alheira”, so when Portuguese speakers refer to Tabafeia, they call it “Alheira Mirandesa” ‘Mirandese Garlic Sausage’.

The Puosta Mirandesa is a sort of meat dish, usually veal meat, that is eaten with other ingredients and is a full meal. Veal meat is common all throughout the Iberian Peninsula, but the mirandese recipe is infamous throughout Iberia, especially in other regions of Portugal.

The Anchidos are common in northwestern Iberia, with some unique touches in each subregion. It’s a sort of meat dish similar to the Tabafeia.

== Language ==
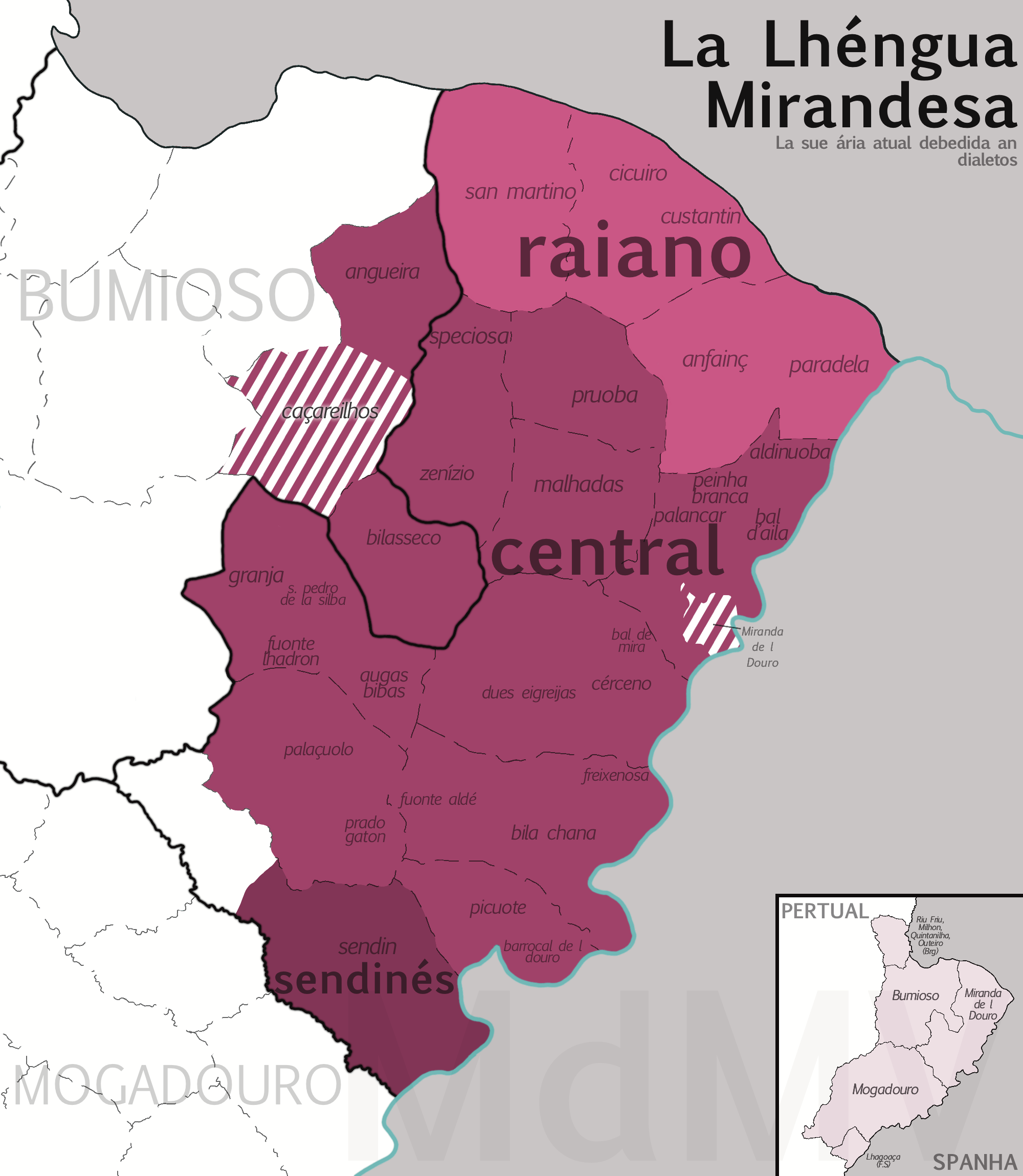
Dialects of Mirandese

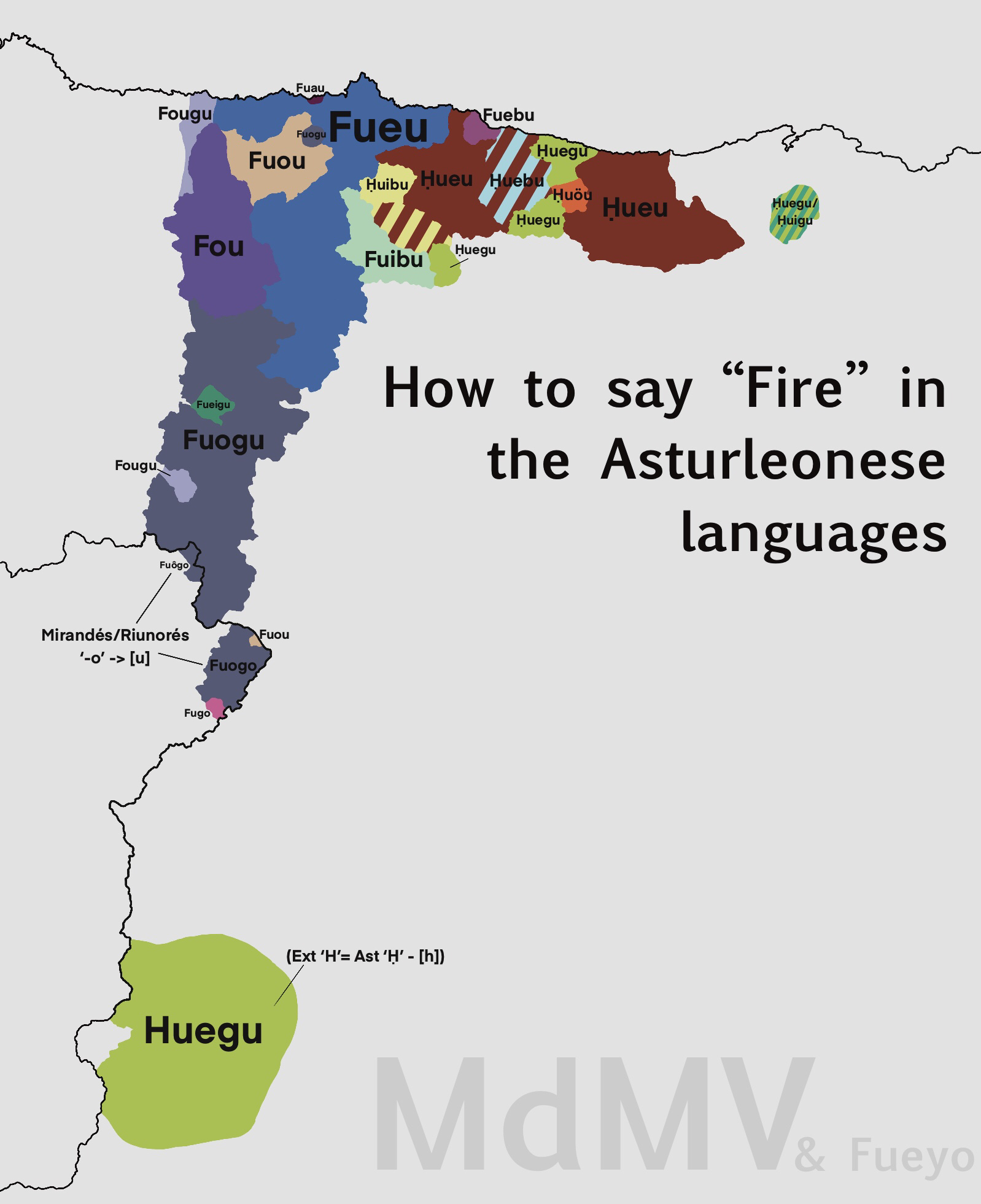
How to say ‘Fire’ in the Asturleonese varieties

The Mirandese are known for their unique language, the Mirandese language, a variety of the Asturleonese continuum, no longer spoken in all of Tierra de Miranda due to Portuguese influence, being preserved only in its eastern regions, in Miranda de l Douro and Bumioso. The language has around 3500 native speakers. It is divided in three varieties, Central, Sendinese and Raiano. Central being the standard dialect, Sendinese currently only being spoken in one village, Sendin, with various pronunciation quirks, and Raiano being spoken in 5 villages, being the most unstable variety.

== Geographic distribution ==
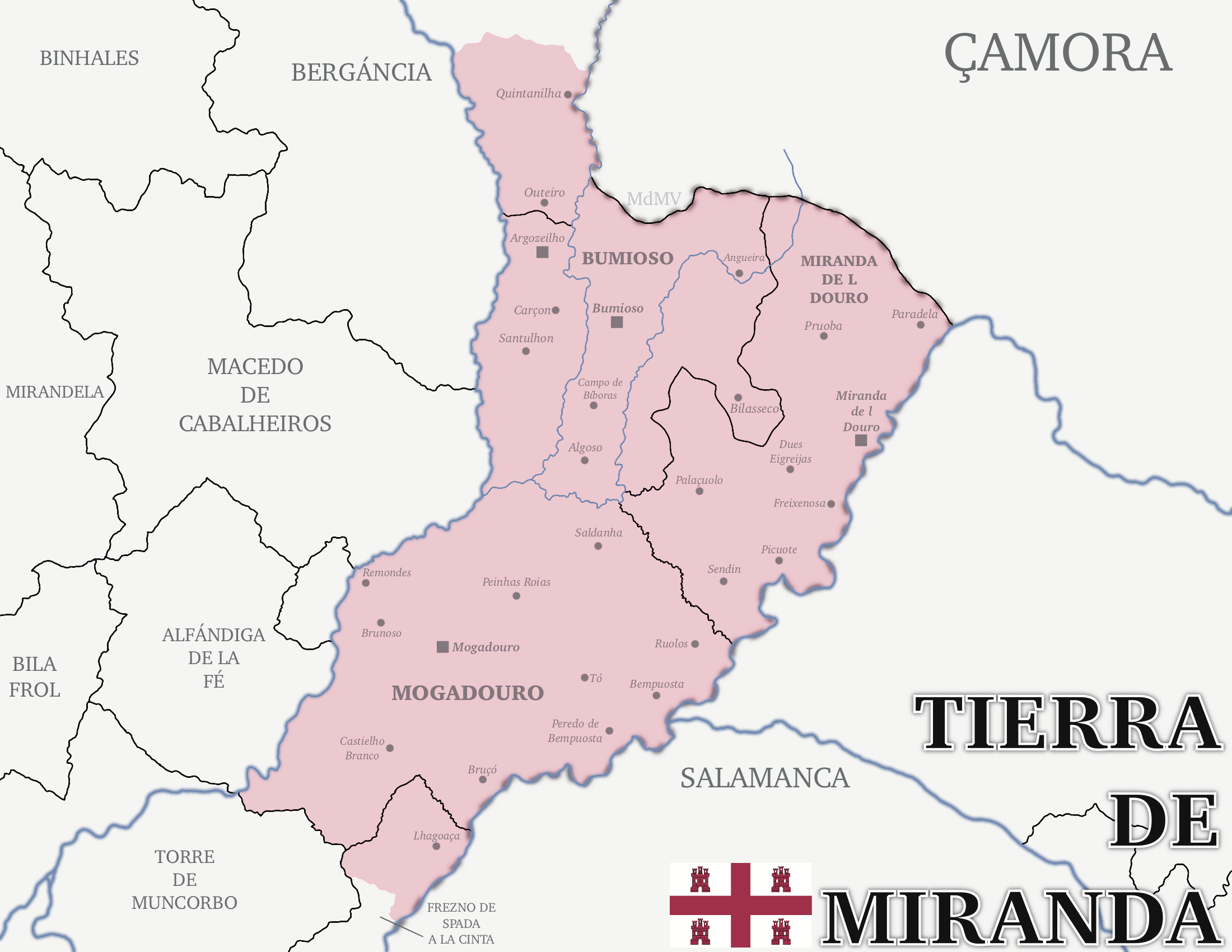
A map of Tierra de Miranda, divided into official municipalities

The Mirandese are native to the Tierra de Miranda, a geographical region in Eastern Trás-os-Montes, in Portugal. It’s composed of the municipalities of Miranda de l Douro, Bumioso, most of Mogadouro, part of Bragança (Bergáncia in Mirandese) and part of Freixo de Espada à Cinta (Frezno de Spada a la Cinta in Mirandese). Asturleonese varieties were spoken in this whole region and likely beyond, this being due to the fact that this broad region was conquered and populated by the Diocese of Astorga, an Asturleonese diocese, not the Archdiocese of Braga. Yet, throughout history, Asturleonese presence in Miranda has been reduced to Miranda de l Douro and three villages in Bumioso.

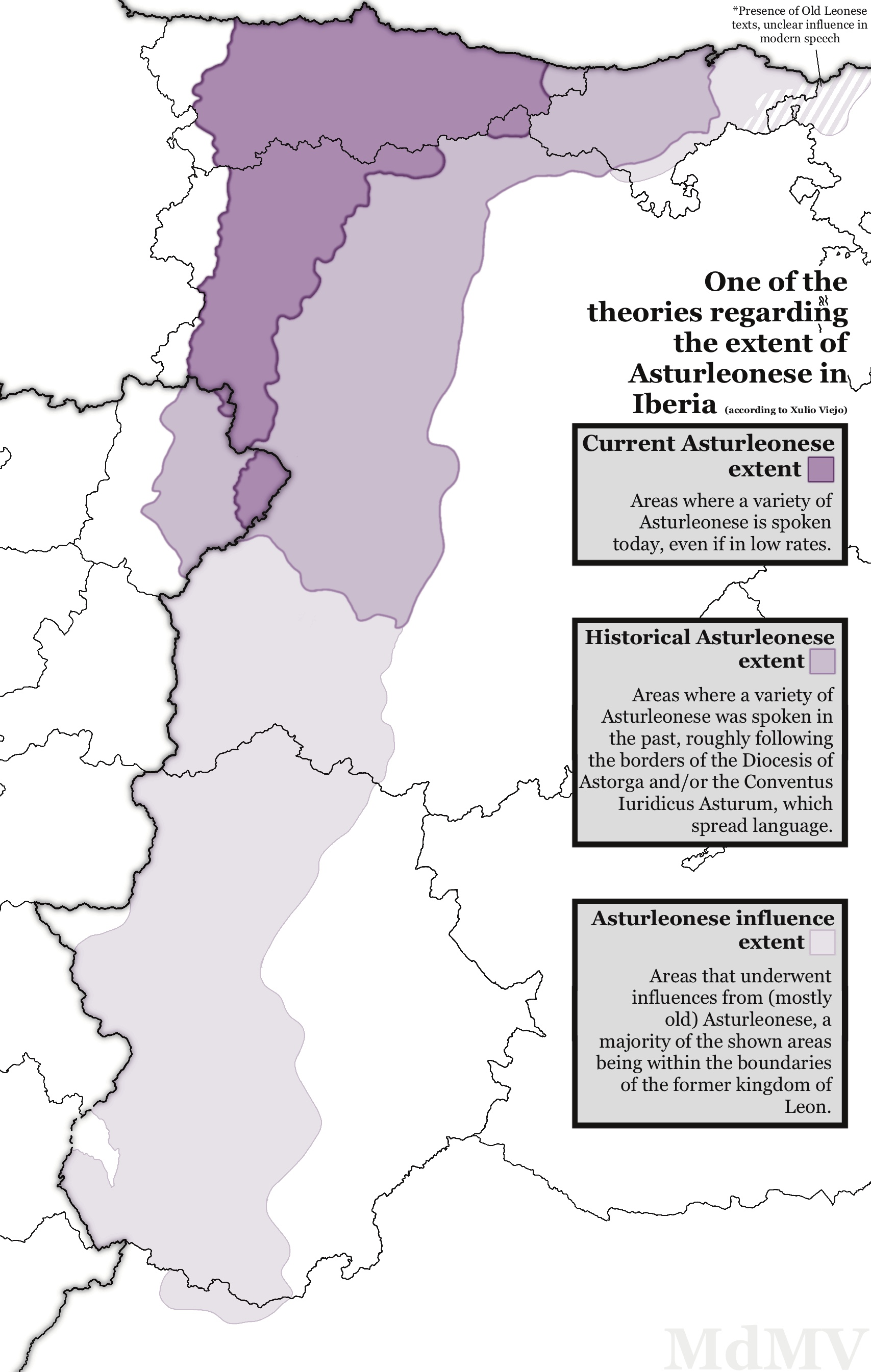
Extent of Old Leonese in medieval Iberia, displaying its extent in northeastern Portugal
