= Cedillo =

Coordinates: 39°39′N 7°30′W

- municipality
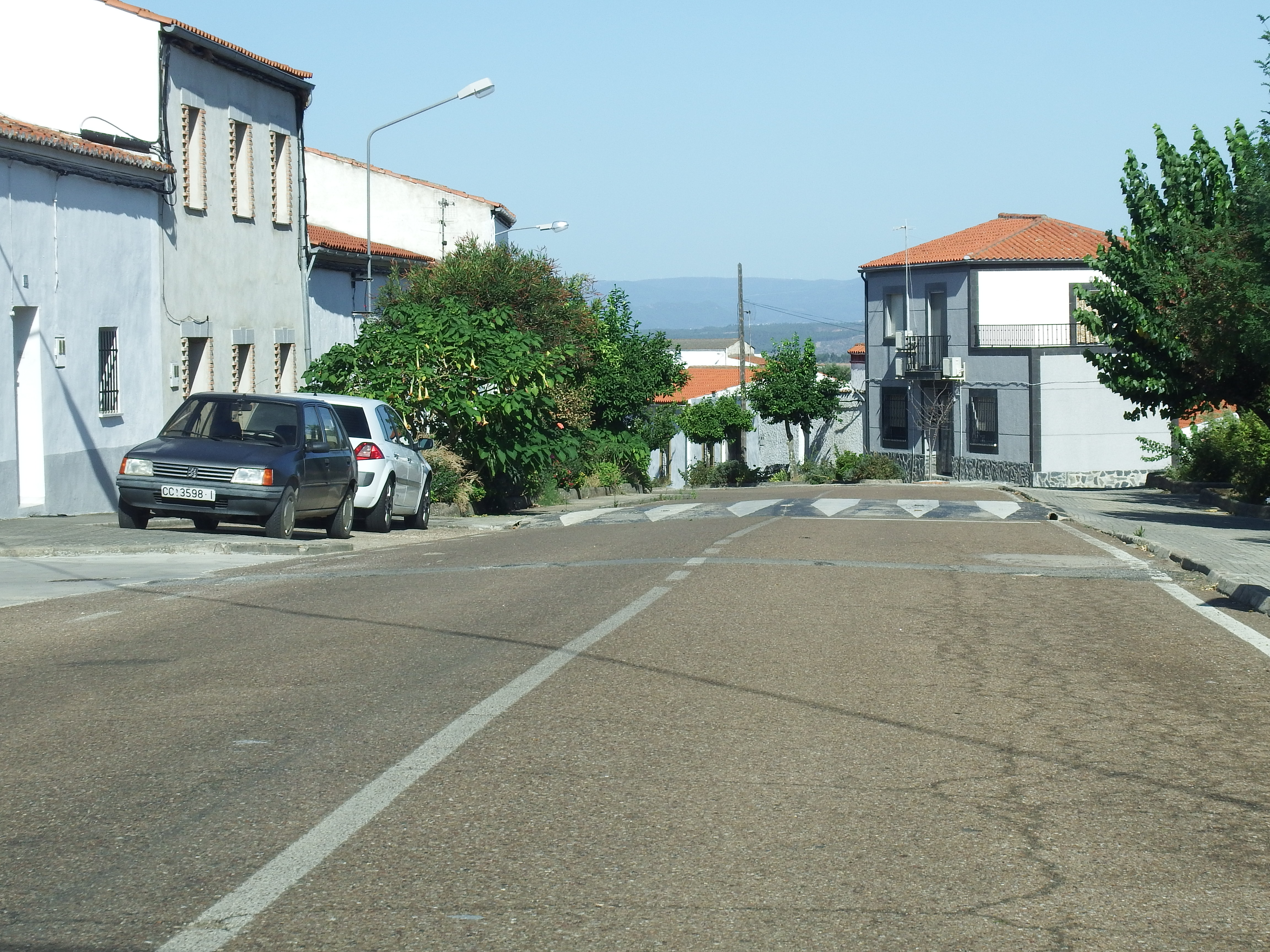

- Flag Coat of arms
- Interactive map of Cedillo
- Country: Spain
- Autonomous community: Extremadura
- Province: Cáceres
- Municipality: Cedillo

Area
  - Total: 61 km^{2} (24 sq mi)
- Elevation: 270 m (890 ft)

Population (2025-01-01)
  - Total: 453
  - Density: 7.4/km^{2} (19/sq mi)
- Time zone: UTC+1 (CET)
  - Summer (DST): UTC+2 (CEST)

Cedillo (Portuguese: Cedilho) is a town and municipality in the Spanish province of Cáceres, in the autonomous community of Extremadura. The municipality has a population of 453 (register office, 2025).

== Languages ==
The town is close to the border with Portugal. Although the official language is Spanish, the traditional local dialect is a variety of Portuguese, Cedilheiro. The Portuguese spoken in Cedillo is not standard Portuguese but is instead derived from an archaic Portuguese dialect which arrived in the 18th century. It is similar to the Alentejan dialect of Portuguese spoken in the neighbouring area of Portugal.

Portuguese is spoken in Cedillo because most of the first inhabitants were Portuguese colonists who arrived in the 18th century. In addition, in Cedillo, speaking Spanish was considered an act of pedantry and a symbol of social and economic status. The children who could attend school spoke Spanish because they learned it in school, but they still spoke Portuguese in their homes.

In the modern day, older people mostly speak Portuguese, while young people speak Spanish but understand both languages. Cedilheiro is in danger of becoming extinct under pressure from Spanish.

== Economy ==
The local workforce is primarily employed in agriculture and livestock farming. Some residents also engage in temporary work for the municipal government, which benefits from substantial tax revenues generated by the Tagus reservoir and its hydroelectric power station, constructed in the 1960s, as well as from photovoltaic facilities established in 2023.

== See also ==
- List of municipalities in Cáceres
