= Cantabrian people =

Cantabrians Cántabros

Total population
- 593,121 (Cantabria 2011)

Regions with significant populations
- In Spain: Cantabria; Madrid, Biscay, Asturias, Barcelona. Diaspora
- Mexico: 8,131
- Argentina: 3,384
- France: 2,384
- Cuba: 1,899
- Venezuela: 1,490
- Germany: 1,283
- United States: 1,190
- Other countries: 3,099

Languages
- Spanish, Cantabrian

Religion
- Roman Catholicism

Related ethnic groups
- other Spaniards (Asturians, Galicians, Leonese, Castilians), Mirandese

The Cantabrians (Cantabrian and Spanish: cántabros) are the people who inhabit the autonomous community of Cantabria, in northern Spain. They are sometimes referred to as montañeses (meaning Highlanders). The traditional dialects in this region, known as Cantabru or Montañés, are related to the Astur-Leonese languages.

== See also ==
- Cantabri
- Cantabria
- Cantabrian language
- Duchy of Cantabria
- Kingdom of Asturias
- Crown of Castile
- Nationalities of Spain
