= Herrera de Alcántara =

Coordinates: 39°38′N 7°24′W

Herrera de Alcántara, Spain
- municipality
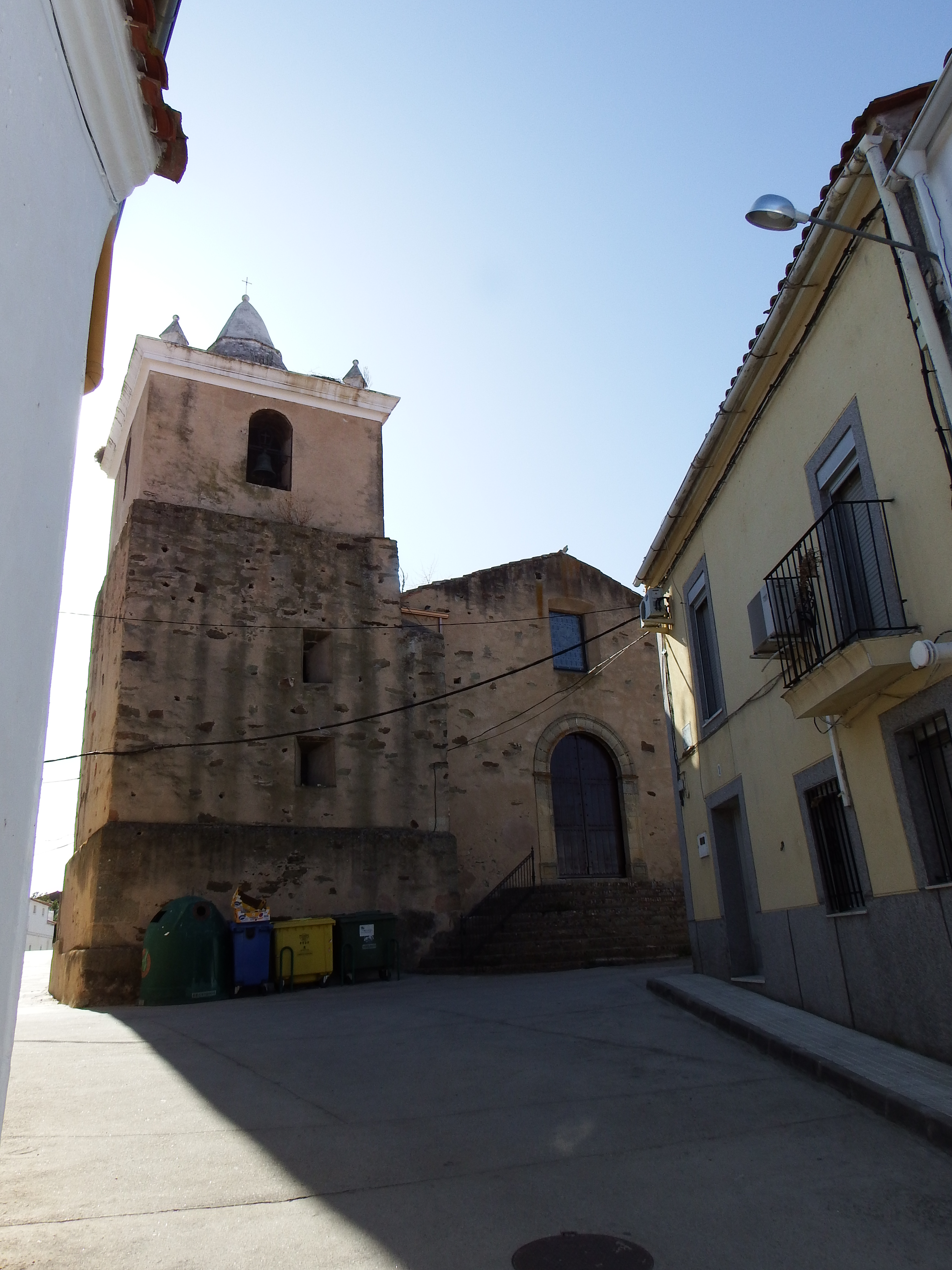

- Flag Coat of arms
- Interactive map of Herrera de Alcántara, Spain
- Country: Spain
- Autonomous community: Extremadura
- Province: Cáceres
- Municipality: Herrera de Alcántara

Area
  - Total: 121 km^{2} (47 sq mi)

Population (2025-01-01)
  - Total: 225
  - Density: 1.86/km^{2} (4.82/sq mi)
- Time zone: UTC+1 (CET)
  - Summer (DST): UTC+2 (CEST)

Herrera de Alcántara is a municipality located in the province of Cáceres, Extremadura, Spain. According to the 2006 census (INE), the municipality has a population of 293 inhabitants.

== See also ==
- List of municipalities in Cáceres
