= Music of Extremadura =

Extremadura is a region in Spain near Portugal. Its folk music can be characterized by a melancholy sound, and Portuguese influences, as well as the predominance of the zambomba drum (similar to Brazilian cuica), which is played by pulling on a rope which is inside the drum. There is also a rich repertoire of gaita (local name for a tabor pipe) music. Popular songs include: de ronda; de bodas; de quintos; de Nochebuena. Jota is also common, here played with triangles, castanets, guitars, tambourines, accordions and zambombas.

There are few ethnomusicological recordings of Extremaduran music, with the most influential and well-known being by American researcher Alan Lomax. Lomax went to Spain in 1952-3 to avoid persecution as a Communist and found some hostility from Spanish researchers, then in a period of great political upheaval. Lomax and his assistant, Jeanette Bell, did much of their recording in secret. A research centre for Spanish folk music existed in Extremadura before the Civil War, but details of its collection appear to have been lost.

Extremadura has long been one of the poorest regions in the country. As a result, many of its people left to Latin America during the colonial era (1492-1820s), leaving a mark on Latin music.

Traditional Extremaduran dances include:

- El baile de la pata
- El perantón
- El pindongo
- El son brincao
- El son llano
- La Zajarrona

== Discography ==
- "The Spanish Recordings: Extremadura" (Various artists) (collected by Alam Lomax) (Rounder, 2002)
