= Leonese people =

Leoneses
Llioneses (Leonese) Leoneses (Spanish)

Regions with significant populations

Languages
- Majority: Spanish; Minority: Leonese • Galician

Religion
- Roman Catholicism

Related ethnic groups
- other Spaniards (Asturians, Cantabrians, Vaqueiros de alzada, Extremadurans, Galicians, Castilians), Mirandese

The Leonese (Leonese: Llioneses; Spanish: Leoneses) are a subgroup of Spaniards, native to historical region of León in Spain.

The Leonese Kingdom was an independent kingdom in the Middle Ages until 1230 when it was joined to the Kingdom of Castile (from 1296 to 1301 the Kingdom of León was again independent); after the re-union with Castile in 1301 it remained a kingdom until 1833, but as part of a united Spain from 1479. In 1833 it was divided into three provinces. The languages of the Leonese people are Leonese, Galician and Castilian Spanish in Spain.

== Geography and demographics ==
=== Political and administrative divisions ===
The former Kingdom of León was divided into three historical regions: Asturias, León, and Extremadura, with the eastern territories into Castile. The Spanish division of 1833 recognised as Leonese the provinces of León, Salamanca, and Zamora. They are now part of Castile and León.

== Leonese language ==
The Leonese language (Llingua Llionesa in Leonese) developed from Vulgar Latin.

Leonese was the official language of the Leonese Kingdom in the Middle Ages. The first written text in Leonese was Nodicia de Kesos (959 or 974), and other old texts include Fueru de Llión, Fueru de Salamanca, Fueru Xulgu, Códice d'Alfonsu XI, Disputa d'Elena y María, and Llibru d'Alixandre

Its precarious situation as a minority language has driven Leonese to near extinction; it is considered a seriously endangered language by UNESCO.

== Leonese cuisine ==
Embutidos

- Cecina from León: from beef. In Leonese, cecina means "meat that has been salted and dried by means of air, sun or smoke". Cecina de León is made of the hind legs of beef, salted, smoked and air-dried in the province of León in Northwestern Spain, and has PGI status.
- Botillo: from pork. Traditionally made in the western Leonese regions. Botiellu, in Leonese language, is a dish of meat-stuffed pork intestine. It is a culinary specialty of El Bierzo, a county in the Spanish province of León and the region of Trás-os-Montes in Portugal where it is known as Botelo. This type of Embutido (Spanish) ou Enchido (Portuguese) is a meat product made from different pieces left over from the butchering of a pig, including the ribs, tail, and bones with a little meat left on them. These are chopped; seasoned with salt, pepper, garlic, and other spices; stuffed in the cecum of the pig; and partly cured via smoking. It can also include the pig's tongue, shoulder blade, jaw, and backbone, but may never exceed 20% of the total volume. It is normally consumed cooked and covered with a sheet. Also has a PGI status.
- Farinato

Wines

- Bierzo: is in the west of the Province of León and covers about 3,000 km^{2} (1,200 sq mi). The area consists of numerous small valleys in the mountainous part (Alto Bierzo) and of a wide, flat plain (Bajo Bierzo). The DO covers 23 municipalities.
- Tierras de León: is in the southeast of the Province of León.
- Toro: is in the east of the Province of Zamora.
- Arribes: is in the southeast of the Province of Zamora and the northwest of the Province of Salamanca. There are 750 ha of vineyards registered with the Consejo Regulador (Governing Body)

Sweets

- Mantecadas de Astorga
- Hojaldres de Astorga
- Lazos de San Guillermo
- Nicanores de Boñar

== Religion ==
The majority of Leonese are Roman Catholic.

== TLD Campaign ==
PuntuLLI Association fights for a Top Level Domain for the Leonese language and culture.

== See also ==
- Leonese language
- León (historical region)
- Kingdom of Asturias
- Kingdom of León
- Province of León
- Province of Salamanca
- Province of Zamora
