= Castilians =

People from historical Castile, Spain

Regions with significant populations
- Spain (Castile and Leon, Castile–La Mancha, Community of Madrid)

Languages
- Spanish

Religion
- Predominantly Latin Catholicism

Related ethnic groups
- Other Spaniards (Leonese, Riojans, Extremadurans, Andalusians, Valencians, Murcians); Cagots

Old and New Castile

Newest Castile

Castilians (Spanish: castellanos) are the inhabitants of the historical region of Castile in central Spain. However, the boundaries of the region are disputed.

Not all people in the regions of the medieval Kingdom of Castile or the Crown of Castile think of themselves as Castilian. For that reason, the exact limits of what is Castilian today are disputed. The western parts of Castile and León (that is, the Region of León) and Cantabria, La Rioja, the Community of Madrid and La Mancha are often also included in the definition, but that is controversial for historical reasons and for the strong sense of unique cultural identity of those regions. The Province of Albacete and Ciudad Real are also often included. As an ethnicity, Castilians are most commonly associated with the sparsely populated inner plateau of the Iberian peninsula, which is split into two by the Sistema Central mountain range in northern or 'Old Castile' and southern or 'New Castile'.

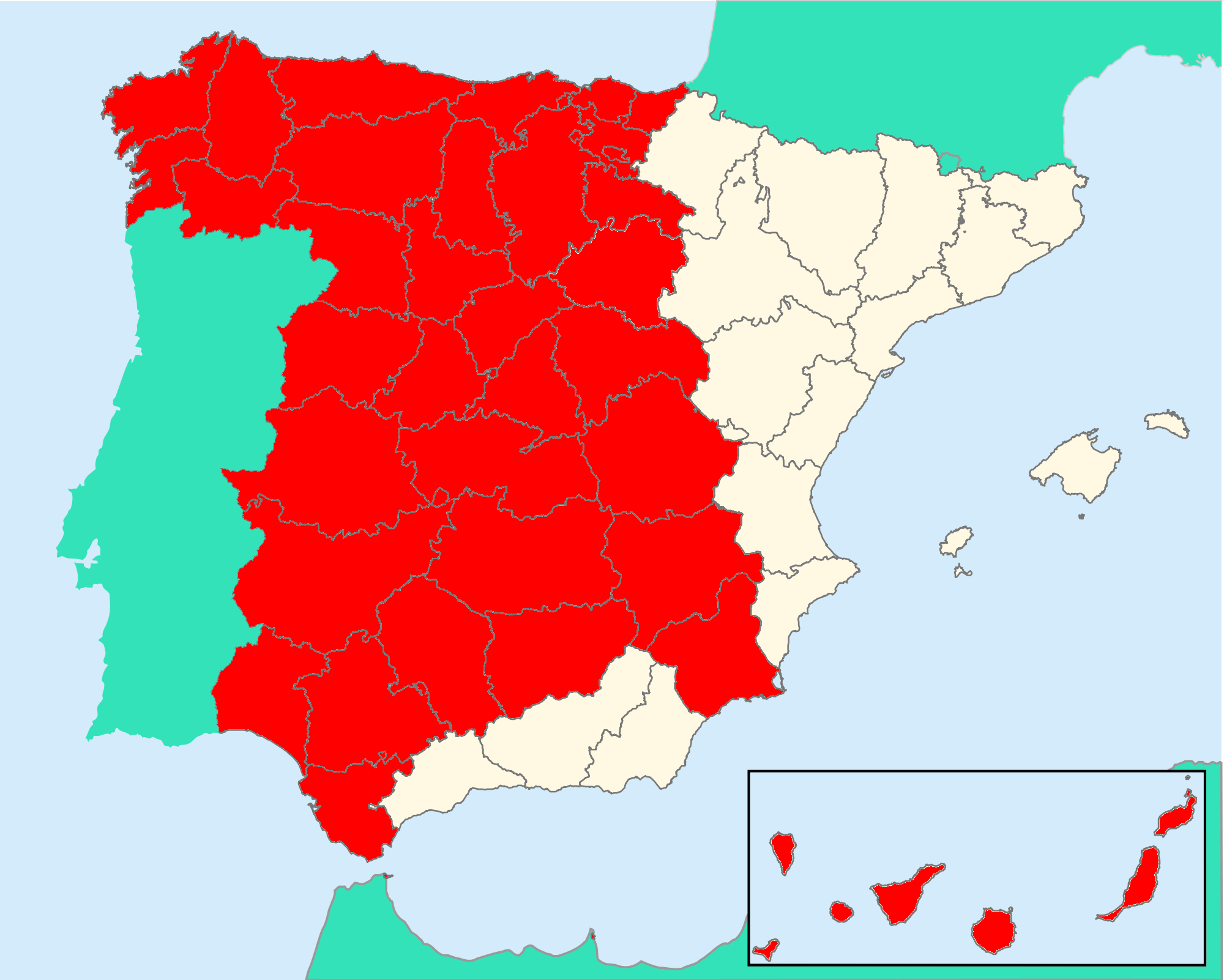
The Crown of Castile c.1480.

During the Reconquista and other conquests in the Middle Ages, the Kingdom of Castile (later Crown of Castile) spread over a large part of the Iberian Peninsula, especially towards the southern Spanish regions. Starting from the late 15th century, the Spanish colonization of the Americas led to the spread of Castilians over the New World, and they brought not only their language but also elements of their culture and traditions.

== Language ==
Castilian (castellano), that is, Spanish, is the native language of the Castilians. Its origin is traditionally ascribed to an area south of the Cordillera Cantábrica, including the upper Ebro valley, in northern Spain, around the 8th and 9th centuries; however, the first written standard was developed in the 13th century in the southern city of Toledo. It is descended from the Vulgar Latin of the Roman Empire, with Arabic influences, and perhaps Basque as well. During the Reconquista in the Middle Ages, it was brought to the south of Spain where it replaced the languages that were spoken in the former Moorish controlled zones, such as the local form of related Latin dialects now referred to as Mozarabic, and the Arabic that had been introduced by the Muslims. In this process Castilian absorbed many traits from these languages, some of which continue to be used today. Outside of Spain and a few Latin American countries, Castilian is now usually referred to as Spanish.

The language was brought to the New World by Castilian Conquistadors during the Spanish colonization of the Americas. Due to this gradual process, the Hispanophone world was created. As Castilian was the language of the Crown, it became the official language of all of Spain, used side by side with other languages in their regions for centuries. During the years of the Francoist State (1939 to 1975), there was an attempt to suppress the regional languages in favour of Castilian as the sole official language, causing a backlash against the use of Castilian in some regions after his death.

In Spanish, the word castellano (Castilian) is often used to refer to the Spanish language, alongside español (Spanish). (See Names given to the Spanish language.)

== Demographics ==
=== Religion ===
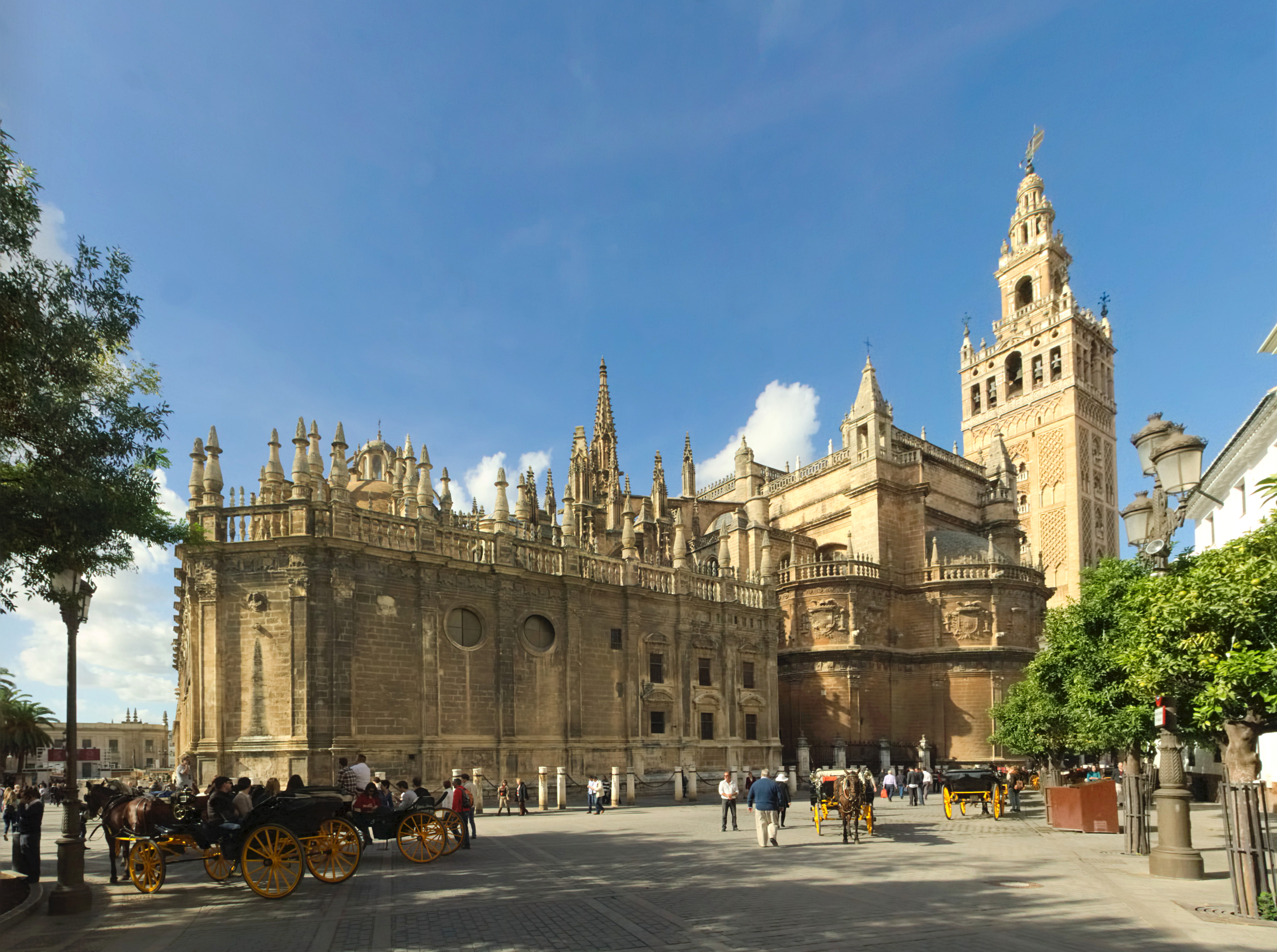
The Seville Cathedral.

Castilian identity and culture is strongly connected to Roman Catholicism. It is the religion of the overwhelming majority of Castilians as a result of the settlement of Christian populations and forced assimilation of religious minorities (particularly Judaism and Islam) prior and during the Spanish Inquisition. The presence in the region of minority religions such as Protestantism, Orthodox Christianity, Islam or Judaism are the result of recent conversions or immigration.

== See also ==
People

- Castilian-Basque aristocracy
- Spanish people
- Andalusian people
- Canarian people
- Cantabrian people
- Sephardic Jewish people

Castile

- Castilian Spanish
- Castile (historical region)
- Castile and León
- Castile-La Mancha
- Crown of Castile
- Kingdom of Castile
- Kingdom of León
