= Salvatierra =

Salvatierra may refer to:

== Places ==
Mexico

- Salvatierra, Guanajuato, a municipality in the state of Guanajuato

Spain

- Salvatierra (comarca), a subcomarca of Guijuelo in the province of Salamanca, Castile and León
- Berrocal de Salvatierra, a municipality in the province of Salamanca, Castile and León
- Fuenterroble de Salvatierra, a municipality in the province of Salamanca, Castile and León
- Salvatierra/Agurain, a municipality in the province of Álava, Basque Country
- Salvatierra de Esca, a municipality in the province of Zaragoza, Aragon
- Salvatierra de los Barros, a municipality in the province of Badajoz, Extremadura
- Salvatierra de Santiago, a municipality in the province of Cáceres, Extremadura

== People with the surname ==
- Adriana Salvatierra (born 1989), Bolivian political scientist and politician
- Agustín Salvatierra (born 1970), Chilean footballer
- Daniel Salvatierra (born 1990), Argentine footballer
- Diego Salvatierra (born 1980), Argentine footballer
- Herbert Salvatierra (born 1980), Bolivian lawyer and politician
- José Salvatierra (born 1989) Costa Rican footballer
- Juan María de Salvatierra (1648–1717), Catholic missionary
- Raul Salvatierra (born 1991), Bolivian basketball player
- Roberto Salvatierra (born 1984), Argentine footballer

== See also ==
- Salvaterra (disambiguation), the Galician and Portuguese equivalent
