= Casas de Monleón =

Village in Salamanca, Spain

Coordinates: 40°34′N 5°50′W

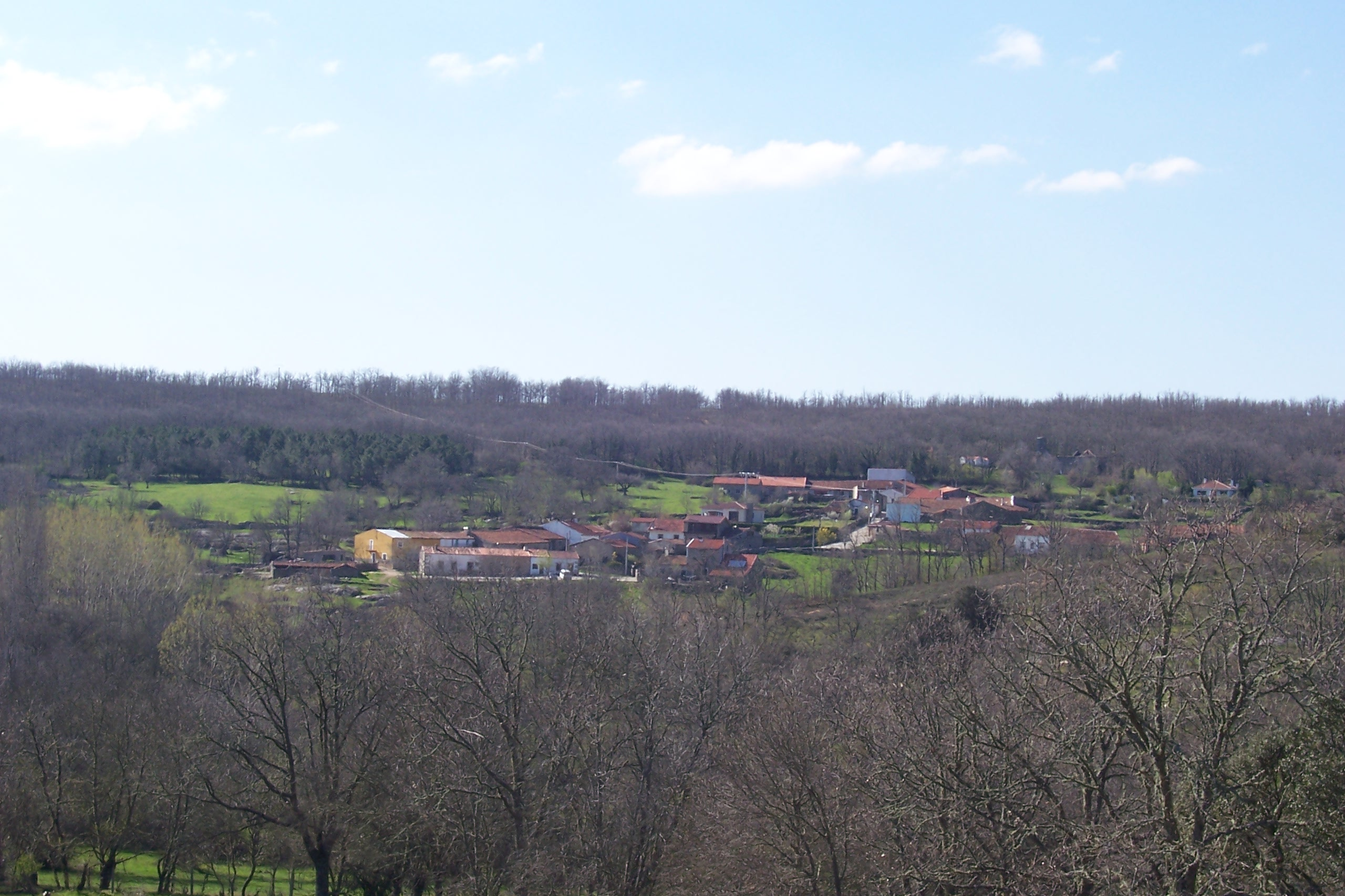
Casas de Monleón
Casas de Monleón is nestled in the foothills of the central ranges of Spain
Country	Spain
Autonomous community	Castilla y León
Province	Salamanca
Population	49
Postal code	37765
Altitude	890 m
Coordinates	40°34'N 5°50'S
Distances	48 km to Salamanca 80 km to Ciudad Rodrigo 40 km to Béjar
River	Santa María

Casas de Monleón is a small village or hamlet in the southeast corner of the province of Salamanca, Spain.

== History and Name ==
Casas de Monleón was founded several hundred years ago (c. 1200) when settlers from the north of Spain repopulated the central ranges after the Reconquista expelled the Moors. The population has waxed and waned and it may not have been inhabited continuously since that time.

At some point, Casas de Monleón (literally: houses of Monleón) is said to have been the residence of many of the servants who worked in the adjacent, more upscale town of Monleón, which boasts an enclosing wall and a tower and may have been the seat of local governance for some time.

A short walk from the village are some Celtic ruins, mainly tombs hewn out of flat rocks, which folk culture often identifies as ancestral wine presses. On the highest side of the village there is an old Roman Catholic church building that has fallen into ruins.

== Government ==
Casas de Monleón was formerly incorporated; however, as a result of the sharp decline in the population in the latter twentieth century due to the Spanish miracle which drew many rural people to the cities, it has been annexed to the nearby town of Endrinal de la Sierra. Consequently, it has no mayor, but rather a councilor that serves with two additional councilors of Endrinal and the mayor of Endrinal.

== Local Culture ==
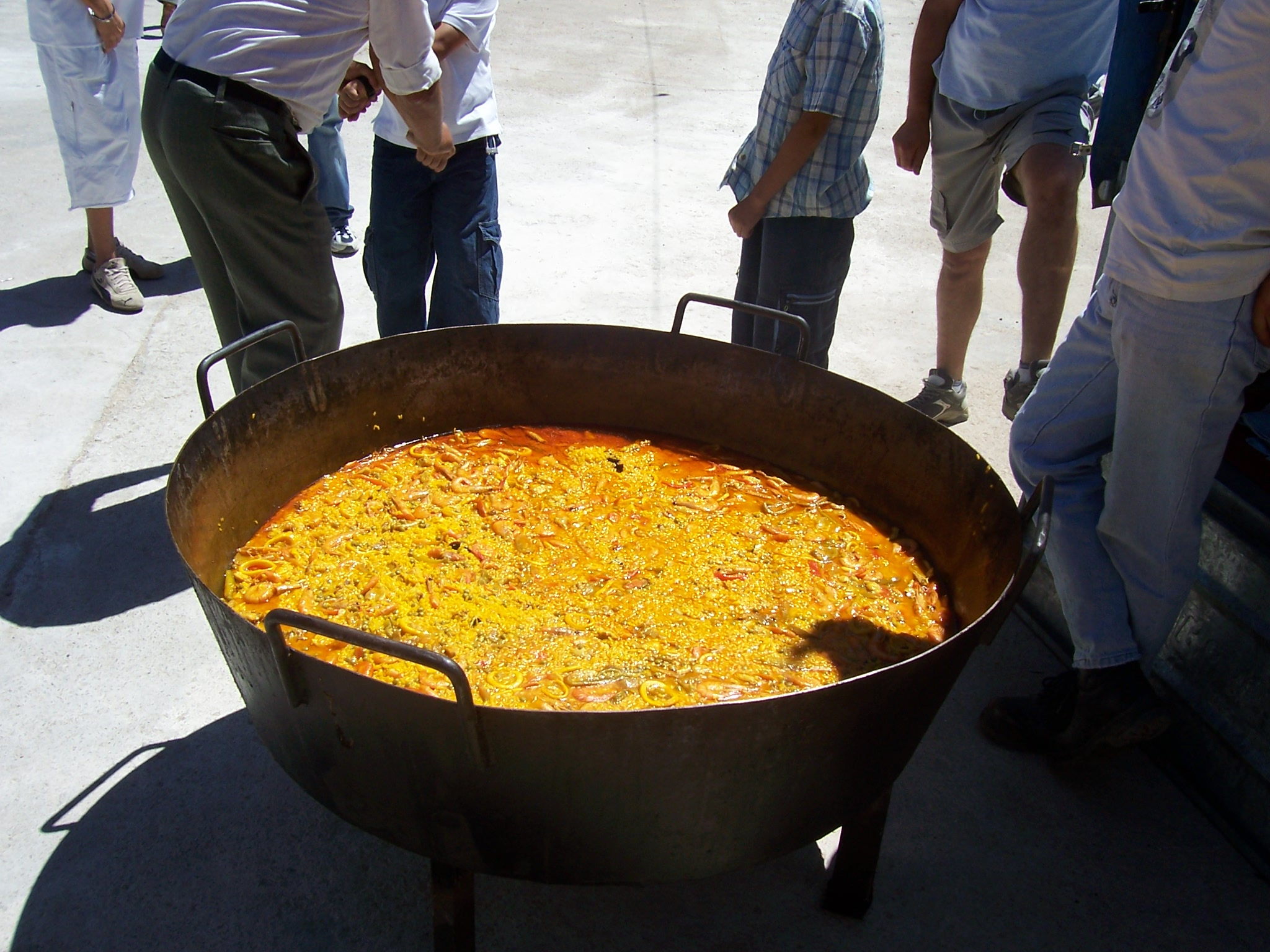
A village-sized paella

The majority of the population is composed of farmers. Locals tend their livestock and gardens, some produce of which they sell out of town, and frequently travel for other necessities and socialization. Much of the economy is supported by agricultural subsidies.

The village celebrates its patron saint in August. The extended family of residents usually comes from the cities and enjoys the concerts and dancing in the plaza at night; the children have organized games; and everyone meets together for lunch on Sunday to eat paella, also in the main plaza.

Castilian Spanish is spoken, with various local colloquialisms influenced by Portuguese, such as inserting the definite article before a possessive pronoun (e.g. la mi casa, instead of only mi casa).

== Geography ==
Casas de Monleón is in the Tagus watershed with the Santa María stream passing nearby and flowing into the Alagón River, a major tributary of the Tagus.

It is near the base of the Sierra de las Quilamas, a ridge between the Sierra de Béjar and the Sierra de Francia mountain ranges, themselves being ranges in the Sistema Central. It is situated 48 km (30 mi) south of Salamanca proper and 80 km (50 mi) east of Ciudad Rodrigo. Nearby municipalities include Endrinal, Monleón, Los Santos, Linares de Riofrío, and the major meat-processing center for jamón ibérico, Guijuelo.

== Climate and Ecology ==
Casas de Monleón has warm, balmy summers with little rain, foggy and rainy winters, and fickle springs and autumns. Annual precipitation is about 750 mm (30 in.), typical of its mountainous continental Mediterranean climate.

The vegetation in the area consists of a mix of Atlantic and Mediterranean continental species including such trees as holm oak, pyrenean oak, chestnut, black poplar, ash, and pines and shrubbery such as brooms and lavender. The fauna comprises various species of snakes, lizards, perching birds, small mammals, and an occasional wild boar.

== See also ==
- Castilla y León
- List of municipalities in Salamanca
- Mediterranean Climate
- Salamanca
- Spain
- Spanish language
