= Motilleja =

- Municipality
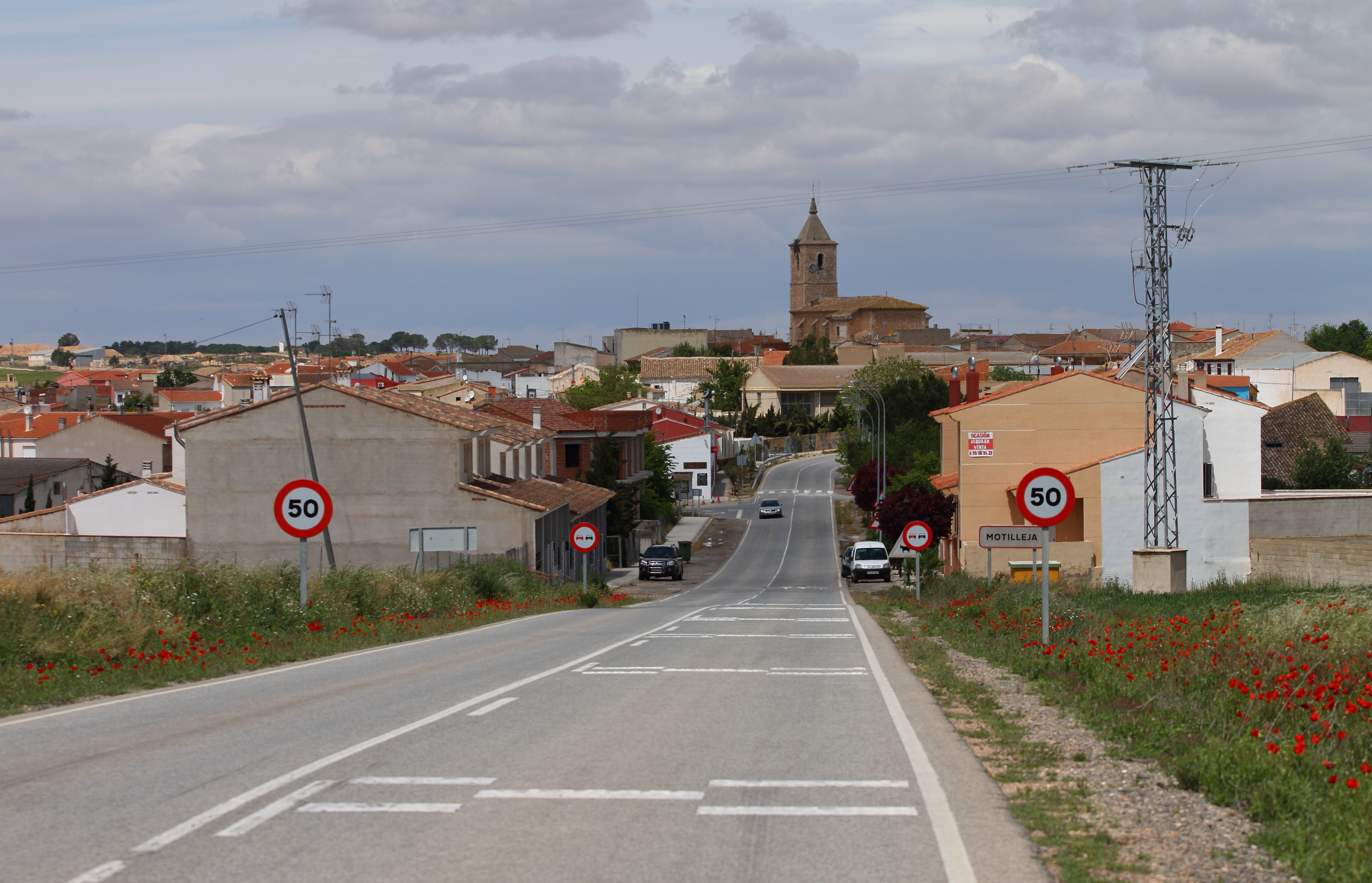
- Coat of arms

- Coat of arms
- Location of Motilleja
- Coordinates: 39°10′50″N 1°47′31″W
- Country: Spain
- Autonomous community: Castilla-La Mancha
- Province: Albacete
- Comarca: La Manchuela

Government
  - Alcalde: Antonio Francisco Armero Gómez

Area
  - Total: 23.82 km^{2} (9.20 sq mi)

Population (2025-01-01)
  - Total: 673
  - Density: 28.3/km^{2} (73.2/sq mi)
- Time zone: UTC+1 (CET)
- Postal code: 02220
- Website: Official website

Motilleja is a municipality in Albacete, Castile-La Mancha, Spain. In 2018, it had population of 548.
