= Alcazarén =

Alcazarén, Spain
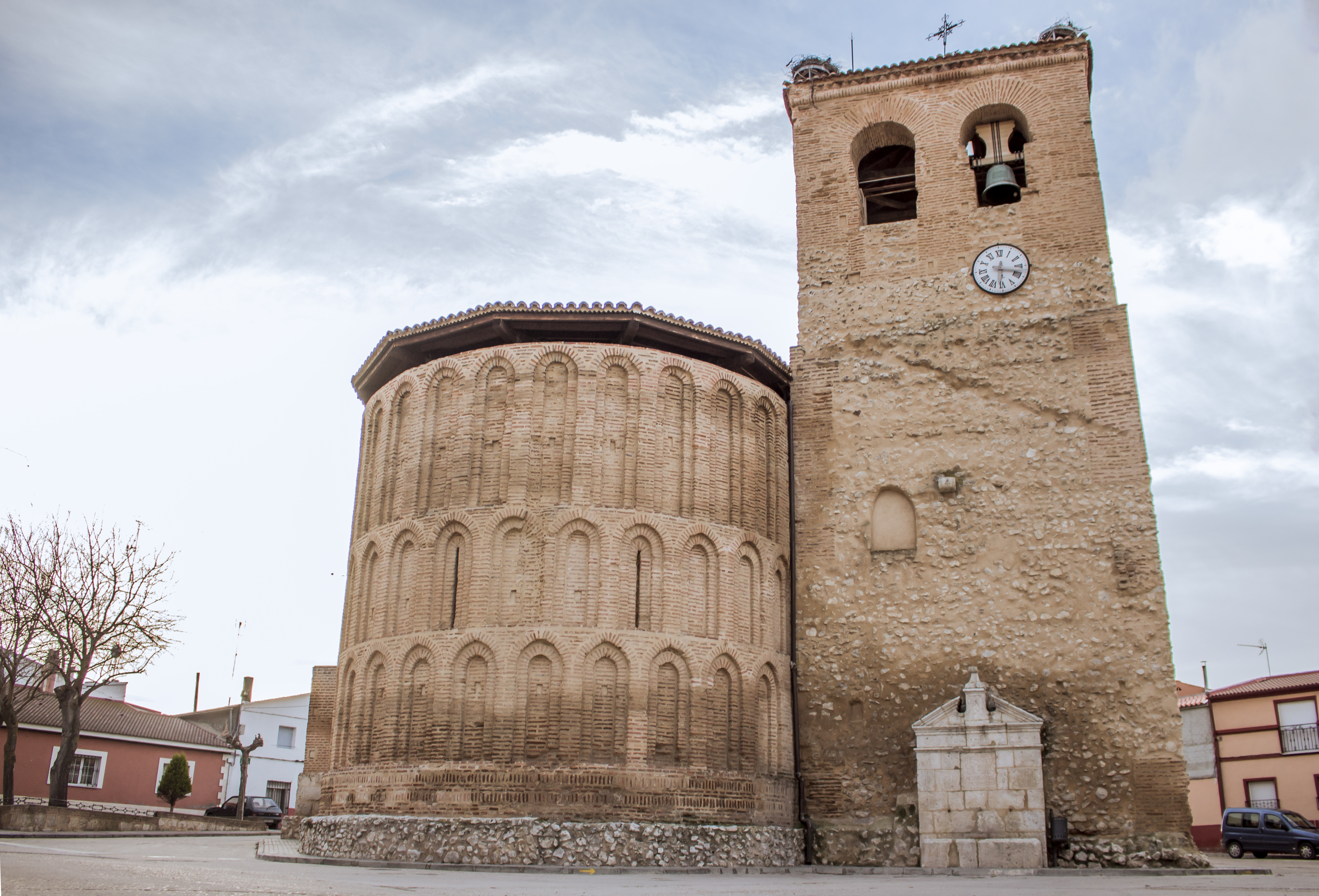
- Church of Santiago Apóstol in Alcazarén.

- Flag Coat of arms
- Interactive map of Alcazarén, Spain
- Country: Spain
- Autonomous community: Castile and León
- Province: Valladolid
- Comarca: Tierra de Pinares

Area
  - Total: 48.04 km^{2} (18.55 sq mi)
- Elevation: 731 m (2,398 ft)

Population (2025-01-01)
  - Total: 623
  - Density: 13.0/km^{2} (33.6/sq mi)
- Time zone: UTC+1 (CET)
  - Summer (DST): UTC+2 (CEST)

Alcazarén is a town and municipality in the Province of Valladolid, part of the autonomous community of Castile and León, Spain. with a population of 702 (as of 1 January 2004 census). Its name originates from the Arab "al-qasrayn" which means "the two castles". In the Tierra de Pinares region it is located 35 km South of the province's capital (41.3725° N, 4.6714° W). It occupies an area of 48 km² with a 33.51 km perimeter.

== See also ==
- List of municipalities in Valladolid
