= Herguijuela del Campo =

- Municipality
- Location in Salamanca
- Coordinates: 40°38′1″N 5°52′0″W
- Country: Spain
- Autonomous community: Castile and León
- Province: Salamanca
- Comarca: Comarca de Guijuelo
- Subcomarca: Entresierras

Government
  - Mayor: Dionisio Cañedo Martín (Citizens)

Area
  - Total: 26 km^{2} (10 sq mi)
- Elevation: 927 m (3,041 ft)

Population (2025-01-01)
  - Total: 60
  - Density: 2.3/km^{2} (6.0/sq mi)
- Time zone: UTC+1 (CET)
  - Summer (DST): UTC+2 (CEST)
- Postal code: 37762

Herguijuela del Campo is a village and municipality in the province of Salamanca, western Spain, part of the autonomous community of Castile-Leon. It is located 44 kilometres (27 mi) from the provincial capital city of Salamanca and has a population of 91 people.

== Geography ==
The municipality covers an area of 26 km^{2} (10 sq mi). It lies 927 metres (3,041 ft) above sea level and the postal code is 37762.
