= La Sierpe =

La Sierpe may refer to:

- La Sierpe, Cuba, a municipality and town
- La Sierpe, Spain, a municipality

== See also ==
- Sierpe, a district in Costa Rica
