= Casafranca =

- Municipality
- Location in Salamanca

- Location in Spain
- Coordinates: 40°36′N 5°45′W
- Country: Spain
- Autonomous community: Castile and León
- Province: Salamanca
- Comarca: Comarca de Guijuelo
- Subcomarca: Entresierras

Government
  - Mayor: José Nicomedes Bueno Martín (People's Party)

Area
  - Total: 30 km^{2} (12 sq mi)
- Elevation: 929 m (3,048 ft)

Population (2025-01-01)
  - Total: 69
  - Density: 2.3/km^{2} (6.0/sq mi)
- Time zone: UTC+1 (CET)
  - Summer (DST): UTC+2 (CEST)
- Postal code: 37767

Casafranca is a village and municipality in the province of Salamanca, western Spain, part of the autonomous community of Castile-Leon. It is located 52 kilometres (32 mi) from the city of Salamanca and as of 2016 has a population of 69 people. The municipality covers an area of 30 km^{2} (12 sq mi).

The village lies 929 metres (3,048 ft) above sea level and the post code is 37767.
