= Pedrosillo de los Aires =

- Municipality
- Flag Coat of arms

- Location in Salamanca
- Coordinates: 40°42′52″N 5°42′18″W
- Country: Spain
- Autonomous community: Castile and León
- Province: Salamanca
- Comarca: Comarca de Guijuelo
- Subcomarca: Salvatierra

Government
  - Mayor: Ángel Alonso Tavera (PSOE)

Area
  - Total: 70 km^{2} (27 sq mi)
- Elevation: 959 m (3,146 ft)

Population (2025-01-01)
  - Total: 312
  - Density: 4.5/km^{2} (12/sq mi)
- Time zone: UTC+1 (CET)
  - Summer (DST): UTC+2 (CEST)
- Postal code: 37788

Pedrosillo de los Aires is a village and large municipality in the province of Salamanca, western Spain, part of the autonomous community of Castile-Leon. It is located 32 kilometres (20 mi) from the provincial capital city of Salamanca and has a population of 384 people.

== Geography ==
The municipality covers an area of 70 km^{2} (27 sq mi). It lies 882 metres (2,894 ft) above sea level and the postal code is 37788.

== See also ==
- List of municipalities in Salamanca
