= Salvatierra de Tormes =

- Municipality
- Coat of arms

- Location in Salamanca
- Coordinates: 40°35′22″N 5°35′47″W
- Country: Spain
- Autonomous community: Castile and León
- Province: Salamanca
- Comarca: Comarca de Guijuelo
- Subcomarca: Salvatierra

Government
  - Mayor: Juan Valle Rodríguez (People's Party)

Area
  - Total: 35 km^{2} (14 sq mi)
- Elevation: 905 m (2,969 ft)

Population (2025-01-01)
  - Total: 66
  - Density: 1.9/km^{2} (4.9/sq mi)
- Time zone: UTC+1 (CET)
  - Summer (DST): UTC+2 (CEST)
- Postal code: 37779

Salvatierra de Tormes is a municipality located in the province of Salamanca, Castile and León, Spain. As of 2016 the municipality has a population of 78 inhabitants.
