= Pizarral =

- Municipality
- Flag Coat of arms

- Location in Salamanca
- Coordinates: 40°36′58″N 5°39′10″W
- Country: Spain
- Autonomous community: Castile and León
- Province: Salamanca
- Comarca: Comarca de Guijuelo
- Subcomarca: Salvatierra

Government
  - Mayor: Ángel Sánchez Ingelmo (People's Party)

Area
  - Total: 17 km^{2} (6.6 sq mi)
- Elevation: 910 m (2,990 ft)

Population (2025-01-01)
  - Total: 70
  - Density: 4.1/km^{2} (11/sq mi)
- Time zone: UTC+1 (CET)
  - Summer (DST): UTC+2 (CEST)
- Postal code: 37795

Pizarral is a municipality located in the province of Salamanca, Castile and León, Spain. As of 2016, the municipality has a population of 50 inhabitants.
