= Aldeavieja de Tormes =

- municipality
- Location in Salamanca

- Location in Spain
- Coordinates: 40°35′00″N 5°37′02″W
- Country: Spain
- Autonomous community: Castile and León
- Province: Salamanca
- Comarca: Comarca de Guijuelo
- Subcomarca: Salvatierra

Government
  - Mayor: Miguel Alonso Rodríguez (People's Party)

Area
  - Total: 13 km^{2} (5.0 sq mi)
- Elevation: 909 m (2,982 ft)

Population (2025-01-01)
  - Total: 100
  - Density: 7.7/km^{2} (20/sq mi)
- Time zone: UTC+1 (CET)
  - Summer (DST): UTC+2 (CEST)
- Postal code: 37779
- Website: www.aldeaviejadetormes.com

Aldeavieja de Tormes is a village and municipality in the province of Salamanca, western Spain, part of the autonomous community of Castile and León. It is located only 50 kilometres (31 mi) from the city of Salamanca and has a population of 104 people.

The village lies 909 metres (2,982 ft) above sea level.
