= José María Gabriel y Galán =

Spanish poet (1870–1905)

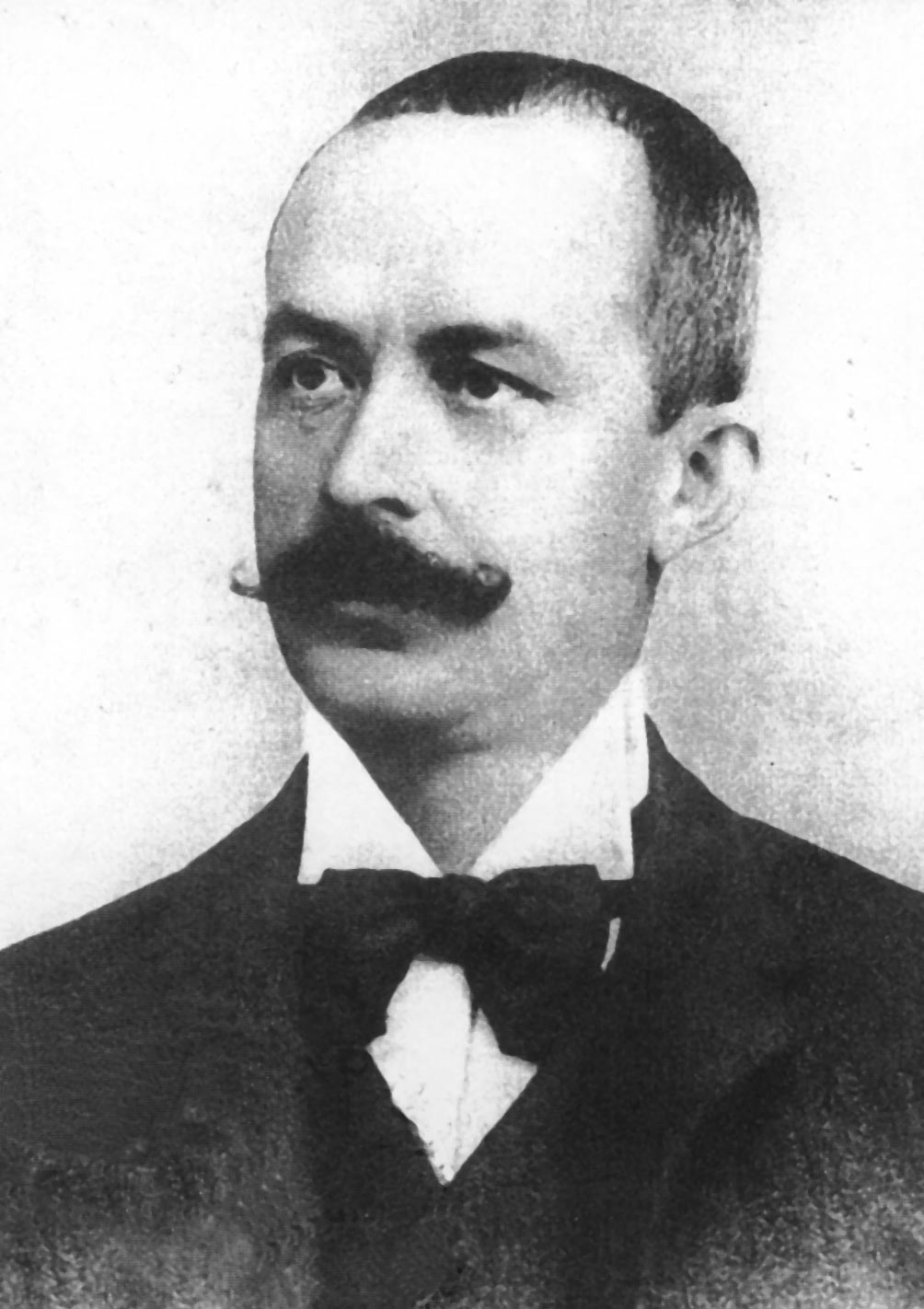
- Born: June 28, 1870; Frades de la Sierra, Spain
- Died: January 6, 1905 (34 years old); Guijo de Granadilla, Spain
- Citizenship: Spanish
- Occupations: Writer, poet, master

José María Gabriel y Galán (28 June 1870, in Frades de la Sierra (Salamanca) - 6 January 1905, in Guijo de Granadilla, Cáceres, España) was a Spanish poet in Castilian and Extremaduran.

He was a teacher in Guijuelo (Salamanca) & Piedrahíta (Ávila). His poetry is quite conservative both in its thematic and its structure: he defended tradition, family, race, catholic dogma or simple rural life.

== Life ==
He was born into a peasant family that owned its own lands. He spent his childhood in his hometown, where he attended school. At 15, he left for Salamanca in order to go on with his studies. His first verses can be traced back to that early period. Simultaneously, he starts working in a textile warehouse.

In 1888, he graduated for being a school teacher and he is assigned a working position in Guijuelo, about 20 km away from his hometown. After a brief stay in Guijuelo, he departs again for Madrid, this time for keeping on with his studies in the Escuela Normal Central ("Normal Central School"). He was to live there for a very short period, for the metropolis caused disgust in him (he actually mentioned it as 'Modernópolis' in some of his letters).

After finishing his studies, he is sent to Piedrahíta (town in the Ávila province), where he puts his newly acquired pedagogic knowledge into practice. Such period of his life is characterised by a gloomy frame of mind, he signed the letters to his friend as "El Solitario" ("The solitary one").

In those years the young teacher develops his characteristic sad and melancholic personality, with profound religious beliefs (which he got from his mother, Bernarda), which can be perceived in his poems.

It wasn't until he met his wife, Desideria, (who she mentions as "Mi vaquerilla" (my little cowgirl)) that he undergoes a radical change, which becomes even deeper from his wedding on, the 26th of January 1898, in Plasencia. He resigns from his job as a teacher and sets up his new residence in Guijo de Granadilla, in the province of Cáceres, where he administers the dehesa El Tejar, property of his wife's uncle. It's there where he can find the time and tranquility for shaping his poetic style. As his first son is born (Jesús, 1898) he writes El Cristu Benditu, the first of his famous Extremeñas.

He died on 6 January 1905, a victim of pneumonia.

The city hall of Guijo de Granadilla currently still maintains the house in which he lived, as a museum devoted to him, where his manuscripts and personal objects are displayed (all of which were donated by his heirs).

== Works ==
His poetry cannot be included within the modernist movement of that time, for it contains many of the more conservative elements present both in the structure and topics of the poems: he defends tradition, family, lineage, catholic dogma or the virtue of the peasant's life. Besides, his poetry contains archaic words aplenty, which had already fallen out of use by that time, which convey manners and customs of a former epoch.

Collections of poems:

- Castellanas (1902)
- Extremeñas (1902)
- Campesinas (1904)
- Nuevas Castellanas (1905)
- Religiosas (1906)

His works exerted influence on many posterior writers, such as:

- Mario Simón Arias-Camisón
- Luis Chamizo Trigueros
- Miguel y Elisa Herrero Uceda

== See also ==
- Las Hurdes
