= Beher =

Beher may refer to:

- Beher (company), or Bernardo Hernández, Spanish ham producer
- Beher (poetry), a type of meter in Urdu poetry
- Beher (god), an Aksumite god
