= Coquilla =

Coquilla may refer to:

- Al Coquilla, a Filipino boxer who lost a 1994 match to Lester Ellis for the vacant IBO light welterweight title
- Hans Coquilla, a contestant on Project Runway Philippines (season 2)
- Teodulo Coquilla, a defeated incumbent in the 2010 Philippine House of Representatives elections
- a hamlet in the municipality of Membribe de la Sierra, Spain
- Coquilla nut, the nut of the South American palm tree Attalea funifera
