= Frades de la Sierra =

- Municipality
- Location in Salamanca
- Coordinates: 40°39′32″N 5°46′49″W
- Country: Spain
- Autonomous community: Castile and León
- Province: Salamanca
- Comarca: Comarca de Guijuelo
- Subcomarca: Entresierras

Government
  - Mayor: Andrés Pablo Melchor (PSOE)

Area
  - Total: 28 km^{2} (11 sq mi)
- Elevation: 976 m (3,202 ft)

Population (2025-01-01)
  - Total: 163
  - Density: 5.8/km^{2} (15/sq mi)
- Time zone: UTC+1 (CET)
  - Summer (DST): UTC+2 (CEST)
- Postal code: 37457

Frades de la Sierra is a village and municipality in the province of Salamanca, western Spain, part of the autonomous community of Castile and León. It is located 39 kilometres (24 mi) from the provincial capital city of Salamanca and has a population of 208 people.

== Geography ==
The municipality covers an area of 28 km^{2} (11 sq mi). It lies 976 metres (3,202 ft) above sea level and the postal code is 37457.

== Economy ==
- The basis of the economy is agriculture.

== Culture ==
It is the birthplace of Spanish poet José María Gabriel y Galán.
