= Los Santos, Castile and León =

Los Santos
- Municipality
- Coat of arms

- Location in Salamanca
- Coordinates: 40°33′1″N 5°48′0″W
- Country: Spain
- Autonomous community: Castile and León
- Province: Salamanca
- Comarca: Comarca de Guijuelo
- Subcomarca: Entresierras

Government
  - Mayor: Juan Morato Morato (People's Party)

Area
  - Total: 44 km^{2} (17 sq mi)
- Elevation: 948 m (3,110 ft)

Population (2025-01-01)
  - Total: 570
  - Density: 13/km^{2} (34/sq mi)
- Time zone: UTC+1 (CET)
  - Summer (DST): UTC+2 (CEST)
- Postal code: 37768

Los Santos is a municipality located in the province of Salamanca, Castile and León, Spain.

== Notable people ==
- Isaura Marcos (born 1959), cloistered nun, photographer

== See also ==
- Los Santos mine
