= Montejo, Salamanca =

Montejo
- Municipality
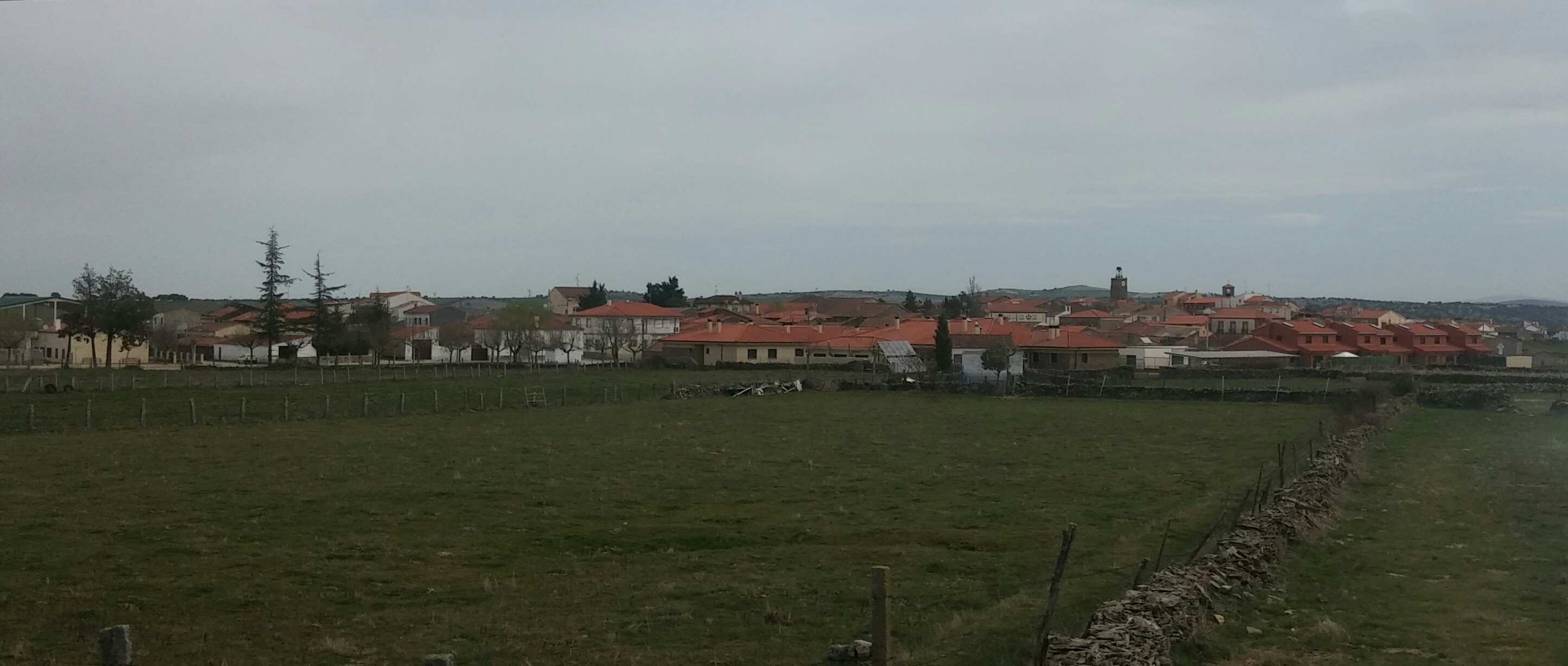

- Flag Coat of arms

- Location in Salamanca

- Location in Spain
- Coordinates: 40°37′54″N 5°37′25″W
- Country: Spain
- Autonomous community: Castile and León
- Province: Salamanca
- Comarca: Comarca de Guijuelo
- Subcomarca: Salvatierra

Government
  - Mayor: Eloy García Sánchez (People's Party)

Area
  - Total: 29 km^{2} (11 sq mi)
- Elevation: 931 m (3,054 ft)

Population (2025-01-01)
  - Total: 186
  - Density: 6.4/km^{2} (17/sq mi)
- Time zone: UTC+1 (CET)
  - Summer (DST): UTC+2 (CEST)
- Postal code: 37795

Montejo is a municipality located in the province of Salamanca, Castile and León, Spain. As of 2016 the municipality has a population of 207 inhabitants.

== See also ==
- Countess of Montijo
