= Endrinal =

- Municipality
- Location in Salamanca

- Location in Spain
- Coordinates: 40°35′28″N 5°48′17″W
- Country: Spain
- Autonomous community: Castile and León
- Province: Salamanca
- Comarca: Comarca de Guijuelo
- Subcomarca: Entresierras

Government
  - Mayor: Manuel Sousa Santos (People's Party)

Area
  - Total: 34 km^{2} (13 sq mi)
- Elevation: 929 m (3,048 ft)

Population (2025-01-01)
  - Total: 201
  - Density: 5.9/km^{2} (15/sq mi)
- Time zone: UTC+1 (CET)
  - Summer (DST): UTC+2 (CEST)
- Postal code: 37766

Endrinal is a village and municipality in the province of Salamanca, western Spain, part of the autonomous community of Castile-Leon. It is located 49 kilometres (30 mi) from the provincial capital city of Salamanca and has a population of 233 people.

== Geography ==
The municipality covers an area of 34 km^{2} (13 sq mi). It lies 929 metres (3,048 ft) above sea level and the postal code is 37766.
