= Berrocal de Salvatierra =

- Municipality
- Flag Coat of arms

- Location in Salamanca

- Location in Spain
- Coordinates: 40°38′00″N 5°41′22″W
- Country: Spain
- Autonomous community: Castile and León
- Province: Salamanca
- Comarca: Comarca de Guijuelo
- Subcomarca: Salvatierra

Government
  - Mayor: Manuel Ramos Rodríguez (People's Party)

Area
  - Total: 30.55 km^{2} (11.80 sq mi)
- Elevation: 900 m (3,000 ft)

Population (2025-01-01)
  - Total: 74
  - Density: 2.4/km^{2} (6.3/sq mi)
- Time zone: UTC+1 (CET)
  - Summer (DST): UTC+2 (CEST)
- Postal code: 37795

Berrocal de Salvatierra is a village and municipality in the province of Salamanca, western Spain, part of the autonomous community of Castile-Leon. It is 45 kilometres (28 mi) from the provincial capital city of Salamanca and has a population of 91 people.

It lies 900 metres (3,000 ft) above sea level and the postal code is 37795.
