= Membribe de la Sierra =

- Municipality
- Location in Salamanca
- Coordinates: 40°42′1″N 5°48′0″W
- Country: Spain
- Autonomous community: Castile and León
- Province: Salamanca
- Comarca: Comarca de Guijuelo
- Subcomarca: Entresierras

Government
  - Mayor: El Patron Segismundo Gomez Bullon (People's Party)

Area
  - Total: 47 km^{2} (18 sq mi)
- Elevation: 1,035 m (3,396 ft)

Population (2025-01-01)
  - Total: 101
  - Density: 2.1/km^{2} (5.6/sq mi)
- Time zone: UTC+1 (CET)
  - Summer (DST): UTC+2 (CEST)
- Postal code: 37766

Membribe de la Sierra is a village and municipality in the province of Salamanca, western Spain, part of the autonomous community of Castile-Leon. It is located 35 kilometres (22 mi) from the provincial capital city of Salamanca and has a population of 124 people.

== Geography ==
The municipality covers an area of 47 km^{2} (18 sq mi). It lies 1,035 metres (3,396 ft) above sea level and the postal code is 37766.

The municipality has the hamlets Coquilla (5 hab.), Garriel, Navagallega and Segovia del Doctor which only have a family in each.

== See also ==
- List of municipalities in Salamanca
