= Isaura Marcos =

Spanish nun (born 1959)

Sor Isaura Marcos
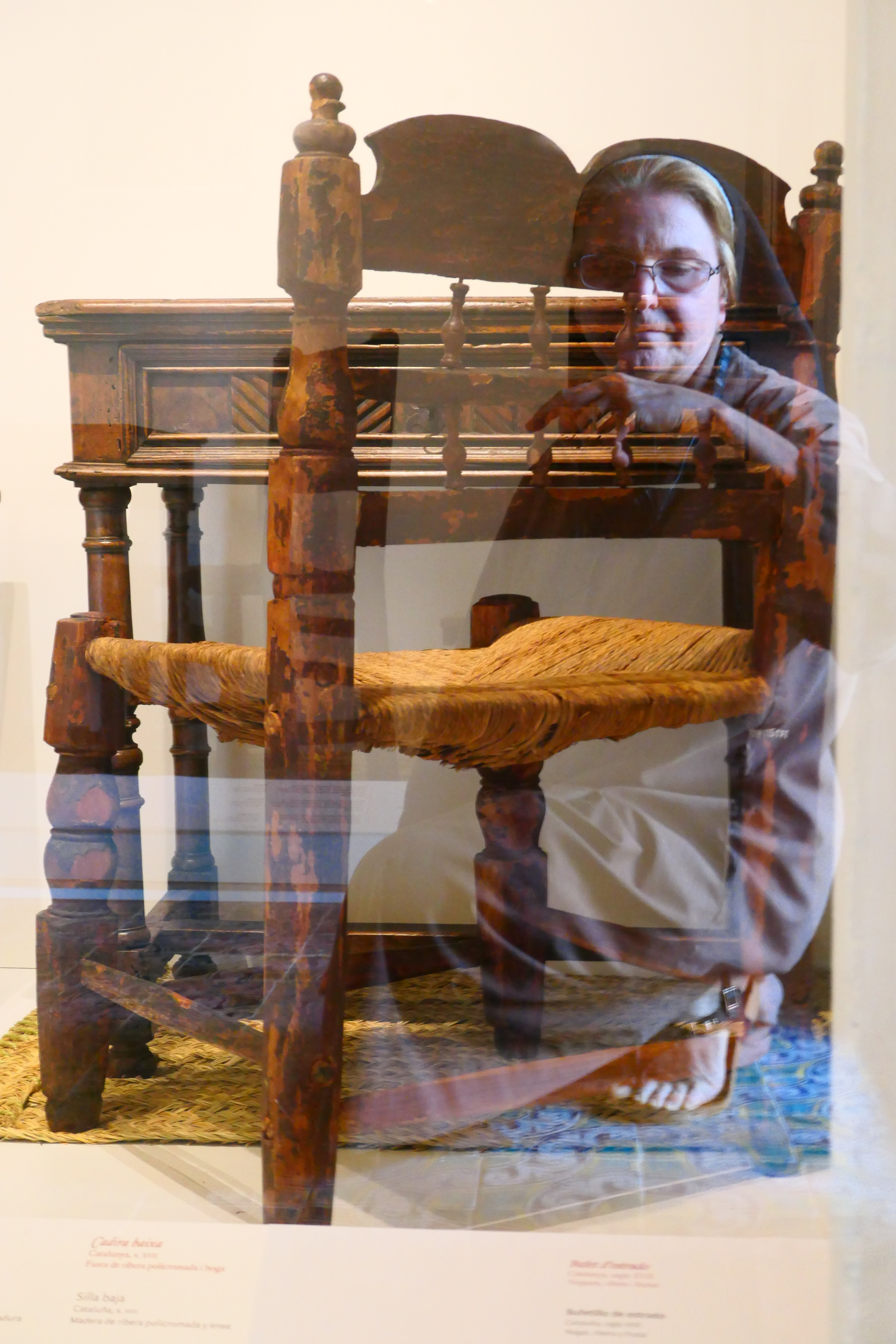
- (2018)

Personal life
- Born: Isaura Marcos Sánchez; 13 January 1959 (age 67) Los Santos, Salamanca, Spain
- Parents: Benedicto Marcos Curto (father); Isaura Sánchez Gómez (mother)

Religious life
- Religion: Roman Catholic
- Sect: Poor Clares at the Monastery of Pedralbes
- Profession: nun; photographer

Sor Isaura Marcos Sánchez (Los Santos, Salamanca, 13 January 1959) is a Spanish cloistered nun of the Poor Clares order at the Monastery of Pedralbes whose photographs are based on a peculiar reflection technique that avoids the use of digital retouching programs. The whole reality of the monastery is what shapes the subject matter of her works, which are dedicated exclusively to charitable purposes.

== Biography ==
Isaura was the youngest of the six children of Benedicto Marcos Curto and Isaura Sánchez Gómez. As a teenager, she was attracted to monastic life. When in Barcelona, where one of her brothers lived, she decided to visit different ecclesiastical communities. She was deeply impressed by the Franciscan charism of the Poor Clare Sisters of the Monastery of Santa Maria de Pedralbes, founded in 1326 by Queen Elisenda of Montcada, and therefore decided to enter the order in 1976, when she was seventeen years old. In 2009, she was initiated into the field of photography in a self-taught way. Her creations are the expression of her way of understanding the contemplative life, following the rule of Saint Clare of Assisi of 1211.

== Artistic career ==
In 2009, she began her unique photographic work using a curious technique based on reflections. Although the result of her work might suggest otherwise, she never uses digital image retouching programs. Her work also includes abstract compositions.

In March 2019, on the occasion of Pope Francis' visit to Rabat, Morocco, 114 photographs taken by Sister Isaura illustrating the Canticle of the Sun of St. Francis of Assisi were exhibited at the Prince Moulay Abdellah Stadium, where Pope Francis officiated a multitudinous mass to commemorate the 800 years of presence of the Franciscan Order in the African country.

On June 23, 2024, in the cloister of San Damiano, Assisi, she presented the photographic exhibition of the book Clara de Asís, espejo fuera del tiempo (Clare of Assisi, mirror out of time), with 51 photographs taken in the monastery of Pedralbes. The photographs were also exhibited in the different rooms in which St. Clare stayed throughout her conventual life.

She has collaborated with several charities including: Caritas Internationalis, Acció Solidària, UNHCR, Fundació Arrels, and Fundació Convent de Santa Clara.

== Selected works ==
- Clara de Asís, espejo fuera del tiempo. Kuster, Niklaus; Jou, David; Rodríguez Branchat, Rosa; & Marcos, Sor Isaura (photographs). (Ediciones Invisibles, 2024)
- En la teva llum / En tu luz. Poems by David Jou Mirabent; photographs by Sor Isaura. (Editorial Viena, 2022)
- Todo va a salir bien. Microrrelatos en tiempos de pandemia. (Editorial San Pablo, 2020)
- Reflejos del Cántico de las criaturas. Creative photography with commentary. Text by Rosa Rodríguez Branchat. (Editorial San Pablo, 2019)
- Calendar Belleza reflejada. Photographs inspired by each of the months of 2020. (Editorial San Pablo, 2019)

== Photography ==
Photos used as bookcovers by Antoni Matabosch i Soler:

- D'on venim. On hem d'anar. (CPL, 2024)
- La penúltima paraula. Viena Edicions, 2023
- El pelegrinatge ecumènic del Vaticà II als nostres dies. (Centre de Pastoral Litúrgica, 2023)
- Sociedad plural y religiones. Editorial (San Pablo, 2022)
- Ecologia integral i supervivència. Editado por el Arzobispado de Barcelona, 2019.
