= Monleón =

- Municipality
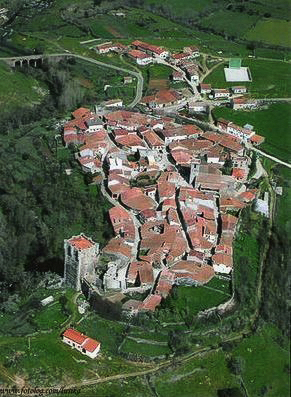

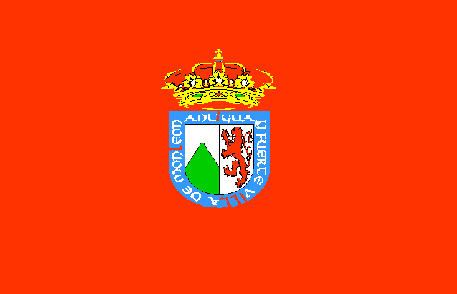
- Flag Coat of arms

- Location in Salamanca
- Coordinates: 40°35′9″N 5°50′50″W
- Country: Spain
- Autonomous community: Castile and León
- Province: Salamanca
- Comarca: Comarca de Guijuelo
- Subcomarca: Entresierras

Government
  - Mayor: Juan María de Arriba Diaz (People's Party)

Area
  - Total: 19 km^{2} (7.3 sq mi)
- Elevation: 878 m (2,881 ft)

Population (2025-01-01)
  - Total: 88
  - Density: 4.6/km^{2} (12/sq mi)
- Time zone: UTC+1 (CET)
  - Summer (DST): UTC+2 (CEST)
- Postal code: 37765

Monleón is a municipality located in the province of Salamanca, Castile and León, Spain. As of 2016 the municipality has a population of 90 inhabitants.
