= Entresierras =

- Comarca
- Location in Salamanca
- Coordinates: 40°34′5″N 5°47′15″W
- Country: Spain
- Autonomous community: Castile and León
- Province: Salamanca
- Comarca: Comarca de Guijuelo

Area
  - Total: 234.18 km^{2} (90.42 sq mi)

Population (2010)
  - Total: 1,618
  - Density: 6.909/km^{2} (17.89/sq mi)
- Time zone: UTC+1 (CET)
  - Summer (DST): UTC+2 (CEST)

Entresierras is a subcomarca of Guijuelo in the province of Salamanca, Castile and León, Spain. It contains the municipalities of Casafranca, Endrinal, Frades de la Sierra, Herguijuela, La Sierpe, Los Santos, Membribe de la Sierra and Monleón.
