= Fuenterroble de Salvatierra =

- Municipality
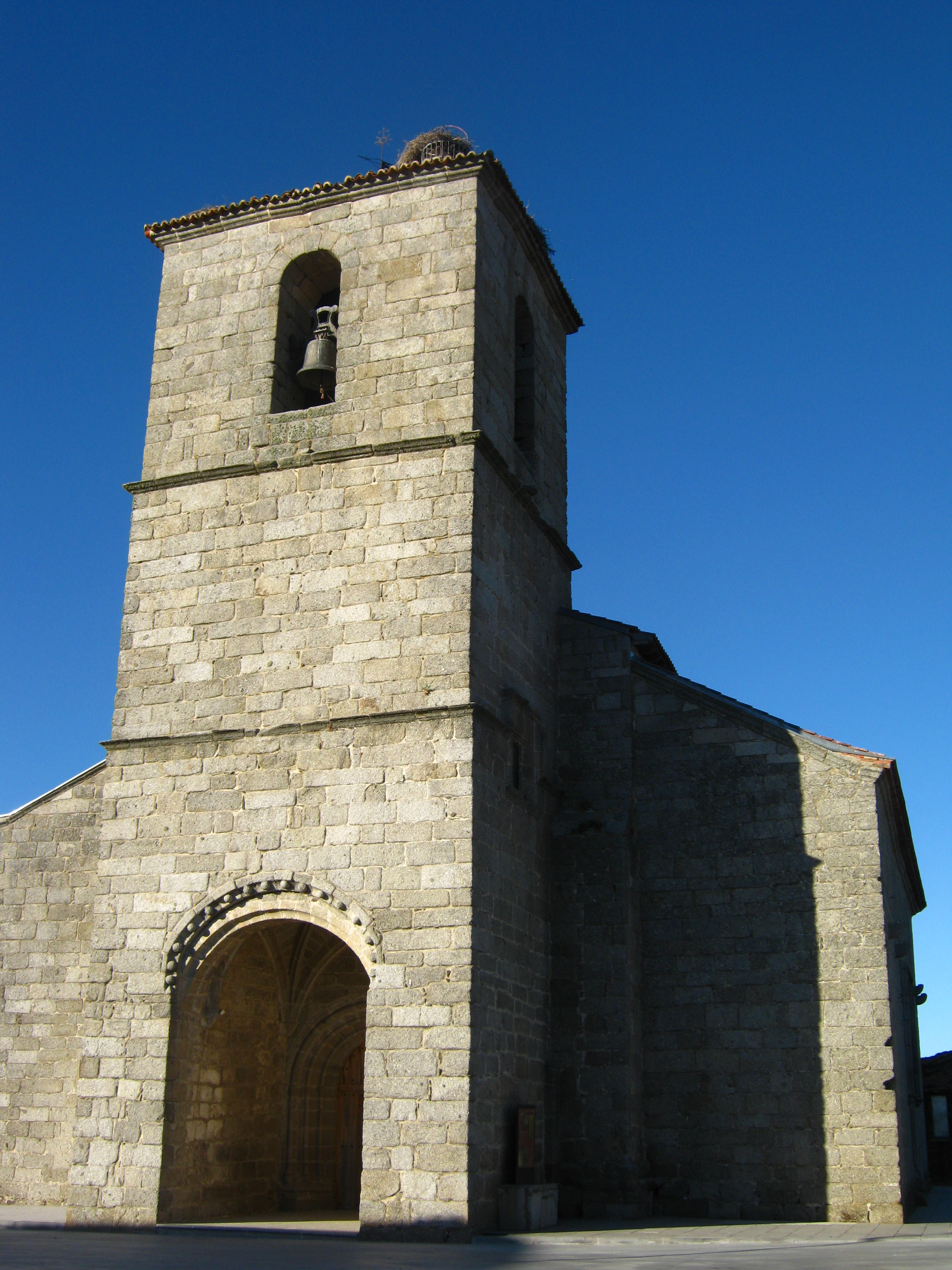

- Coat of arms

- Location in Salamanca

- Location in Spain
- Coordinates: 40°33′53″N 5°44′2″W
- Country: Spain
- Autonomous community: Castile and León
- Province: Salamanca
- Comarca: Comarca de Guijuelo
- Subcomarca: Salvatierra

Government
  - Mayor: Juan José Serrano García (PSOE)

Area
  - Total: 27 km^{2} (10 sq mi)
- Elevation: 951 m (3,120 ft)

Population (2025-01-01)
  - Total: 260
  - Density: 9.6/km^{2} (25/sq mi)
- Time zone: UTC+1 (CET)
  - Summer (DST): UTC+2 (CEST)
- Postal code: 37768

Fuenterroble de Salvatierra is a village and municipality in the province of Salamanca, western Spain, part of the autonomous community of Castile-Leon. It is located 54 kilometres (34 mi) from the provincial capital city of Salamanca and has a population of 243 people.

== Geography ==
The municipality covers an area of 27 square kilometres (10 sq mi) and lies 951 metres (3,120 ft) above sea level and the postal code is 37768.

== See also ==
- Los Santos mine
