= La Sierpe, Spain =

La Sierpe
- Municipality
- Location in Salamanca
- Coordinates: 40°38′42″N 5°51′20″W
- Country: Spain
- Autonomous community: Castile and León
- Province: Salamanca
- Comarca: Comarca de Guijuelo
- Subcomarca: Entresierras

Government
  - Mayor: Valeriano de Castro (People's Party)

Area
  - Total: 48 km^{2} (19 sq mi)
- Elevation: 927 m (3,041 ft)

Population (2025-01-01)
  - Total: 41
  - Density: 0.85/km^{2} (2.2/sq mi)
- Time zone: UTC+1 (CET)
  - Summer (DST): UTC+2 (CEST)
- Postal code: 37759

La Sierpe is a municipality located in the province of Salamanca, Castile and León, Spain. As of 2016 the municipality had a population of 48.
