= Llanos de Albacete =

Coordinates: 39°02′33″N 2°02′32″W

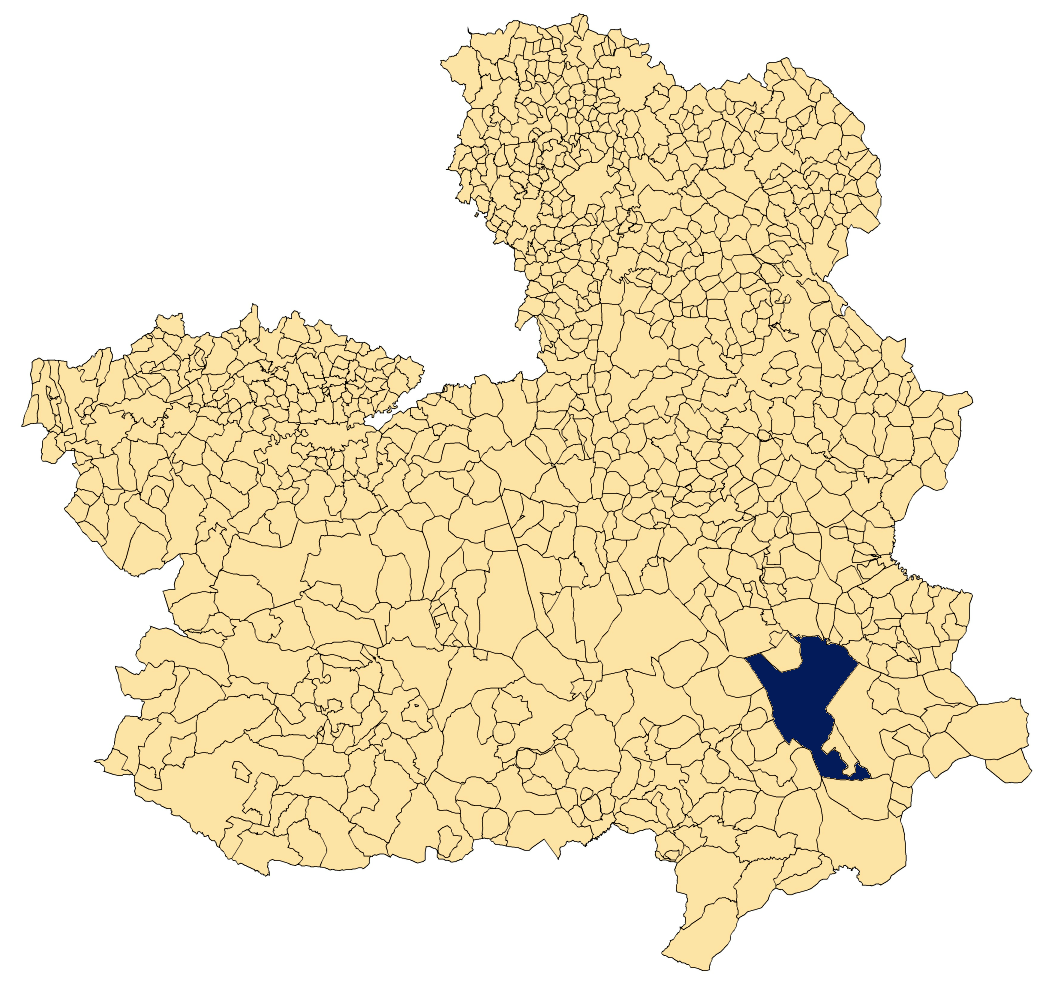
The map of Llanos de Albacete

Llanos de Albacete is a comarca of the Province of Albacete, Spain.
