= Salvaterra =

Salvaterra is a common toponym in the Galician and Portuguese languages. It may refer to:

- Salvaterra, Pará, a municipality in Pará, Brazil
- Monfortinho e Salvaterra do Extremo, a civil parish in Idanha-a-Nova, Portugal
- Salvaterra de Magos, a municipality in Alentejo, Portugal
  - Salvaterra de Magos e Foros de Salvaterra, a civil parish
- Salvaterra de Miño, a municipality in Galicia, Spain

== See also ==
- Salvatierra (disambiguation), the Spanish equivalent
