= Comarca de Guijuelo =

- Comarca
- Location in Salamanca
- Coordinates: 40°33′32″N 5°40′29″W
- Country: Spain
- Autonomous community: Castile and León
- Province: Salamanca

Area
  - Total: 702.32 km^{2} (271.17 sq mi)

Population (2010)
  - Total: 10,373
  - Density: 14.770/km^{2} (38.253/sq mi)
- Time zone: UTC+1 (CET)
  - Summer (DST): UTC+2 (CEST)

Comarca de Guijuelo is a comarca in the province of Salamanca, Castile and León. It contains the following subcomarcas:

- Entresierras, which contains the municipalities of Casafranca, Endrinal, Frades de la Sierra, Herguijuela, La Sierpe, Los Santos, Membribe de la Sierra and Monleón.
- Salvatierra, which contains the municipalities of Aldeavieja de Tormes, Berrocal, Fuenterroble, Guijuelo, Montejo, Pedrosillo de los Aires, Pizarral and Salvatierra de Tormes.
- Alto Tormes, which contains the municipalities of Cespedosa de Tormes, Gallegos de Solmirón, Navamorales, Puente del Congosto, El Tejado, Guijo de Ávila and La Tala.
