= La Manchuela (Albacete) =

Place in Spain

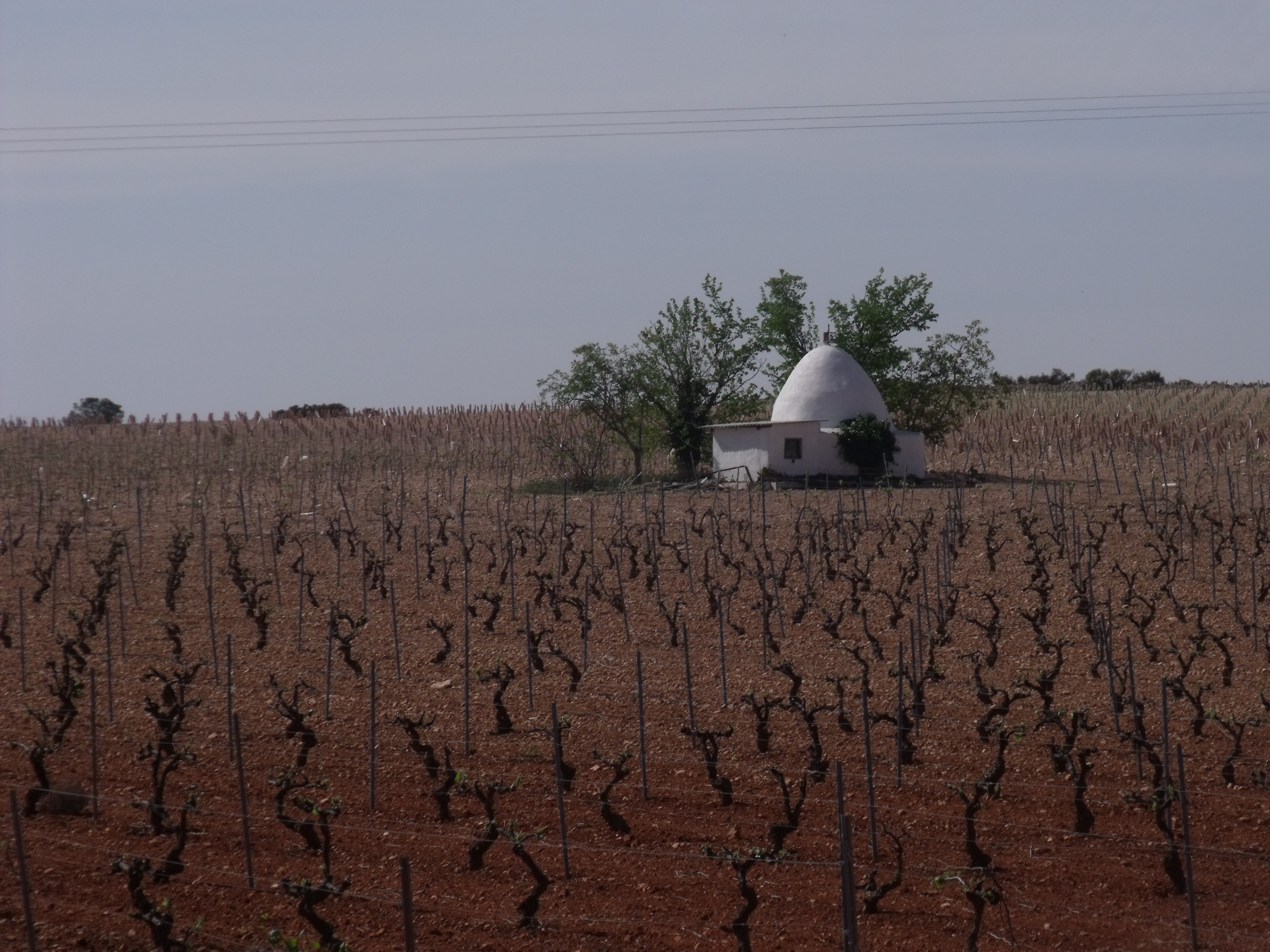
Cuco on a vineyard

La Manchuela (Albacete) is a comarca of the Province of Albacete, Spain.
