= Salvatierra (comarca) =

- Comarca
- Location in Salamanca
- Country: Spain
- Autonomous community: Castile and León
- Province: Salamanca
- Comarca: Comarca de Guijuelo

Area
  - Total: 284.72 km^{2} (109.93 sq mi)

Population (2014)
  - Total: 6,939
  - Density: 24.37/km^{2} (63.12/sq mi)
- Time zone: UTC+1 (CET)
  - Summer (DST): UTC+2 (CEST)

Salvatierra is a subcomarca of Guijuelo in the province of Salamanca, Castile and León, Spain. It contains eight municipalities:

- Aldeavieja de Tormes
- Berrocal
- Fuenterroble
- Guijuelo
- Montejo
- Pedrosillo de los Aires
- Pizarral
- Salvatierra de Tormes
