= Guijuelo =

- Municipality
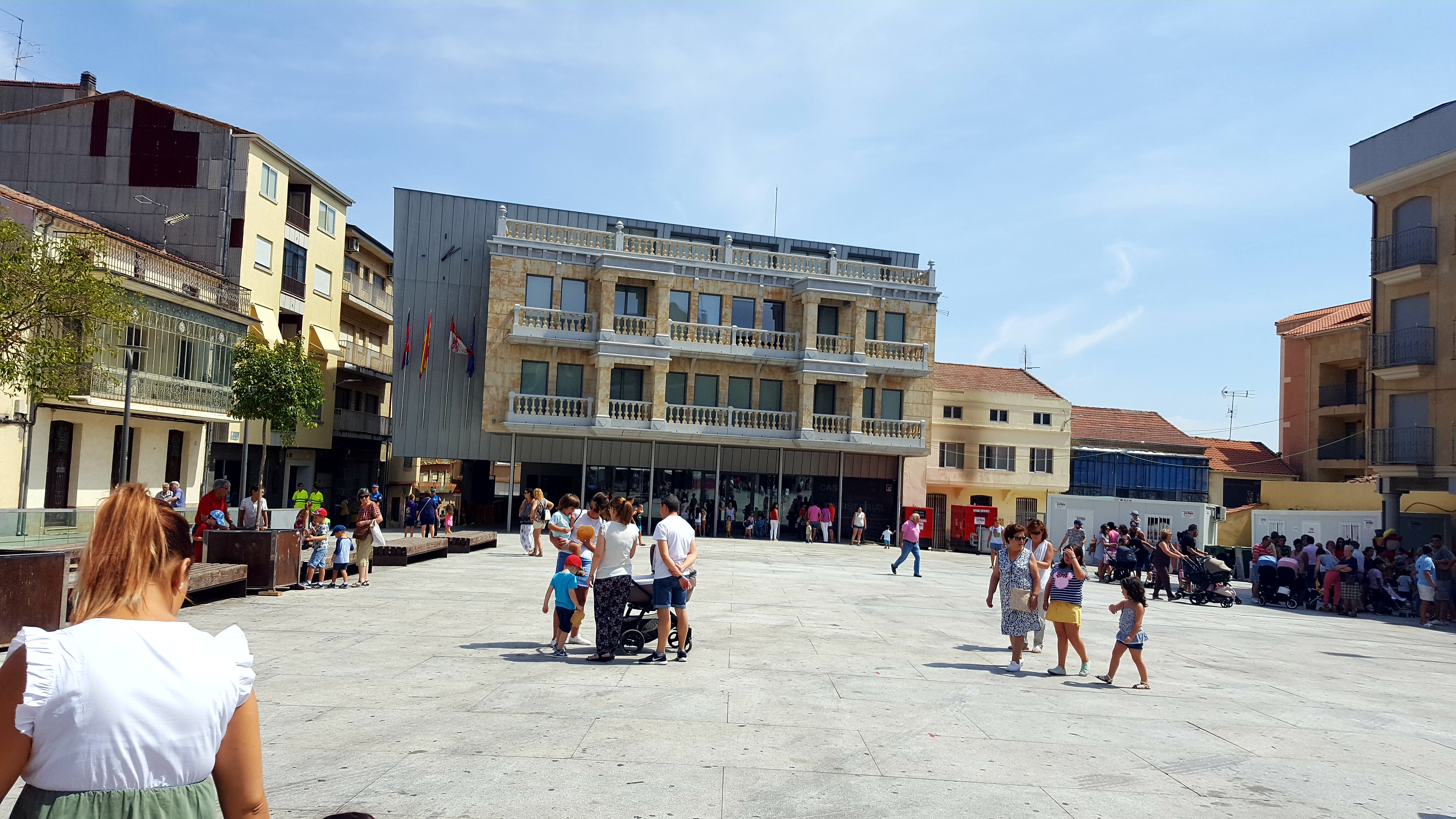
- Town hall

- Flag Coat of arms

- Location in Salamanca

- Location in Castile and León Location in Spain
- Coordinates: 40°33′27″N 5°40′17″W
- Country: Spain
- Autonomous community: Castile and León
- Province: Salamanca
- Comarca: Comarca de Guijuelo
- Subcomarca: Salvatierra

Government
  - Mayor: Francisco Julian Ramos Manzano (People's Party)

Area
  - Total: 63 km^{2} (24 sq mi)
- Elevation: 1,010 m (3,310 ft)

Population (2025-01-01)
  - Total: 5,427
  - Density: 86/km^{2} (220/sq mi)
- Time zone: UTC+1 (CET)
  - Summer (DST): UTC+2 (CEST)
- Postal code: 37770

Guijuelo (Spanish pronunciation: [giˈxwelo]) is a municipality located in the province of Salamanca, Castile and León, Spain. As of 2016 the municipality has a population of 5630 inhabitants.

== See also ==
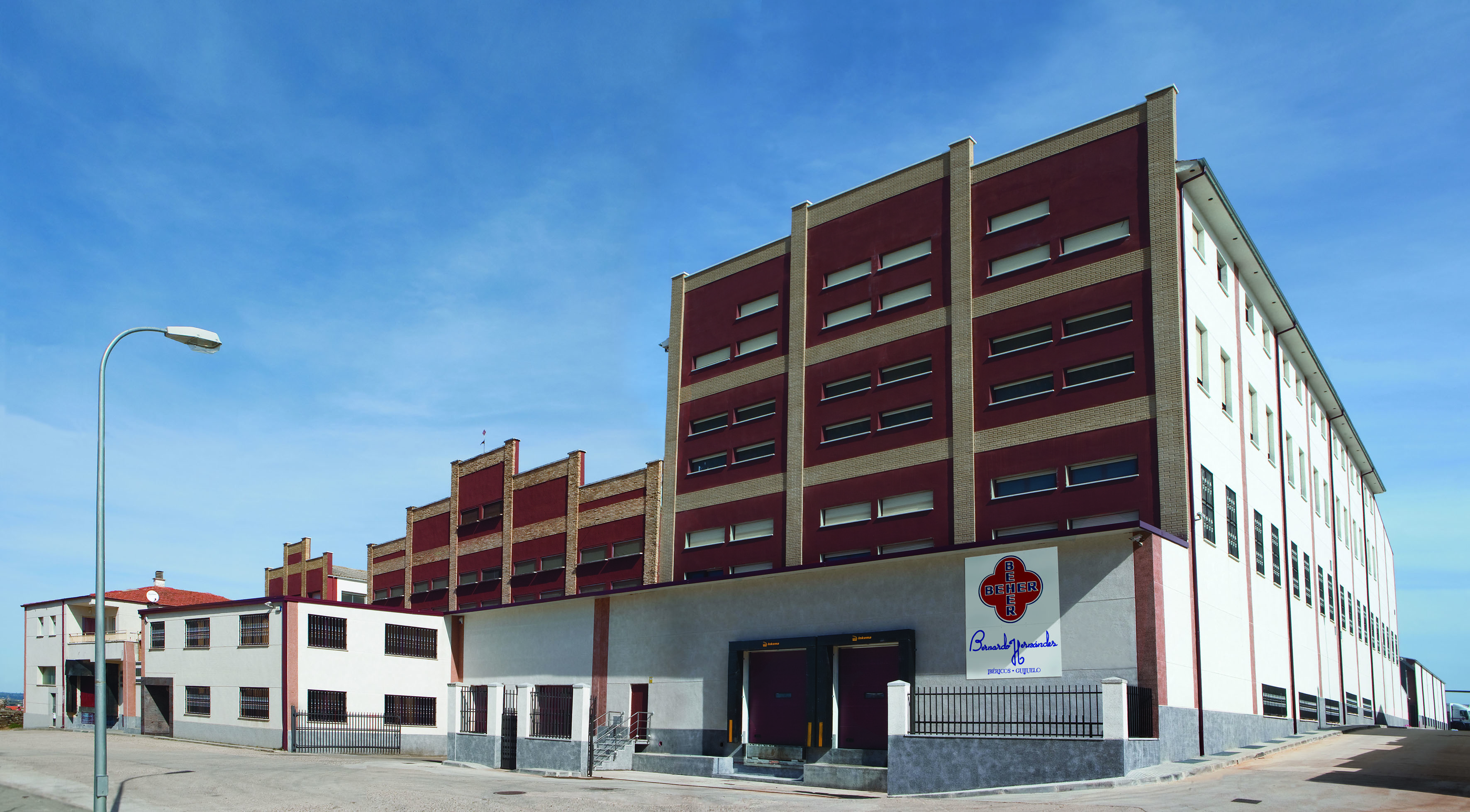
The Beher headquarters are in Guijuelo.

- CD Guijuelo, the football club of this municipality.
