= Almarza =

- Municipality
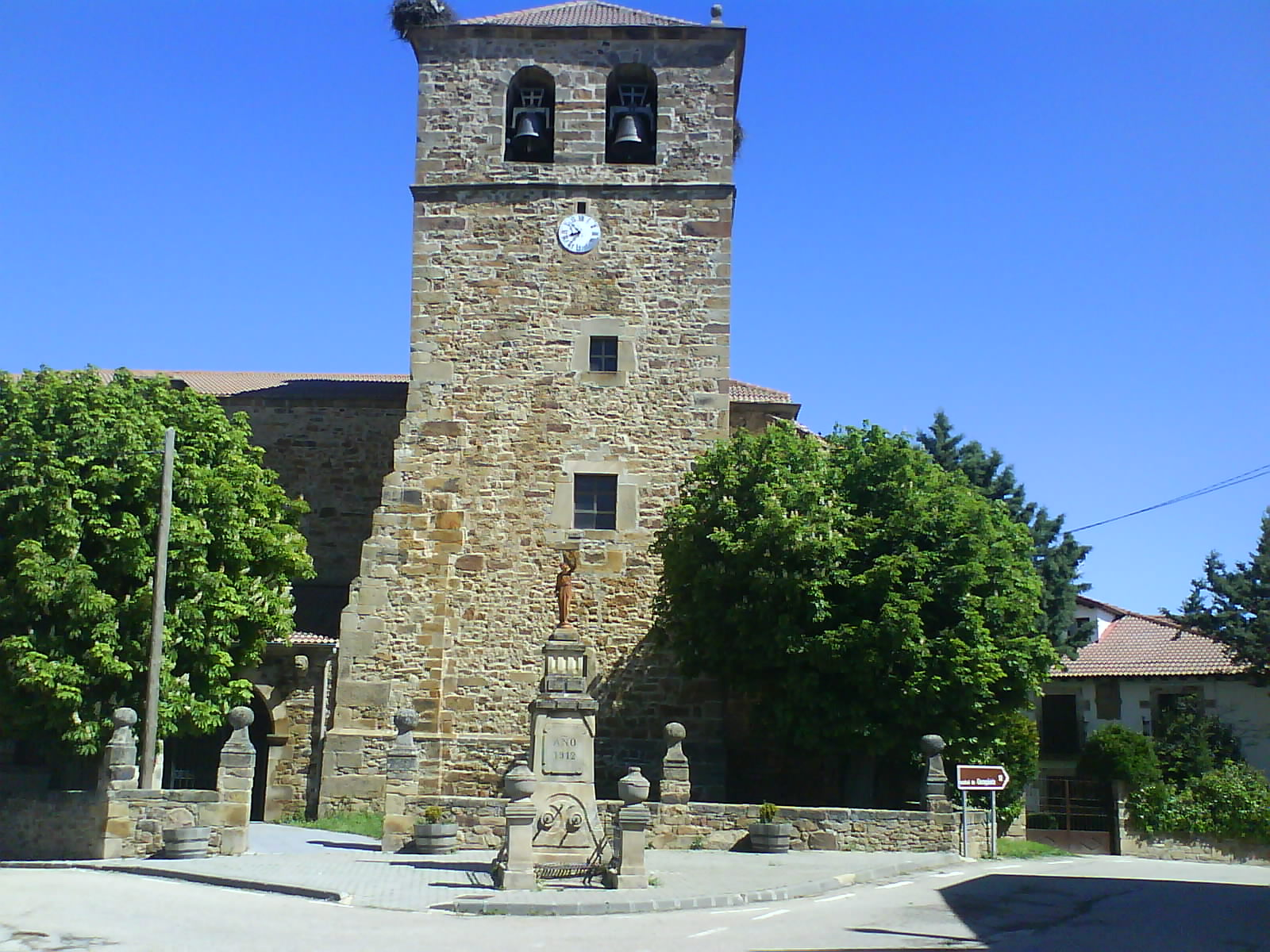

- Coat of arms

- Location in Spain. Almarza (Spain)
- Country: Spain
- Autonomous community: Castile and León
- Province: Soria
- Municipality: Almarza

Area
  - Total: 100 km^{2} (39 sq mi)

Population (2025-01-01)
  - Total: 601
  - Density: 6.0/km^{2} (16/sq mi)
- Time zone: UTC+1 (CET)
  - Summer (DST): UTC+2 (CEST)
- Website: Official website

Almarza is a municipality located in the province of Soria, Castile and León, Spain. According to the 2004 census (INE), the municipality has a population of 609 inhabitants.
