= Beher (company) =

Spanish ham producer company

Coordinates: 40.554259°N 5.667143°W

BEHER - Bernardo Hernández
- Company type: Ltd
- Industry: Food
- Founded: 1930; 96 years ago
- Founder: Bernardo Hernández Blázquez
- Headquarters: Guijuelo, Spain
- Area served: Worldwide
- Key people: Bernardo Hernández Tinoco (Chairman and CEO)
- Products: Jamón ibérico and Meat products
- Revenue: €20 million
- Number of employees: 90
- Website: www.beher.com/en/

Beher (stylised as BEHER) and also called Bernardo Hernández, is a Spanish ham producer company that has worldwide fame. It is situated in the town of Guijuelo (province of Salamanca, Spain), in the Protected Designation of Origin (PDO) Jamón de Guijuelo. This third generation family company was founded in the 1930s and is now one of the 300 biggest companies in Castile and León.

In 2001 and 2004 it was awarded "Best international company" during the International Fair in Frankfurt, the main international fair of meat products. Among the many products of Beher "Bellota Oro" (Gold Acorn) stands out, in 2007, 2010 and 2013 it was awarded "Best ham in the world".

== History ==
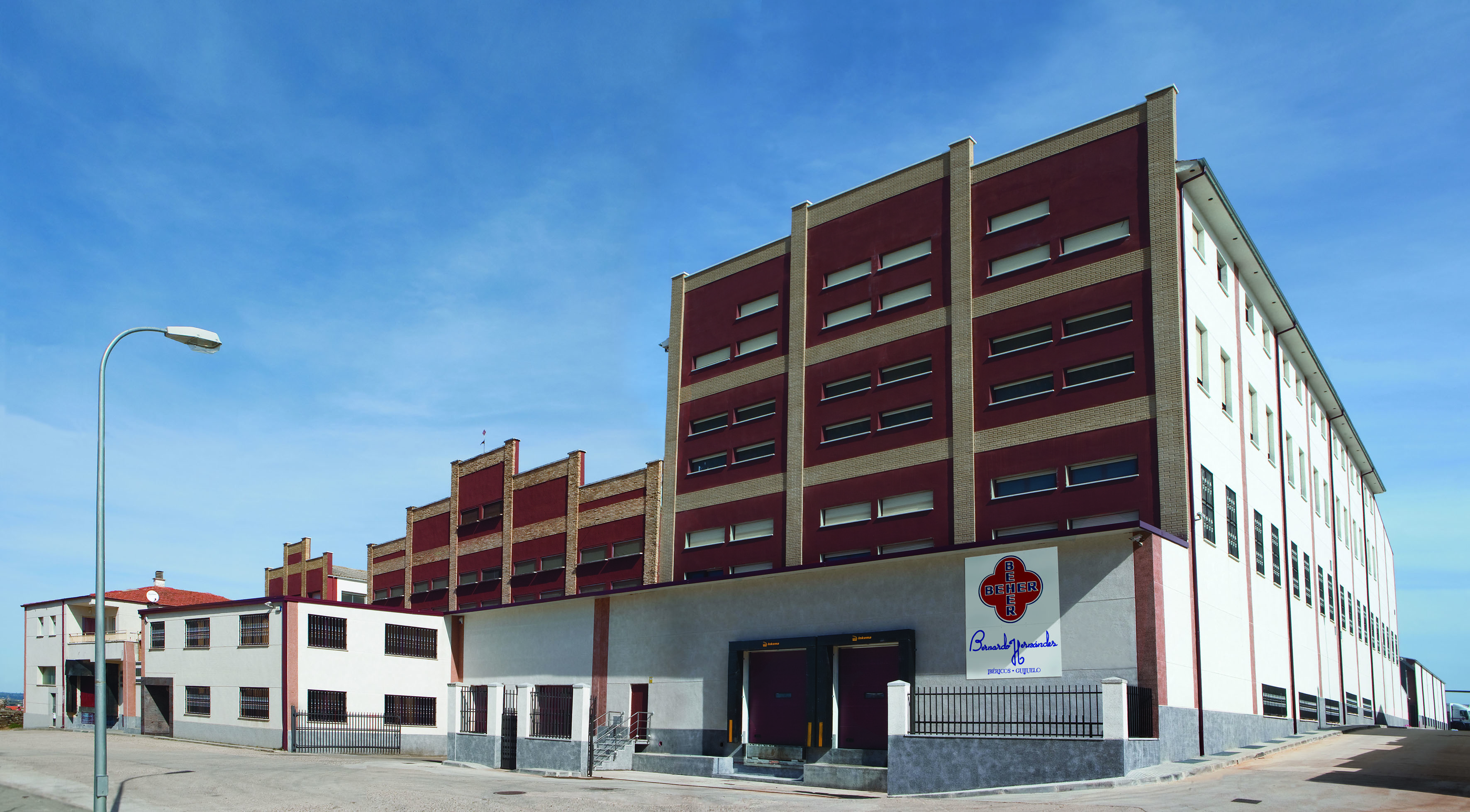
BEHER headquarters in Guijuelo

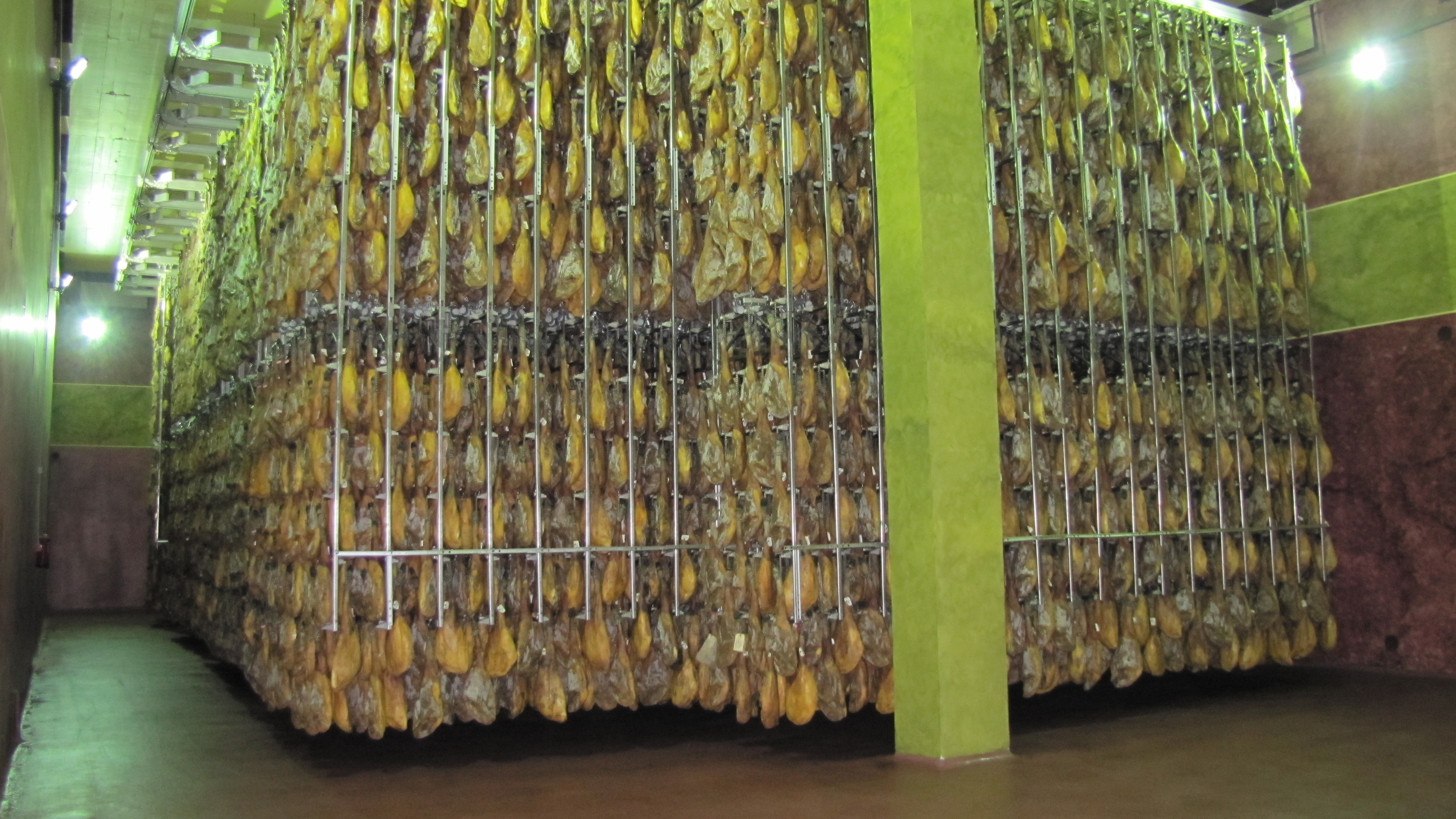
Cellar of acorn-fed hams of BEHER in Guijuelo

In the beginning of the 1930s, Bernardo Hernández Blázquez began his business in the sector of "Pig slaughter" using family experience to integrate completely into the market. In the 1970s the founder's son Bernardo Hernández García took the company’s management in his hands and began to rear Iberian pigs in his private pastures. Nowadays his sons manage one of the 6 best companies in the sector with 2% percentage of the market. The products of BEHER are exported to more than 30 countries all over the world such as Brazil, South Korea, Japan, Hong Kong, Russia and the European Union.

In 2010, new installations were inaugurated and now the size of the factory reaches 19.500 m2, including the highest cellar in the Protected Designation of Origin (PDO) which is 8 meters high.

== Products ==
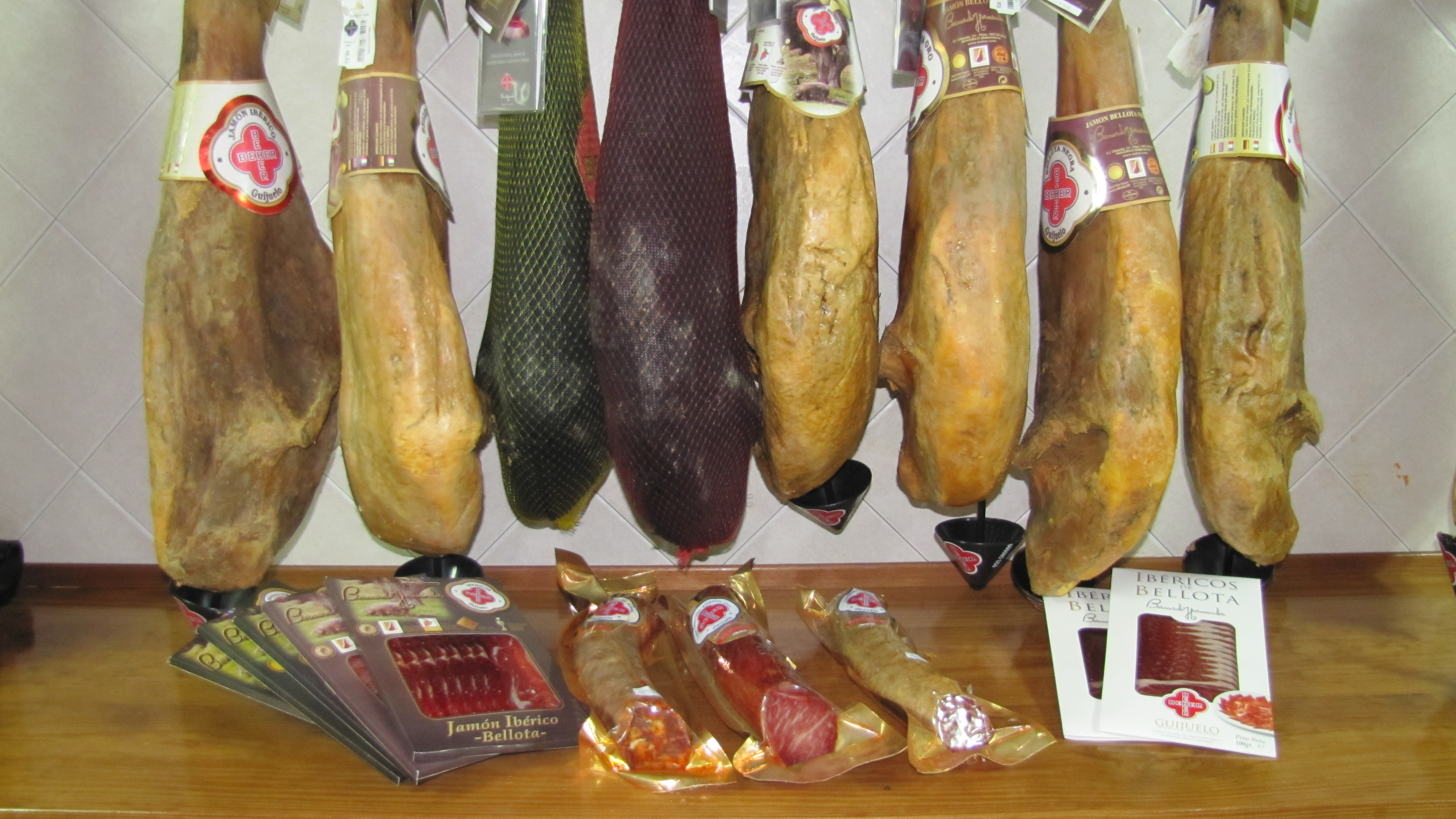
Exposition of "embutidos" (sausage goods) and acorn-fed ham with PDO Jamón de Guijuelo of BEHER

BEHER embraces all stages of the manufacturing process, from rearing pigs on its farms to manual cutting of the ham, getting a homogeneous production and world-wide recognition in the sector of sausage products, cold meats and collations.

- Acorn-fed Jamón ibérico (Iberian ham).
- Acorn-fed Iberian sausage products: loin (lomo), pork sausage (chorizo), salami (longaniza), bacon (panceta) and summer sausage (salchichón).

== Products lines ==
- Etiqueta Oro (Gold Label): Acorn-fed back-leg and front-leg Jamón ibérico ham. Chosen because of its wealth of oleic acid.
- Etiqueta Negra (Black Label): acorn-fed ham.
- Red Label (Etiqueta Roja): Acorn-fed back-leg and front-leg Jamón ibérico ham.
- Rashers: Cut by maestro Anselmo Pérez, the current Spain champion of ham cutting.

== Awards ==
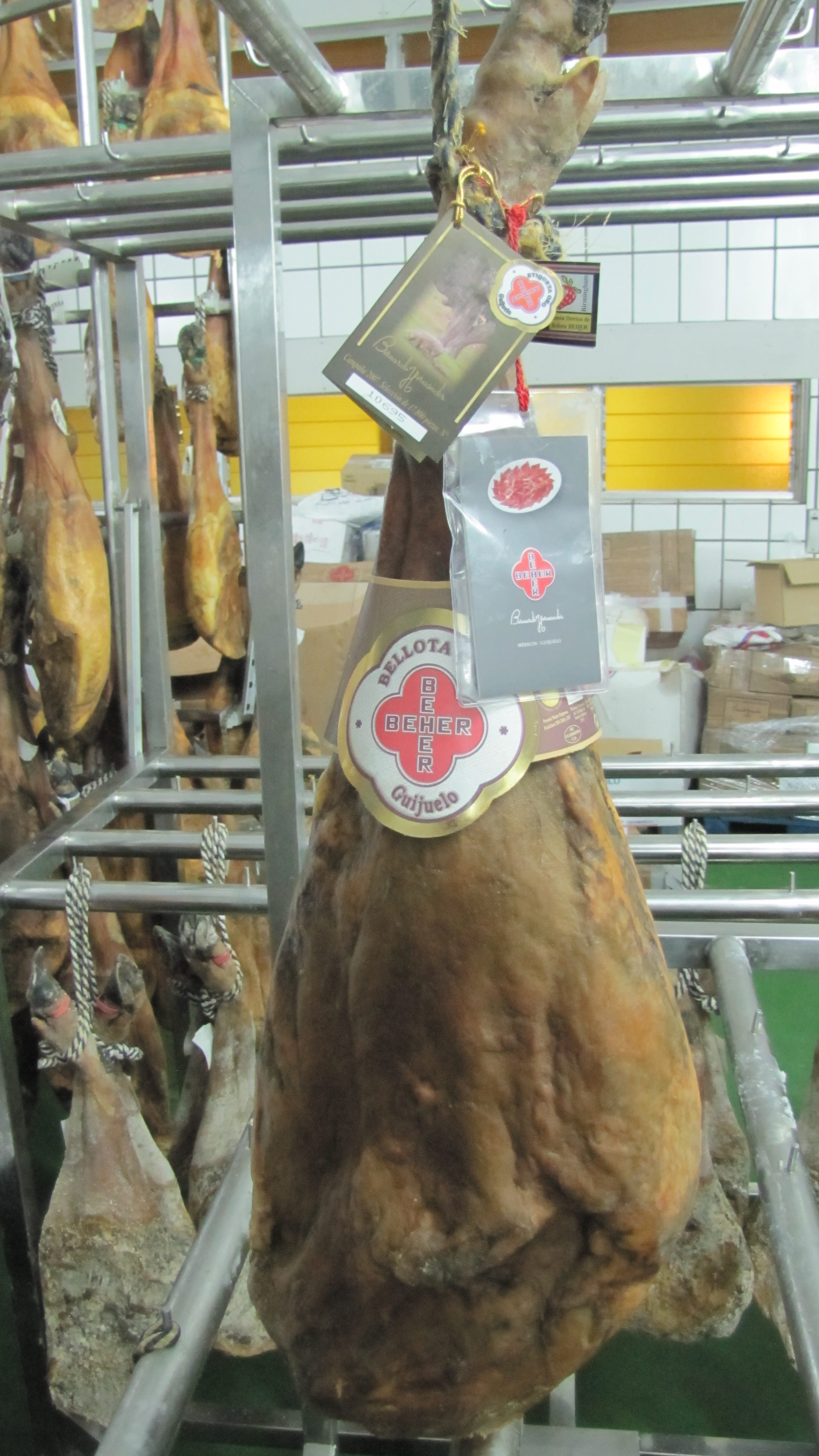
BEHER "Bellota Oro" was elected as "Best ham in the world" in IFFA Delicat 2007, 2010 and 2013

International Recognitions

- International Fair of Frankfurt – IFFA Delicat (Germany), which is the main international meat fair:
  - 1995: 5 gold medals.
  - 2001: 10 gold medals, and Honorific prize "Best foreign company".
  - 2004: 13 gold medals, and Honorific prize "Best foreign company".
  - 2007: Grand Special prize in ham category, 14 gold medals, and Prize of Honour in category of sausage products.
  - 2010: Special prize in ham category, 16 gold medals.
  - 2013: Special prize in ham category, 22 gold medals.
  - 2016: Award of Honour to The Best Company, Special International Award to The Product With The Highest Quality in the Category of Hams, 22 gold medals.
- Food & Drink Expo (Birmingham):
  - 2006: Prize for best international product.
- SUFFA (Stuttgart):
  - 2006: gold 3 medals.
- Great Taste (United Kingdom):
  - 2006: bronze medal
- Salón Nacional del Jamón SANJA (National Ham Exhibition), Teruel (Spain):
  - 2001: National award of quality of ham.
- I Feria del Jamón de Castilla y León, Segovia (Spain):
  - 2013: Prize for best "Jamón de bellota" (acorn's ham).

== See also ==
- Jamón serrano
- Spanish cuisine
- Castilian-Leonese cuisine

== Bibliography ==
- Tolosa Sola, Lluis (1998), Calidad en Ibérico, RT& A ediciones. ISBN 84-923599-0-0
