= Tierra del Vino =

Coordinates: 41°25′03″N 5°32′00″W

Tierra del Vino (literally, "the Land of Wine") is a Denominación de Origen of wine, designating wines from the provinces of Zamora and Salamanca. "Tierra del Vino" has held a Denomination of Origin since 28 April 2007, when Order AYG/782/07, dated 24, came into effect.

The region known as Tierra del Vino lies on both banks of the Duero River as it winds its way through the province of Zamora, and is crossed from North to South by the Roman Silver Road, the Vía de la Plata. It covers a total surface area of 1,799 square kilometres, which extend throughout a total of 56 boroughs; 46 in the province of Zamora and a further ten in the province of Salamanca.

== Description ==
The "Tierra del Vino" region benefits from a dry continental climate with extreme temperatures. The winters are bitterly cold and the summers dry and hot. Average temperatures do not exceed 3°C in winter but in summer reach 23°C. The region stands at an average height of around 750 m. above the sea level.

The Tierra del Vino region is crossed by many rivers, and consequently the structure of the soil is clearly alluvial. The topsoil is deep, highly permeable and with an excellent retentive capacity, although poor in organic matter.

== Wines ==
The regulations accept the following varieties for Tierra del Vino wines:

- Principal varieties: red: Tempranillo, White: Malvasía, fine grain Moscatel and Verdejo.
- Other varieties: Garnacha, Albino and Palomino
