= Tierra de Pinares =

Natural region in Castilla and León, Spain

Map of the Castilian natural region in the provinces of Segovia, Valladolid and Ávila (red)

Tierra de Pinares (Spanish: [ˈtjera ðe pi'na.ɾes]; Spanish for 'Land of Pinewoods') is a natural region located in the autonomous community of Castilla and León in Spain, and includes the north of the province of Segovia and the south of the province of Valladolid. It also extends to the east of the province of Ávila. It is a forest mass composed of the species Pinus pinaster and Pinus pinea.

== The Segovian area ==
Within the northern part of the Land of Pinewoods, corresponding to the north of the province of Segovia, is the town of Cuéllar, historically linked to forest use and woodwork, self-defined for years as a "Mudejar island in a sea of pine forests". It currently has a significant number of industries dedicated to furniture, and showcases this in contest dedicated to it, framed within the Cuéllar Fair, in which it employs 1,500 square meters for furniture and decoration, and has more than 50,000 visitors. During the twentieth century it was one of many Spanish towns dedicated to the production of resin, an industry that has been rehabilitated in the twenty-first century. The patron saint of her Community of village and land, Virgin of El Henar, was proclaimed by Pius XII in 1958 the patron saint of the resin workers of Spain, and canonically crowned in 1971 by Pablo VI.

The town of Coca also appears linked throughout history to the same forest uses, including that of resin, which is also true in recent times, as well as Navas de Oro and other adjacent towns.
