= Comarcas of Spain =

Administrative divisions of some autonomous communities in Spain

Comarca
- Also known as: Eskualde (Basque)
- Category: Comarca
- Location: Kingdom of Spain
- Found in: Autonomous communities
- Number: 83 formal, 465 total (as of 20 June 2022)
- Government: Comarcal council
- Subdivisions: Municipalities

Comarcas of Spain

In Spain, a comarca (Spanish: [koˈmaɾka]) (Note: In other languages of Spain: Catalan comarques (IPA: [kuˈmaɾkəs]), sing comarca.; Galician comarcas (IPA: [koˈmaɾkɐs]), sing. comarca.; Basque eskualdeak (IPA: [es̺kualdeak], sing. eskualde.) is a traditional informal territorial division, comprising several municipalities sharing geographical, economic or cultural traits, typically with not well defined limits. Modernly, they have been formally defined for all the autonomous communities of Spain, as territorial entities intermediate between the municipality and the province, although their status ranges from official and with administrative functions (providing common local government services) in some communities, to unofficial and based on mere preliminary studies in other communities.

In English, a comarca is equivalent to an area, county, district, or zone.

== Legally defined comarcas ==
In 1985, a law was passed permitting territorial division into comarcas by each autonomous community. Because comarcas are subdivisions created by autonomous regions and not the state, their boundaries may overlap the boundaries of provinces within their respective autonomous community, creating instances in which a comarca has territory in more than one province.

The large majority of legally defined comarcas are in Catalonia (42) and Aragon (33), and are regulated by law and are governed by a comarcal council with specified powers. There are seven comarcas formally registered in Basque Country and one, El Bierzo, in Castile and León. In Andalusia, Galicia, Valencia and Asturias, comarcas are defined by regional law but lack any specific function.

== Informal comarcas ==
In other regions, comarcas are traditional or historical or in some cases, contemporary creations designed for tourism promotions. In some other cases (e.g. La Carballeda) a comarca may correspond to a natural area, like a valley, river basin and mountainous area, or even to historical regions overlapping different provinces and ancient kingdoms (e.g. Ilercavonia).

In such comarcas or natural regions municipalities have resorted to organizing themselves in mancomunidad (commonwealth), like the Taula del Sénia, the only legal formula that has allowed those comarcas to manage their public municipal resources meaningfully.

There is also a comarca, the Cerdanya that is divided between two states, the southwestern half being counted as a comarca of Spain, while the northeastern half is part of France.

== Relationship to other groups of municipalities ==
There are also other groupings of municipalities in Spain including provinces, mancomunidades, metropolitan areas and the major islands of the Canary Islands and the Balearic Islands.

Legally defined comarcas have their boundaries and functions defined by the relevant regional government (autonomous community) and so do not necessarily have boundaries consistent with provinces which are defined by the State. The remit of comarcas is very similar to that of the provinces and has been criticised for duplication. However in Catalonia, the comarca (and not the province) has been the traditional territorial organisation.

== List of comarcas of Spain by autonomous communities ==
=== Comarcas of Andalusia ===
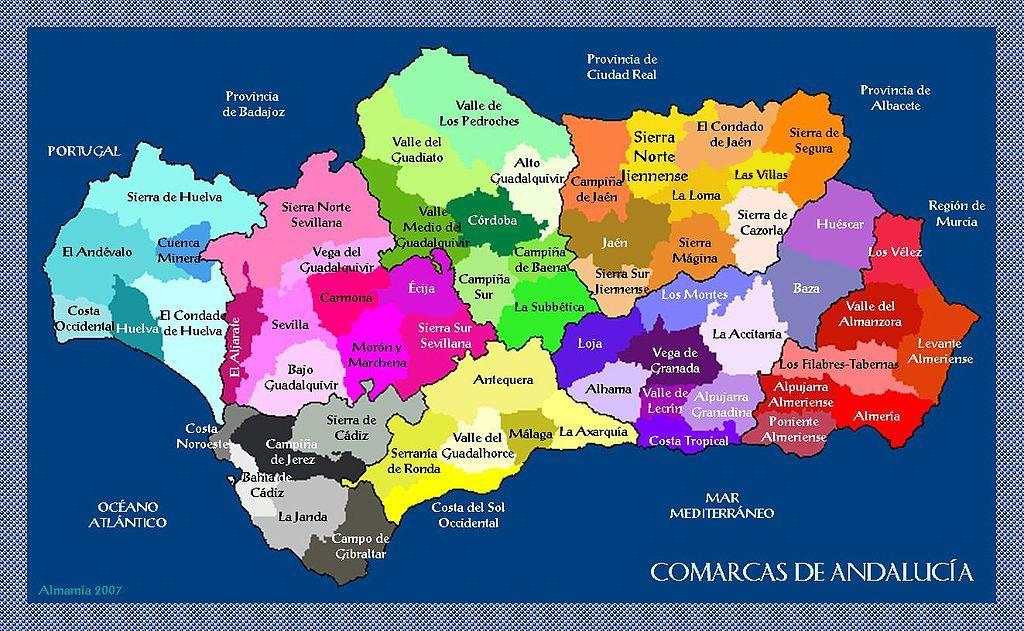
Comarcas of Andalusia

==== Comarcas of the province of Almería ====
- Alto Almanzora
- Poniente Almeriense
- Comarca Metropolitana de Almería
- Los Vélez
- Los Filabres-Tabernas
- Levante Almeriense
- Alpujarra Almeriense

==== Comarcas of the province of Cádiz ====
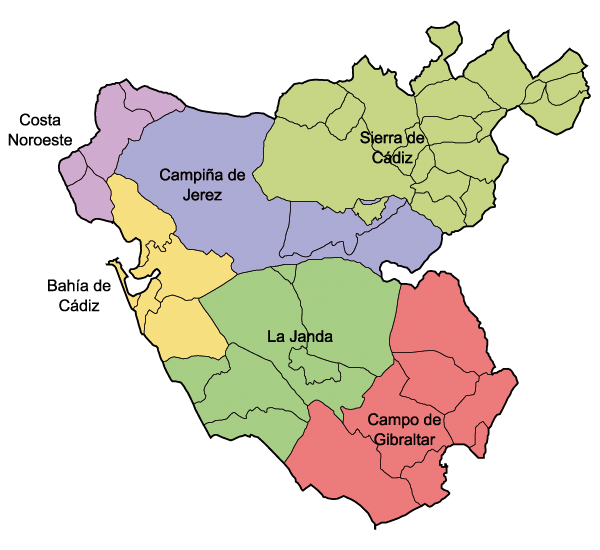
Comarcas of Cádiz

- Bahía de Cádiz
- Costa Noroeste de Cádiz
- Campo de Gibraltar
- La Janda
- Campiña de Jerez, also called Marco de Jerez
- Sierra de Cádiz

==== Comarcas of the province of Córdoba ====
- Alto Guadalquivir
- Campiña de Baena
- Campiña Sur
- Los Pedroches
- Subbetica
- Valle del Guadiato
- Valle Medio del Guadalquivir

==== Comarcas of the province of Granada ====
Comarcas of Granada

- Alpujarra Granadina
- Comarca de Alhama
- Comarca de Baza
- Comarca de Guadix
- Comarca de Huéscar
- Comarca de Loja
- Costa Granadina
- Los Montes
- Valle de Lecrín
- Vega de Granada

==== Comarcas of the province of Huelva ====
- Andévalo
- Condado de Niebla
- Cuenca Minera de Riotinto
- Costa Occidental de Huelva
- Metropolitana de Huelva
- Sierra de Aracena

==== Comarcas of the province of Jaén ====
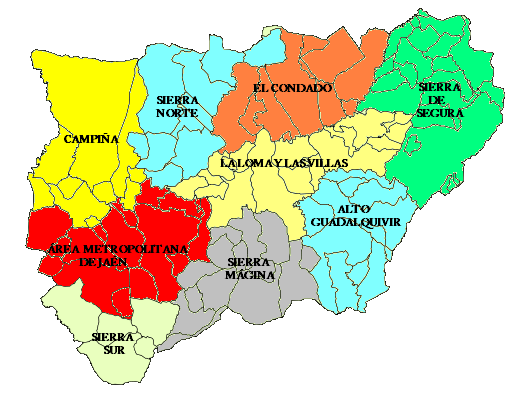
Comarcas de Jaén

- Alto Guadalquivir - Cazorla
- La Campiña
- El Condado
- Área Metropolitana de Jaén
- La Loma
- Las Villas
- Sierra Norte
- Sierra Mágina
- Sierra de Segura
- Sierra Sur de Jaén

==== Comarcas of the province of Málaga ====
- Antequera
- Axarquía (Eastern Costa del Sol)
- Costa del Sol Occidental (Western Costa del Sol)
- Guadalteba
- Málaga - Costa del Sol
- Nororiental de Málaga ("Nororma")
- Serranía de Ronda
- Sierra de las Nieves
- Valle del Guadalhorce

==== Comarcas of the province of Sevilla ====
- Aljarafe
- Bajo Guadalquivir
- Campiña
- Estepa
- Marisma
- Sierra Norte
- Sierra Sur
- La Vega

=== Comarcas of Aragon ===
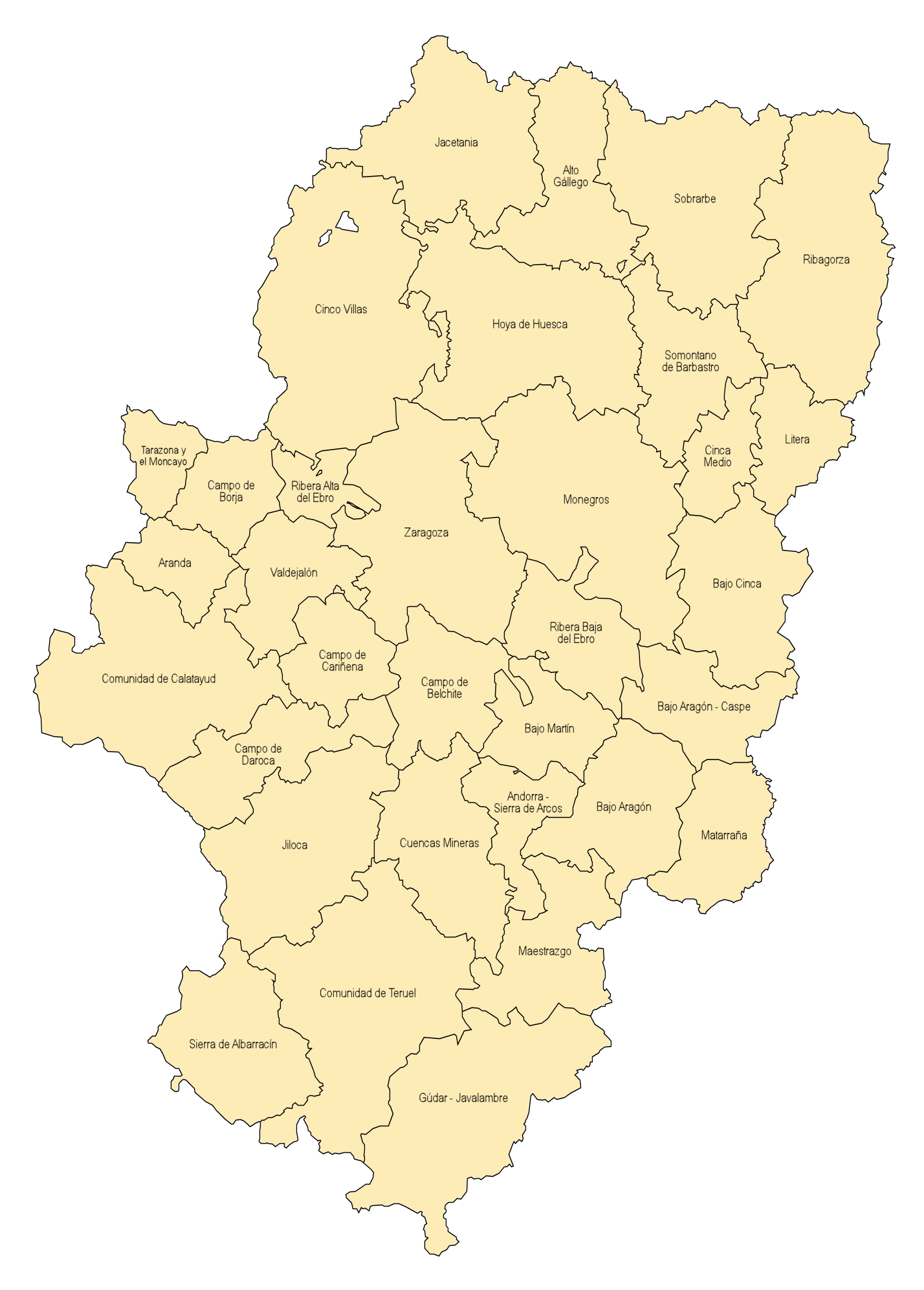
Comarcas of Aragon

==== Comarcas of the province of Huesca/Uesca ====
- Alto Gállego
- Bajo Cinca, also called Baix Cinca
- Cinca Medio
- Hoya de Huesca, also called Plana de Uesca
- Jacetania
- La Litera, also called La Llitera
- Monegros
- Ribagorza
- Sobrarbe
- Somontano de Barbastro

==== Comarcas of the province of Teruel ====
- Bajo Martín
- Jiloca
- Cuencas Mineras
- Andorra-Sierra de Arcos
- Bajo Aragón
- Comunidad de Teruel
- Maestrazgo
- Sierra de Albarracín Comarca, named after the Sierra de Albarracín mountain range
- Gúdar-Javalambre
- Matarraña (Matarranya in Catalan spelling)

==== Comarcas of the province of Zaragoza ====
- Aranda
- Bajo Aragón-Caspe, also called Baix Aragó-Casp
- Campo de Belchite
- Campo de Borja
- Campo de Cariñena
- Campo de Daroca
- Cinco Villas
- Comunidad de Calatayud
- Ribera Alta del Ebro
- Ribera Baja del Ebro
- Tarazona y el Moncayo
- Valdejalón
- Zaragoza

=== Comarcas of Asturias ===
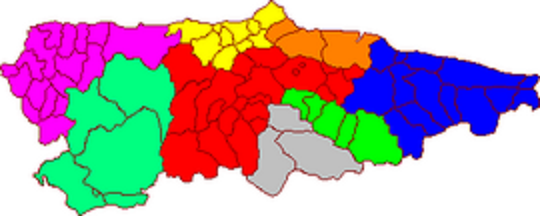
Comarcas of Asturias

- Avilés
- Caudal
- Eo-Navia
- Gijón / Xixón
- Nalón
- Narcea
- Oriente
- Oviedo / Uviéu

=== Comarques of the Balearic Islands ===
==== Mallorca ====
- Palma de Mallorca
- Serra de Tramuntana
- Es Raiguer
- Es Pla
- Migjorn
- Llevant

==== Menorca ====
- Menorca

==== Pitiüses ====
- Eivissa
- Formentera

=== Eskualdeak / Comarcas of the Basque Country ===
==== Eskualdeak / Cuadrillas of the province of Álava-Araba ====
- Añana
- Aiara / Ayala
- Llanada Alavesa / Arabako Lautada
- Vitoria-Gasteiz
- Gorbeialdea
- Arabako Mendialdea / Montaña Alavesa
- Arabako Errioxa / Rioja Alavesa

==== Eskualdeak / Comarcas of the province of Biscay ====
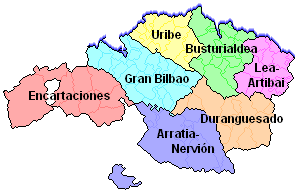
Eskualdeak of Biscay

- Arratia-Nerbioi
- Busturialdea
- Durangaldea
- Enkarterri
- Gran Bilbao
- Lea-Artibai
- Mungialdea

==== Eskualdeak / Comarcas of the province of Gipuzkoa ====
- Bidasoa-Txingudi
- Debabarrena
- Debagoiena
- Goierri
- Donostialdea
- Tolosaldea
- Urola Kosta
- Urola Erdia
- Urola Garaia

=== Comarcas of the Canary Islands ===
==== Comarcas of the province of Las Palmas ====
- Fuerteventura
- Lanzarote
- Las Palmas

==== Comarcas of the province of Tenerife ====
- El Hierro
- La Gomera
- La Palma
- Tenerife
  - Valle de Güímar
  - Valle de la Orotava
  - Icod
  - Daute Isla Baja
  - Isora-Teno
  - Tenerife Sur (Adeje-Arona)
  - Tenerife Sur (Granadilla-Arico)
  - Acentejo
  - Metropolitana-Anaga

=== Comarcas of Cantabria ===
Comarcas of Cantabria.

- Comarca de Santander
- Besaya
- Saja-Nansa
- Costa occidental
- Costa oriental
- Trasmiera
- Pas-Miera
- Asón-Agüera
- Liébana
- Campoo-Los Valles

=== Comarques of Catalonia ===
Comarques of Catalonia

==== Comarques of the province of Barcelona ====
- Alt Penedès
- Anoia
- Bages
- Baix Llobregat
- Barcelonès
- Berguedà
- Garraf
- Maresme
- Moianès
- Osona
- Vallès Occidental
- Vallès Oriental

==== Comarques of the province of Girona ====
- Alt Empordà
- Baix Empordà
- Baixa Cerdanya (partly)
- Garrotxa
- Gironès
- Osona (partly)
- Pla de l'Estany
- Ripollès
- Selva

==== Comarques of the province of Lleida ====
- Alt Urgell
- Alta Ribagorça
- Baixa Cerdanya (partly)
- Garrigues
- Noguera
- Pallars Jussà
- Pallars Sobirà
- Pla d'Urgell
- Segarra
- Segrià
- Solsonès
- Urgell
- Val d'Aran

==== Comarques of the province of Tarragona ====
- Alt Camp
- Baix Camp
- Baix Ebre
- Baix Penedès
- Conca de Barberà
- Montsià
- Priorat
- Ribera d'Ebre
- Tarragonès
- Terra Alta

=== Comarcas of Castile–La Mancha ===
==== Comarcas of the province of Albacete ====
- Llanos de Albacete
- Campos de Hellín
- La Mancha del Júcar-Centro
- La Manchuela
- Monte Ibérico-Corredor de Almansa
- Sierra de Alcaraz y Campo de Montiel
- Sierra del Segura

==== Comarcas of the province of Ciudad Real ====
- Valle de Alcudia
- Campo de Calatrava
- Mancha
- Montes
- Campo de Montiel
- Sierra Morena

==== Comarcas of the province of Cuenca ====
- Alcarria conquense.
- La Mancha de Cuenca.
- Manchuela conquense.
- Serranía Alta.
- Serranía Baja.
- Serranía Media-Campichuelo.

==== Comarcas of the province of Guadalajara ====
- Campiña de Guadalajara
- Campiña del Henares
- La Alcarria
- La Serranía
- Señorío de Molina-Alto Tajo

==== Comarcas of the province of Toledo ====
- Campo de San Juan
- La Jara
- La Campana de Oropesa
- Mancha Alta de Toledo
- Mesa de Ocaña
- Montes de Toledo
- La Sagra
- Sierra de San Vicente
- Tierras de Talavera
- Torrijos (comarca)

=== Comarcas of Castile and León ===
==== Comarcas of the province of Ávila ====
- La Moraña
- Comarca de Ávila (Valle de Amblés y Sierra de Ávila)
- Comarca de El Barco de Ávila - Piedrahíta (Alto Tormes y Valle del Corneja)
- Comarca de Burgohondo - El Tiemblo - Cebreros (Valle del Alberche y Tierra de Pinares)
- Comarca de Arenas de San Pedro

==== Comarcas of the province of Burgos ====
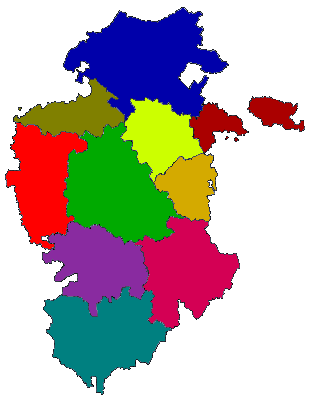
Comarcas of Burgos.

- Merindades
- Páramos
- La Bureba
- Ebro
- Odra-Pisuerga
- Alfoz de Burgos
- Montes de Oca
- Arlanza
- Sierra de la Demanda
- Ribera del Duero

==== Comarcas of the province of León ====
- La Montaña de Luna
- La Montaña de Riaño
- La Cabrera
- Astorga
- El Bierzo
- Tierras de León
- La Bañeza
- El Páramo
- Esla-Campos
- Sahagún

==== Comarcas of the province of Palencia ====
- Cerrato Palentino
- Montaña Palentina
- Páramos Valles
- Tierra de Campos

==== Comarcas of the province of Salamanca ====
Comarcas of Salamanca.

- Comarca de Vitigudino (El Abadengo, Las Arribes, Tierra de Vitigudino and La Ramajería)
- Comarca de Ciudad Rodrigo (Ciudad Rodrigo, Campo de Argañán, Campo del Yeltes, Los Agadones, Campo de Robledo and El Rebollar)
- La Armuña
- Las Villas
- Tierra de Peñaranda
- Tierra de Cantalapiedra
- Tierra de Ledesma
- Comarca de Guijuelo (Entresierras, Salvatierra and Alto Tormes)
- Tierra de Alba
- Sierra de Béjar
- Sierra de Francia
- Campo de Salamanca

==== Comarcas of the province of Segovia ====
An official classification establishes three comarcas:

- Segovia.
- Cuéllar.
- Sepúlveda.

or sometimes four:

- Tierra de Pinares (shares with the province of Valladolid).
- Segovia.
- Sepúlveda.
- Tierra de Ayllón.

However, historic approaches (before the national classification into provinces) establish six comarcas:

- Tierra de Pinares.
- Tierra de Ayllón.
- Tierras de Cantalejo y Santa María la Real de Nieva.
- Páramos del Duratón.
- Tierra de Segovia.
- Tierra de Sepúlveda.

==== Comarcas of the province of Soria ====
- Campo de Gómara
- Almarza
- Almazán
- Berlanga
- Frentes
- Pinares
- Moncayo
- El Valle y La Vega Cintora
- Las Vicarías
- Tierra de Medinaceli
- Tierras Altas
- Tierras del Burgo

==== Comarcas of the province of Valladolid ====
- Tierra de Campos
- Montes Torozos
- Páramos del Esgueva
- Tierra de Pinares
- Campo de Peñafiel
- Campiña del Pisuerga
- Tierras de Medina

==== Comarcas of the province of Zamora ====
Comarcas of Zamora.

- Alfoz de Toro.
- Aliste.
- Benavente y Los Valles.
- La Carballeda.
- La Guareña.
- Sanabria.
- Sayago.
- Tábara.
- Tierra de Alba.
- Tierra de Campos.
- Tierra del Pan.
- Tierra del Vino.

=== Comarcas of Extremadura ===
==== Comarcas of the province of Badajoz ====
- Campiña Sur (Badajoz)
- La Serena, Spain
- La Siberia
- Las Vegas Altas
- Llanos de Olivenza
- Sierra Suroeste
- Tentudía
- Tierra de Badajoz
- Tierra de Barros
- Tierra de Mérida - Vegas Bajas
- Zafra - Río Bodión

==== Comarcas of the province of Cáceres ====
- Comarca de Cáceres
- Campo Arañuelo
- La Vera
- Las Hurdes
- Las Villuercas
- Los Ibores
- Sierra de Gata (comarca)
- Tajo-Salor
- Tierra de Alcántara
- Trasierra/Tierras de Granadilla
- Tierra de Trujillo
- Valencia de Alcántara
- Valle del Ambroz
- Valle del Jerte
- Vegas del Alagón

=== Comarcas of Galicia ===
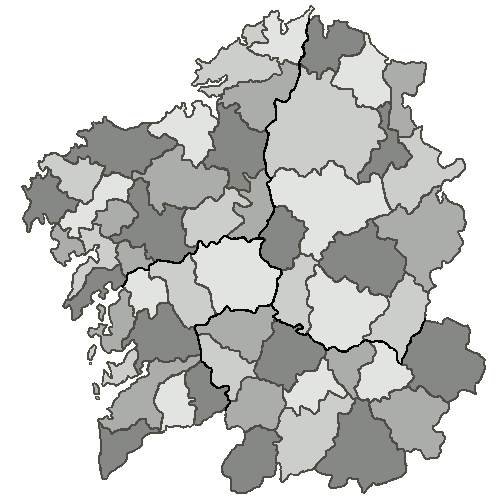
Comarcas in Galicia

==== Comarcas of the province of A Coruña ====
- A Barcala
- A Coruña
- Arzúa
- Barbanza
- Betanzos
- Bergantiños
- Eume
- Ferrol
- Fisterra
- Muros
- Noia
- O Sar
- Ordes
- Ortegal
- Santiago
- Terra de Melide
- Terra de Soneira
- Xallas

==== Comarcas of the province of Lugo ====
- A Fonsagrada
- A Mariña Central
- A Mariña Occidental
- A Mariña Oriental
- A Ulloa
- Chantada
- Lugo
- Meira
- Os Ancares
- Quiroga
- Sarria
- Terra Chá
- Terra de Lemos

==== Comarcas of the province of Ourense ====
- Allariz - Maceda
- A Baixa Limia
- O Carballiño
- A Limia
- Ourense
- O Ribeiro
- Terra de Caldelas
- Terra de Celanova
- Terra de Trives
- Valdeorras
- Verín
- Viana

==== Comarcas of the province of Pontevedra ====
- A Paradanta
- Caldas
- O Deza
- O Baixo Miño
- O Condado
- O Morrazo
- O Salnés
- Pontevedra
- Tabeirós - Terra de Montes
- Vigo

=== Comarcas of La Rioja ===
- Rioja Alta
- Rioja Baja
- Tierra de Cameros
  - Camero Nuevo (from Iregua river to West)
  - Camero Viejo (from Leza river to East)

=== Comarcas of Madrid ===
- Comarca de Alcalá or Tierra de Alcalá
- La Alcarria
- Madrid
- Corredor del Henares
- Sierra Norte
- Sierra Este
- Sierra Noroeste
- Sierra Oeste
- Madrid Sur
- Las Vegas del Tajo
- Vega del Jarama

=== Comarcas of Region of Murcia ===
Comarcas de Murcia

- Altiplano
- Alto Guadalentín
- Bajo Guadalentín
- Campo de Cartagena / Comarca de Cartagena
- Huerta de Murcia
- Región del Mar Menor / Comarca of Mar Menor
- Región del Noroeste / Comarca del Noroeste
- Región del Río Mula / Cuenca del Río Mula
- Región Oriental
- Valle de Ricote
- Vega Alta / Comarca de la Vega Alta del Segura
- Vega Media / Comarca de la Vega Media del Segura

=== Eskualdeak / Comarcas of Navarre ===
Eskualdeak/Comarcas of Navarre

- Bortziriak / Cinco Villas
- Baztan
- Tudela
- Bidasoa Garaia / Alto Bidasoa
- Sakana / Barranca
- Aralarraldea / Norte de Aralar
- Ultzamaldea
- Agoitz / Aoiz
- Irunberri / Lumbier
- Auñamendi
- Iruñerria / Cuenca de Pamplona
- Gares / Puente la Reina
- Estella Oriental
- Estella Occidental
- Zangoza / Sangüesa
- Tafalla
- Ribera del Alto Ebro
- Ribera Arga-Aragón
- Erronkari-Zaraitzu / Roncal-Salazar

=== Comarques of the Valencian Community ===
Comarcas of the Comunitat Valenciana

==== Comarques of the province of Alicante ====
- Alacantí
- Alcoià
- Alt Vinalopó
- Baix Vinalopó
- Comtat
- Marina Alta
- Marina Baixa
- Vega Baja del Segura / Baix Segura
- Vinalopó Mitjà

==== Comarques of the province of Castellón ====
- Alcalatén
- Alt Maestrat
- Alto Mijares
- Alto Palancia
- Baix Maestrat
- Plana Alta
- Plana Baixa
- Ports

==== Comarques of the province of Valencia ====
- Camp de Túria
- Camp de Morvedre
- Canal de Navarrés
- Costera
- Hoya de Buñol
- Horta
  - Horta Nord
  - Horta Oest
  - Horta Sud
  - Valencia
- Los Serranos
- Requena-Utiel
- Rincón de Ademuz
- Ribera Alta
- Ribera Baixa
- Safor
- Vall d'Albaida
- Valle de Cofrentes-Ayora

== See also ==
- Autonomous communities of Spain
- List of municipalities of Spain
- Provinces of Spain

== Bibliography ==
- "Local Government Act (Organic Law 7/1985)" (in Spanish). Agencia Estatal Boletín Oficial del Estado. 1985.
- Spanish Ministry of Economic Affairs and Digital Transformation. "Register of Local Entities". Local Entity Portal (in Spanish).
- Cools, Marc; Verbeek, Leen (19–21 March 2013). Local and regional democracy in Spain. Council of Europe.
- Albet i Mas, Abel (2019). "The municipal map in Spain: structure, evolution and problems". Geopolitica(s). Revista de estudios sobre espacio y poder (in Spanish). 10 (1): 11–40. doi:10.5209/GEOP.63834.
