= Asturians =

Ethnic group native to Asturias, Spain

Asturians (English) Asturianos (Asturian) Asturianos (Spanish)
- Flag of Asturias

Regions with significant populations
- Asturians in Asturias: 973,427 (for a total population of 1,018,706)
- Diaspora
- Argentina: 33,749
- Mexico: 22,742
- Cuba: 15,669
- Belgium: 8,208
- United States: 7,440
- Venezuela: 5,224
- France: 4,913
- Chile: 4,767
- Germany: 3,994
- Switzerland: 3,786
- Other countries: 23,362

Languages
- Asturian, Galician, Spanish

Religion
- Roman Catholicism

Related ethnic groups
- Castilians, Galicians, Leonese, Cantabrians, Extremadurans, Mirandese, Vaqueiros de alzada

Asturians are the local people of Asturias, Spain, self-identified with the historical region of the Kingdom of Asturias, in the northern coast of Spain. Asturians are native to the autonomous community of Asturias, in the North-West of the Iberian Peninsula.

== Culture and society ==
=== Heritage ===
The Asturians have Celtic (Astures) and Latin cultural origins, most notably found in the Asturian language.

=== Religion ===
Asturians' religious affiliation is predominantly Roman Catholic. The Catholic faith has historically been important to Asturians, as the Battle of Covadonga and the founding of an independent Asturian Kingdom by Pelayo were believed to have been because Pelayo prayed to a statue of the Virgin Mary in a cave before his victory in battle. Believing that Mary miraculously aided the Asturians in the battle, a shrine was set up in her honour in Covadonga.

Prior to their Christianization, Asturians followed a polytheistic Celtic religion. Many elements of this faith have survived in the form of Asturian mythological creatures and folkloric legends told today.

=== Languages ===
Throughout history, Asturian people have been subject to multiple language shifts. They originally spoke a Q-Celtic language, similar to that of the neighbouring Gallaeci people. However, due to the Roman conquest of Asturias, the language became replaced with the modern Asturian language, also known as bable, which is a Romance language. Since few records of the original Celtic language remain, it cannot be revived and has gone extinct.

The Asturian language, once also widely spoken by Asturians, has been in decline since the early 20th century, although around 40% of Asturians still speak the language (10% as a mother tongue). As Asturias is presently part of Spain, language shift toward Castilian Spanish continues to occur. Whilst not recognized as an official language in Spain, it is protected under the Autonomous Statute legislation, and efforts to preserve the language continue to be made. In the western part of Asturias, Eonavian (which is a transition language between Galician and Asturian) is also spoken, and its promotion also falls under the responsibility of Law 1/1998.

=== Cuisine ===
The most famous traditional dish is Fabada Asturiana, a rich stew made with large white beans (fabes), pork shoulder (llacón), morciella, chorizu, and saffron (azafrán). Apple groves foster the production of the traditional alcoholic drink, a natural cider (sidra). It is a very dry cider, and unlike French or English natural ciders, uses predominantly acidic apples, rather than sweet or bittersweet. Sidra is traditionally poured in by an expert server (or escanciador): the bottle is raised high above his or her head to oxygenate the brew as it moves into the glass below.

=== Music ===
The Danza Prima is the most famous Asturian dance. The most characteristic instrument is the gaita asturiana, or Asturian bagpipe. Similar bagpipes can be found in neighbouring regions such as Cantabria and Galicia.

== Emigration ==
In March 2019, it was reported that there are 133,854 Asturians living in 65 countries.

=== Americas ===
Asturians were involved in the development of the New World and their descendants in present-day Latin America, especially in Argentina and Uruguay; and other countries where Asturians moved to during the rule of the Spanish Empire. The Industrial Revolution came to Asturias after 1830 with the discovery and systematic exploitation of coal and iron resources. At the same time, there was significant migration to the Americas (i.e. Mexico, Cuba and Puerto Rico); those who succeeded overseas often returned to their native land much wealthier. These entrepreneurs were known collectively as 'Indianos', for having visited and made their fortunes in the West Indies and beyond. The heritage of these wealthy families can still be seen in Asturias today: many large 'modernista' villas are dotted across the region, as well as cultural institutions such as free schools and public libraries. Asturian communities, social clubs, sporting teams, financial banks and amateur vocal groups are still found in Mexico and Argentina as well across South America.

Tens of thousands of Asturians moved to the United States en masse, mainly to agricultural industries of Florida and California and the zinc smelters of West Virginia in the late 19th and early 20th centuries. They were also involved in working in industrial bases of Midwestern factory towns. (see Asturian-American). A characteristic of the Asturian wherever they go is their attachment to the land of their birth. This is reflected in the 82 Asturian Centers in the United States. Well-known people whose ancestors are Asturian, include Gloria Estefan, Eva Longoria, Vicente Fox, Lauren Jauregui, Miguel Díaz-Canel or Pimpinela. Martín de Argüelles was the first European to be born in the current United States.

As of 2019, there are 103,655 Asturians living in the Americas.

=== Europe ===
In the case of Europe, the largest Asturian community sits in Belgium, with 8,208 members. France, with 4,913, Germany, with 3,994, and Switzerland, with 3,786, are also traditional countries of Asturian emigration.

== Notable Asturians ==
- Pelagius of Asturias, medieval king
- Alfonso I of Asturias, medieval king
- Silo of Asturias, medieval king
- Gaspar Melchor de Jovellanos, 18th century politician
- Fernando Villaamil, 19th century navy officer
- Leopoldo Alas, 19th century writer
- Federico Romero, 20th century writer
- Indalecio Prieto, early 20th century politician
- Santiago Carrillo, 20th century politician
- Severo Ochoa, Nobel Prize in Physiology or Medicine
- Margarita Salas, scientist
- Hevia, musician
- Melendi, singer
- José Andrés, chef
- Corín Tellado, writer
- Queen Letizia of Spain
- Juan Mata, footballer
- Luis Enrique Martínez, footballer
- David Villa, footballer
- Fernando Alonso, F1 World champion
- Francisco Ángel Soriano San Martin, paralympic shooter
- Teresa Meana Suárez, feminist activist
- Belén del Valle Díaz, first female prosecutor in Spain

=== Notable people with Asturian ancestry ===
- Luis Walter Alvarez (Nobel Prize in Physics)
- Lou Piniella, American baseball player and manager
- Andrés Manuel López Obrador (President of Mexico)
- Miguel Díaz-Canel (President of Cuba)
- Cristina Fernández de Kirchner
- Aga Muhlach, Filipino actor

== See also ==
- Astures (one of the Pre-Roman peoples of the Iberian Peninsula)
- Kingdom of Asturias
- Languages of Spain
