= Meana =

Meana may refer to:

- Meyhane, a type of restaurant known as meana in the Macedonian language
- Teresa Meana Suárez (born 1952), Spanish feminist activist, teacher, and philologist
- Meana di Susa, in the province of Turin, Piedmont
- Meana Sardo, in the province of Nuoro, Sardinia
