= Juan Mata =

Spanish footballer (born 1988)

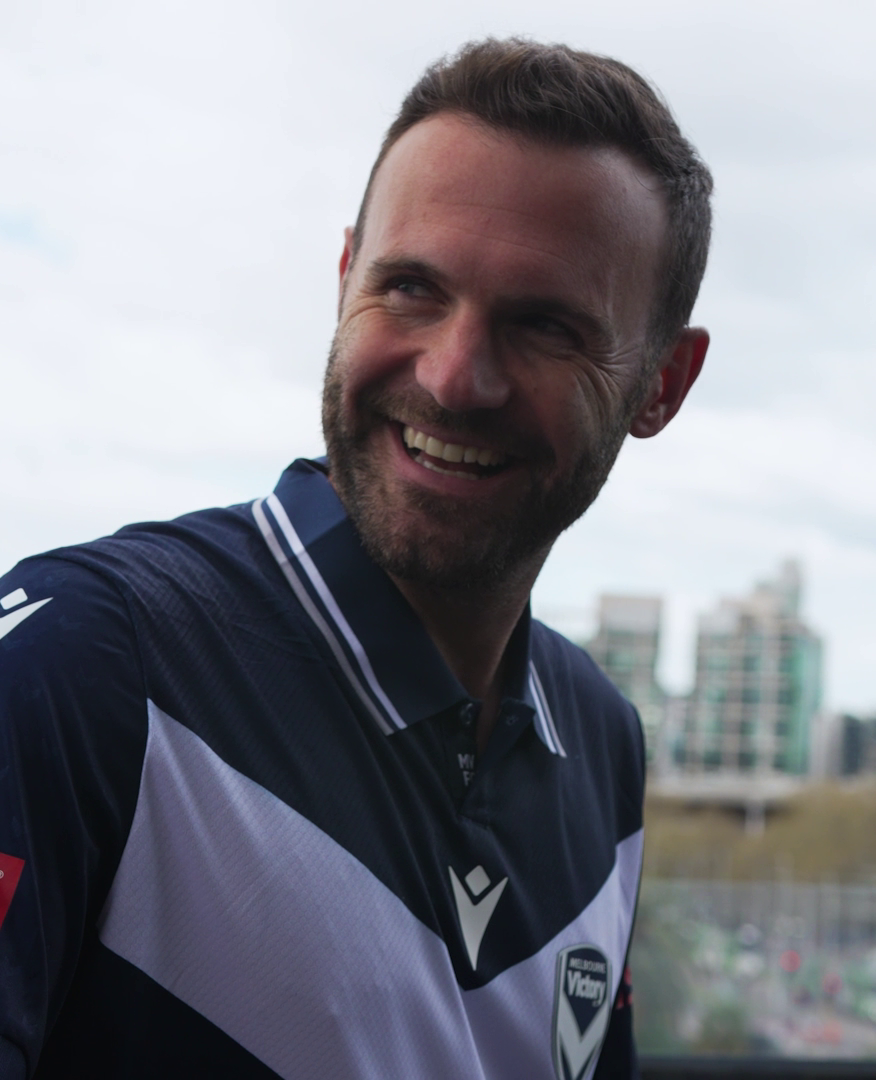
- Mata with Melbourne Victory in 2025

Personal information
- Full name: Juan Manuel Mata García
- Date of birth: 28 April 1988 (age 38)
- Place of birth: Burgos, Spain
- Height: 1.70 m (5 ft 7 in)
- Positions: Attacking midfielder; winger

Youth career
- 2000–2003: Real Oviedo
- 2003–2006: Real Madrid

Senior career*
Years	Team	Apps	(Gls)
2006–2007	Real Madrid Castilla	39	(9)
2007–2011	Valencia	129	(33)
2011–2014	Chelsea	82	(18)
2014–2022	Manchester United	196	(34)
2022–2023	Galatasaray	16	(3)
2023–2024	Vissel Kobe	1	(0)
2024–2025	Western Sydney Wanderers	22	(1)
2025–2026	Melbourne Victory	24	(5)
Total		509	(103)

International career
2004	Spain U16	3	(2)
2004	Spain U17	2	(0)
2006–2007	Spain U19	13	(12)
2007	Spain U20	5	(3)
2007–2011	Spain U21	20	(5)
2012	Spain Olympic	4	(0)
2009–2016	Spain	41	(10)
Medal record
Men's football
Representing Spain
FIFA World Cup
Winner	2010 South Africa
UEFA European Championship
Winner	2012 Poland–Ukraine
FIFA Confederations Cup
Runner-up	2013 Brazil
UEFA European Under-21 Championship
Winner	2011 Denmark
UEFA European Under-19 Championship
Winner	2006 Poland
Signature
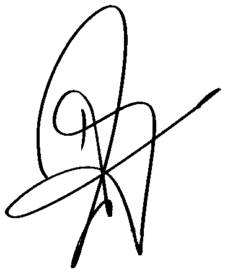
- * Club domestic league appearances and goals

Juan Manuel Mata García (Spanish: [xwan maˈnwel ˈmata ɡaɾˈθi.a]; born 28 April 1988) is a Spanish former professional footballer who played as an attacking midfielder or a winger.

A graduate of Real Madrid's youth academy, Mata played for Real Madrid Castilla in 2006–07, before joining Valencia in the summer of 2007. He became an integral part of the club's midfield, making 174 appearances over the course of four seasons and winning the Copa del Rey. In 2011, Mata signed for English club Chelsea for a fee believed to be in the region of €28 million and established himself as the team's focal player. In his first two seasons, he won the UEFA Champions League, the FA Cup, and the UEFA Europa League.

Despite Mata's stature at the club, he fell out of favour at Chelsea under newly appointed manager José Mourinho and was sold to Manchester United in January 2014, for a fee of £37.1 million. He made 285 appearances over nine seasons at United, winning the Europa League and FA Cup again as well as the EFL Cup and FA Community Shield. He joined Galatasaray after his contract with United expired in the summer of 2022, where he won the first league title of his career.

Mata debuted for Spain in 2009 and played at the 2009 FIFA Confederations Cup, his first senior tournament. In September 2009, Mata scored his first goal for the senior team, against Estonia, securing the nation a place at the 2010 FIFA World Cup, and was part of Spain's World Cup-winning squad. In 2011, he resumed playing in the under-21 side, helping Spain win the 2011 UEFA European Under-21 Championship in Denmark. He won the Golden Player award and was part of the Team of the Tournament. Mata returned to the senior squad for UEFA Euro 2012 and, after coming on as a substitute, scored Spain's fourth goal in the final as Spain defeated Italy 4–0 to retain their title as champions of Europe.

== Early life ==
Mata was born in Burgos, Castile and León. He inherited his name from his father, Juan Manuel Mata Rodríguez, who was also a footballer, playing as a forward for nearby Real Burgos in the 1980s and early 1990s. Mata was raised in his father's home town of Oviedo, Asturias. His father later acted as Mata's agent, becoming FIFA-registered in the process. In his spare time, Mata enjoys table tennis, a sport he played as a child.

== Club career ==
=== Early career ===
Mata started his football career at Real Oviedo in 2000, where his father spent part of his career, before joining Real Madrid's youth academy, La Fábrica, in 2003 at the age of 15. After appearing for their Cadete A team, he then swiftly progressed through the junior teams, Juvenil C and finally Juvenil A. In his last campaign (2005–06), he scored two goals in the league and three more in the Copa de Campeones, including the winner in the final against Real Valladolid, adding another three in the Copa del Rey Juvenil.

Switching to Real Madrid Castilla in 2006–07, Mata was given the number 34 shirt in the first team, while wearing number 28 in Castilla. In spite of Castilla's final Segunda División relegation, he finished the season as the side's second best scorer with nine, behind striker Álvaro Negredo, who registered 18.

=== Valencia ===
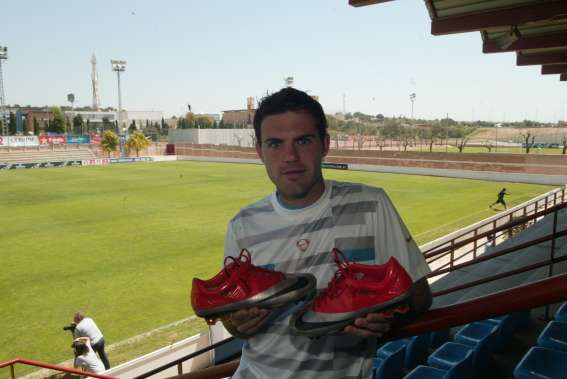
Mata at Paterna in 2009

Mata had a release clause at Real Madrid during his last season at the club, and eventually agreed to sign for fellow La Liga side Valencia in March 2007 on a contract starting on 30 June 2007.

Benefitting from the chances from Vicente's injury problems and Ronald Koeman sidelining Miguel Ángel Angulo, Mata gradually carved a niche in Valencia's first eleven. On 20 March 2008, he scored twice in the Copa del Rey semi-final match against Barcelona to help Valencia reach the final against Getafe where, on 16 April, he scored the opener in a 3–1 win. During that first season, he was voted the team's Best Young Player by fans and players alike.

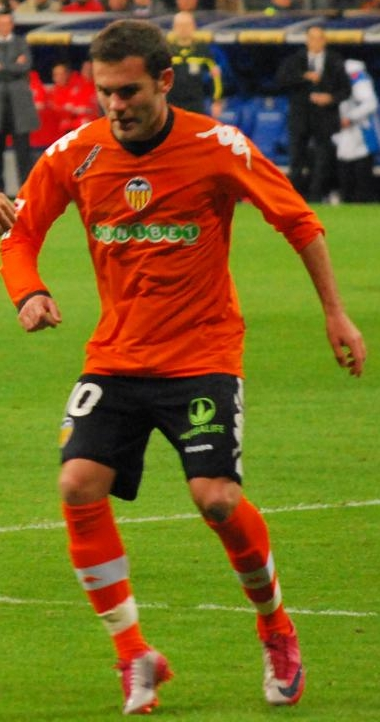
Mata playing for Valencia in 2010

In the 2008 Supercopa de España, Mata scored against his former club Real Madrid in a 3–2 first leg win, but Valencia lost 5–6 on aggregate after a 2–4 away loss in the second game. He started 2008–09 well, scoring in the opener against Mallorca in a 3–0 win. He also scored the only goal of the game against Osasuna, latching on to a long-ball from David Villa.

On 25 September 2008, Mata proved to be growing in efficiency, as he set up two of his teammate's goals in a 2–0 away win over Málaga. Three days later, he put in a superb performance against Deportivo La Coruña, scoring one and creating the other three, in a 4–2 home victory.

Towards the end of the campaign, Mata managed to score two very important late goals for Valencia: the first, the 3–2 winner at Sporting Gijón, and the second a penalty against Sevilla at home, to put Valencia 2–1 up (specialist Villa had already been replaced due to injury) in an eventual 3–1 success. He achieved impressive stats during the season, finishing with 11 successful strikes and 13 assists, behind just Barcelona's Xavi as the league's best.

In the following two seasons, Mata was an ever present offensive figure for Valencia, scoring 17 goals in 68 league games combined, with the club achieving back-to-back third-league places. On 10 April 2011, he scored two in a 5–0 home win against Valencian neighbours Villarreal. On 9 May, England-based Spanish journalist Guillem Balagué reported interest from several Premier League clubs.

=== Chelsea ===
==== Transfer ====
On 21 August 2011, Valencia announced they had agreed a £23.5 million fee for the transfer of Mata to Premier League club Chelsea, subject to a medical. On 24 August 2011, Mata signed a five-year deal with Chelsea. He revealed that compatriot Fernando Torres helped persuade him to move to Stamford Bridge, saying "Fernando got me excited about the thought of coming here. He said it would be good for me here, and that me and him together could be good. I also talked to my family and friends about it as well."

On 26 August 2011, Yossi Benayoun offered Mata his number 10 shirt, saying "I decided to give Mata the number 10 – his favourite. For me, it's just a number, not my lucky 15." (Florent Malouda wore number 15 for Chelsea at the time). Mata wore number 10 for Valencia and for Spain's under-21s in the summer, and expressed his gratitude to Benayoun. "It is a very important number to me so I'm pleased to be wearing it. I want to thank Yossi," he said. Mata followed on from Chelsea players Joe Cole, Mark Hughes, Ian Hutchinson, and Terry Venables in adopting the number 10 shirt.

==== 2011–13: European success ====
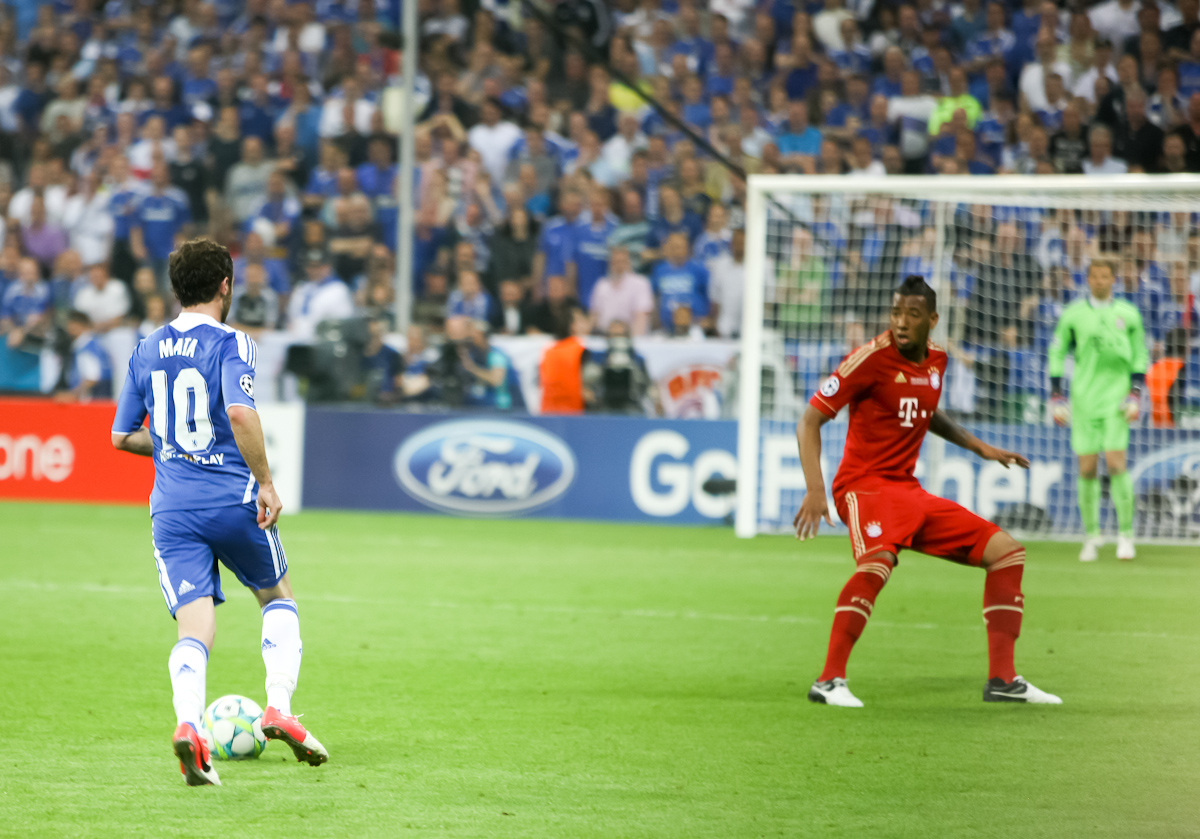
Mata taking on Bayern Munich defender Jérôme Boateng in the 2012 UEFA Champions League final

Mata made his debut for Chelsea against Norwich City on 27 August 2011, where he came on as a 68th-minute substitute for Florent Malouda and scored the club's third goal in the 11th minute of stoppage time. Chelsea went on to win the match 3–1. He started his first game for his new club in their next fixture on 10 September away to Sunderland, helping Chelsea secure a 1–2 win. On 14 September, Mata made his UEFA Champions League debut for Chelsea and scored in stoppage time to help his side defeat Bayer Leverkusen 2–0.

On 29 October 2011, Mata assisted Chelsea's 6,000th league goal with an in-swinging cross which was headed in by Frank Lampard. In the same game, Mata scored with a spectacular 25-yard strike in a 3–5 home defeat to London rivals Arsenal. On 26 November, Mata set up the first two goals which were scored by John Terry and Daniel Sturridge and also scored the third goal himself in a 3–0 win against Wolverhampton Wanderers. He was awarded the Man of the Match in a 0–3 away win at St James' Park for his performance against Newcastle United.

On 6 December 2011, during Chelsea's decisive Champions League match against former club Valencia, Mata created two assists for both of Didier Drogba goals. The game ended in a 3–0 win, which resulted in Chelsea qualifying first from their group. On Boxing Day, Mata scored his side's only goal in a 1–1 draw at Stamford Bridge against Fulham. Mata scored Chelsea's first goal of their FA Cup campaign in a 4–0 win over Portsmouth at Stamford Bridge.

In an FA Cup fourth round tie with Queens Park Rangers at Loftus Road, Mata scored his side's only goal from the penalty spot in a 0–1 victory. On 5 February 2012, Mata scored against Manchester United in a 3–3 draw. On 21 February, Mata scored his side's only goal in their 1–3 defeat away at Napoli in the first leg of the Champions League round of 16.

After the appointment of Roberto Di Matteo as interim first-team coach, Mata was played as a central attacking midfielder rather than being played on the left wing. Mata scored and had a penalty saved by Colin Doyle in the FA Cup fifth round replay against Birmingham City at St Andrew's, which Chelsea won 2–0, helping them into the quarter-finals of the FA Cup. He continued his trait of scoring in each round; this run, however, ended against Leicester City in the quarter-final, which Chelsea nonetheless won 5–2. On 7 April, Mata scored his 11th goal of the season against Wigan Athletic, giving the Blues a 2–1 victory over the Latics and kept alive Chelsea's fight for a Champions League spot.

On 15 April, in Chelsea's 5–1 win against Tottenham Hotspur in the FA Cup semi-final at Wembley Stadium, Mata scored a controversial goal and assisted Ramires and Florent Malouda for their goals, adding to his statistics in the 2011–12 FA Cup with four goals and three assists. Mata started in both legs of Chelsea's Champions League semi-final clash with reigning champions FC Barcelona, helping his side to an unexpected 3–2 win on aggregate. and set up a final clash with Bayern Munich on 19 May.

Mata provided two assists to fellow Spaniard Fernando Torres in the 6–1 thrashing of West London rivals Queens Park Rangers on 29 April, bringing his tally to 13 Premier League assists on the season. Mata assisted the first goal in the FA Cup final, which Ramires scored, as Chelsea beat Liverpool 2–1 at Wembley, with Mata picking up the Man of the Match award. On 10 May, Mata was rewarded for his consistent form throughout his first Chelsea season by the fans voting him the club's Player of the Year, following on from Chelsea legends such as Dennis Wise and Gianfranco Zola, whom he had been compared to on various occasions.

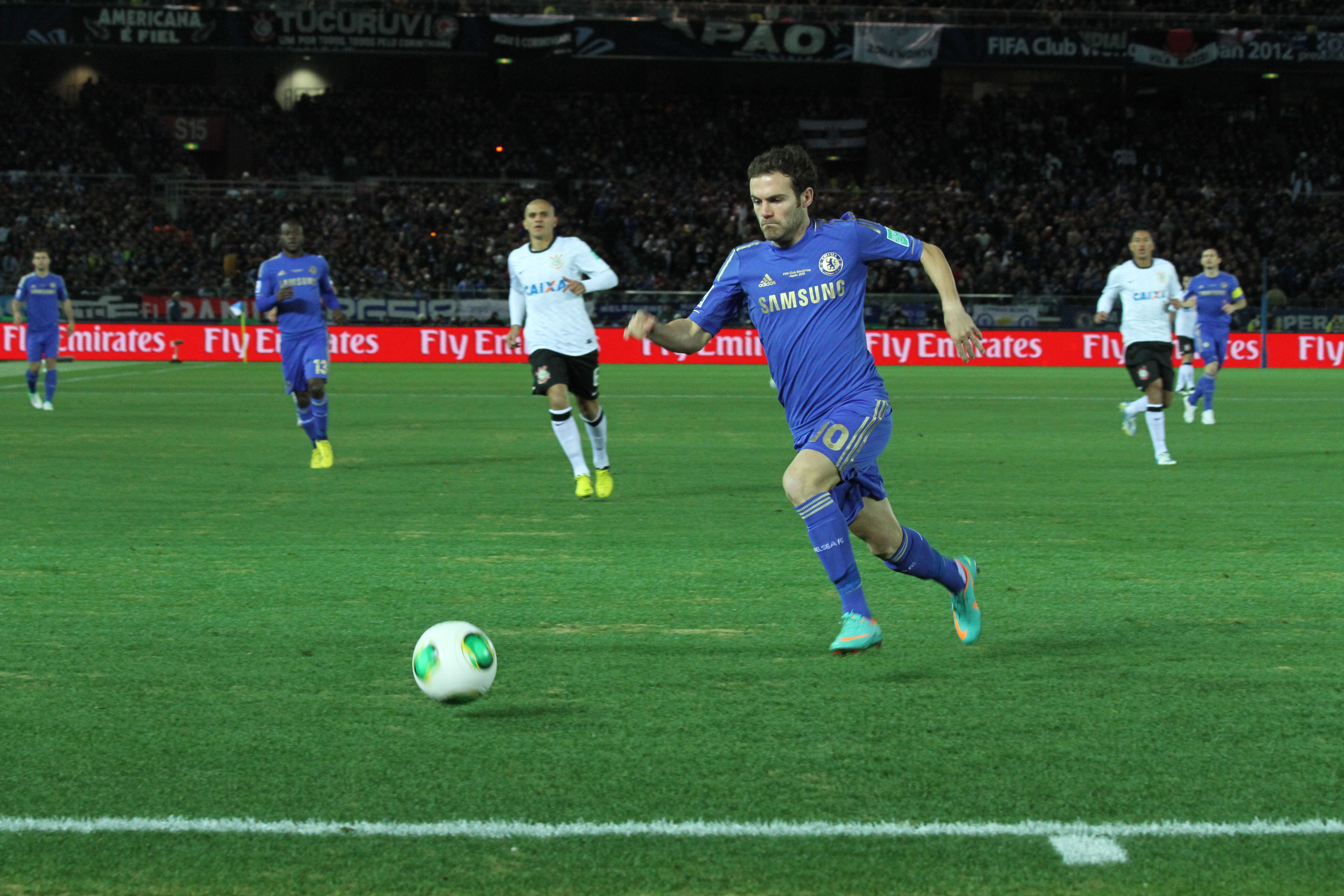
Mata during the 2012 FIFA Club World Cup final

In the 2012 UEFA Champions League final against Bayern Munich on 19 May, Mata assisted Didier Drogba's headed equaliser from a corner kick in the 88th minute. The match went on to extra time and penalties, with Mata taking Chelsea's first, which Bayern goalkeeper Manuel Neuer saved. Chelsea, however, went on to win 4–3 in the penalty-shootout, lifting their first Champions League title. Mata finished his first season at Stamford Bridge with 573 passes, creating 66 chances and completing 61 successful crosses, which all contributed to Chelsea's cup-double winning season. He finished the Premier League season with 14 assists – second highest in the league after Manchester City's David Silva – and six goals.

Mata missed all of Chelsea's pre-season games as he was playing for Spain at the 2012 Summer Olympics in London, but he returned to play in the 2012 FA Community Shield against Manchester City and was substituted after 74 minutes for Daniel Sturridge. Mata assisted his first goal of the season on 22 September 2012 against Stoke City, providing a great flick to Ashley Cole, which turned out to be the winning goal as Chelsea won 1–0. He scored his first goal of the season in the 2012–13 Football League Cup third round against Wolverhampton Wanderers, with the game finishing 6–0 to Chelsea. Four days later, he scored his first Premier League goal of the season, assisting Fernando Torres for the opener and then scoring directly from a free-kick in a 2–1 away win against Arsenal at the Emirates Stadium.

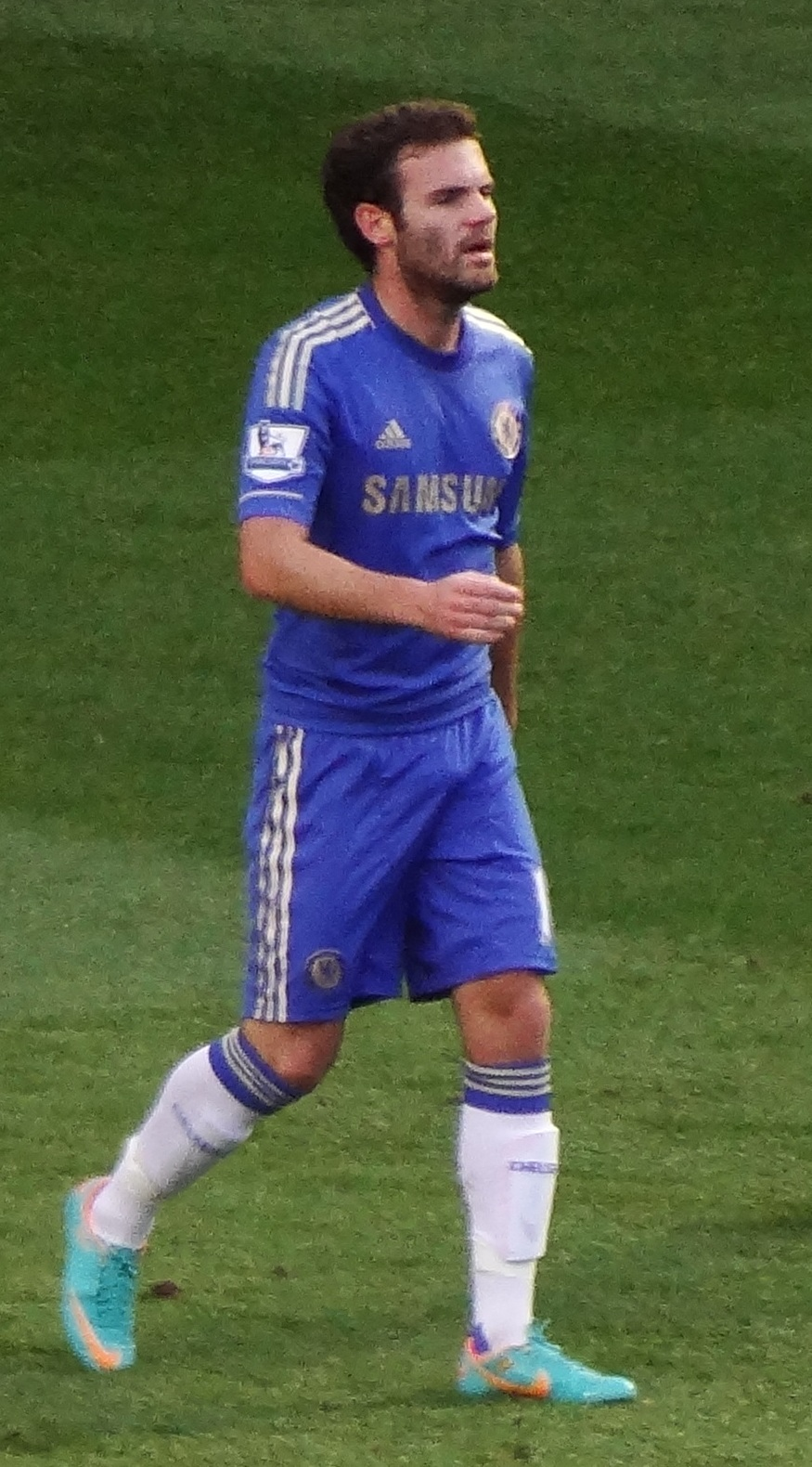
Mata playing for Chelsea in 2012

Mata scored Chelsea's first and third goal in the Champions League as Chelsea beat Nordsjælland 0–4 away in Farum, Denmark. He later provided two assists in Chelsea's 4–1 rout of Norwich City, sending Eden Hazard through on goal and later flicking a delightful ball for defender Branislav Ivanović to volley in. In a London Derby game against Tottenham Hotspur at White Hart Lane on 20 October, Mata scored twice and provided an assist for Daniel Sturridge in a 2–4 victory for Chelsea, where he also earned Man of the Match honours. He next scored in a Premier League match with a beautiful free kick against Manchester United. Chelsea, however, lost the match 3–2 after a late controversial goal from Javier Hernández. Mata went on to win the Premier League Player of the Month award for October after scoring three league goals.

After manager Roberto Di Matteo was sacked following a 3–0 defeat to Juventus in the Champions League, Mata scored the first goal of new, interim manager Rafael Benítez's reign at Chelsea against West Ham United, although Chelsea suffered a 3–1 defeat in this game. He scored again in Chelsea's win over Nordsjælland in a Champions League game, but Chelsea still failed to advance to the knockouts despite a 6–1 win at home. He added to his tally of goals and his collection of fine performance at Sunderland in a 1–3 Chelsea win. After this game, Chelsea traveled to Japan for the 2012 FIFA Club World Cup. Here, too, Mata continued his top form by scoring Chelsea's first goal in the tournament against Monterrey in the semi-final, helping them on their course to the final with a 1–3 victory. The tournament, however, ended in disappointment as Chelsea were beaten 1–0 by Brazilian club Corinthians in the final. The team put the defeat behind them by completing an 8–0 routing of Aston Villa, a game in which though Mata did not score a goal, but nevertheless played a very influential part.

On 22 December 2012, Mata signed a contract extension with Chelsea which tied him up with the club until 2018. On Boxing Day, Chelsea traveled to Carrow Road to face Norwich City, where both Manchester United and Arsenal had suffered defeats earlier in the season. Mata scored a brilliant goal in the 38th minute, taking a pass from Oscar into his stride and launching an unstoppable shot into the goal from 25 yards out. The goal turned out to be the winner. Then, on 5 January, Mata provided assists for new acquisition Demba Ba and Branislav Ivanović to help Chelsea win 1–5 against Southampton in the third round of the 2012–13 FA Cup. A week later, he forced an own goal from Jonathan Walters by putting in a tight corner and earned a penalty which Frank Lampard converted. Chelsea went on to win the game 0–4, which was Stoke's first home defeat of the season. Mata scored his eighth goal of the season in the Premier League against Arsenal in a 2–1 home win.

On 3 March 2013, Mata made his 100th appearance in all competitions for Chelsea in a 1–0 win over West Bromwich Albion at Stamford Bridge. On 14 March, Mata scored an opening goal in Chelsea's Europa League 3–1 (3–2) win against Steaua București. On 19 April, Mata was nominated for PFA Players' Player of the Year in recognition of his contribution to Chelsea's season in all competitions. The PFA's decision was based on his "ability to not only create goals but also score them himself" and saw him nominated alongside teammate Eden Hazard. He also scored an 87th-minute winner against Manchester United, a crucial one for Chelsea's Champions League qualification hopes.

On 15 May, Mata gave a fine performance in the 2013 UEFA Europa League Final against Portugal's Benfica, assisting Branislav Ivanović's injury time winner from a corner kick. The next day, he was awarded Chelsea's Player's Player of the Year award. He modestly gave the credit to the whole of the squad, saying that, "he felt proud to play for Chelsea," and thanked his teammates. He was also awarded Chelsea's Player of the Year for the second successive season. On winning his second award of the night, he said, "I feel so happy. It's my second season here and winning the trophy two years in a row is amazing for me. I just want to say thank you to all the supporters and all my teammates."

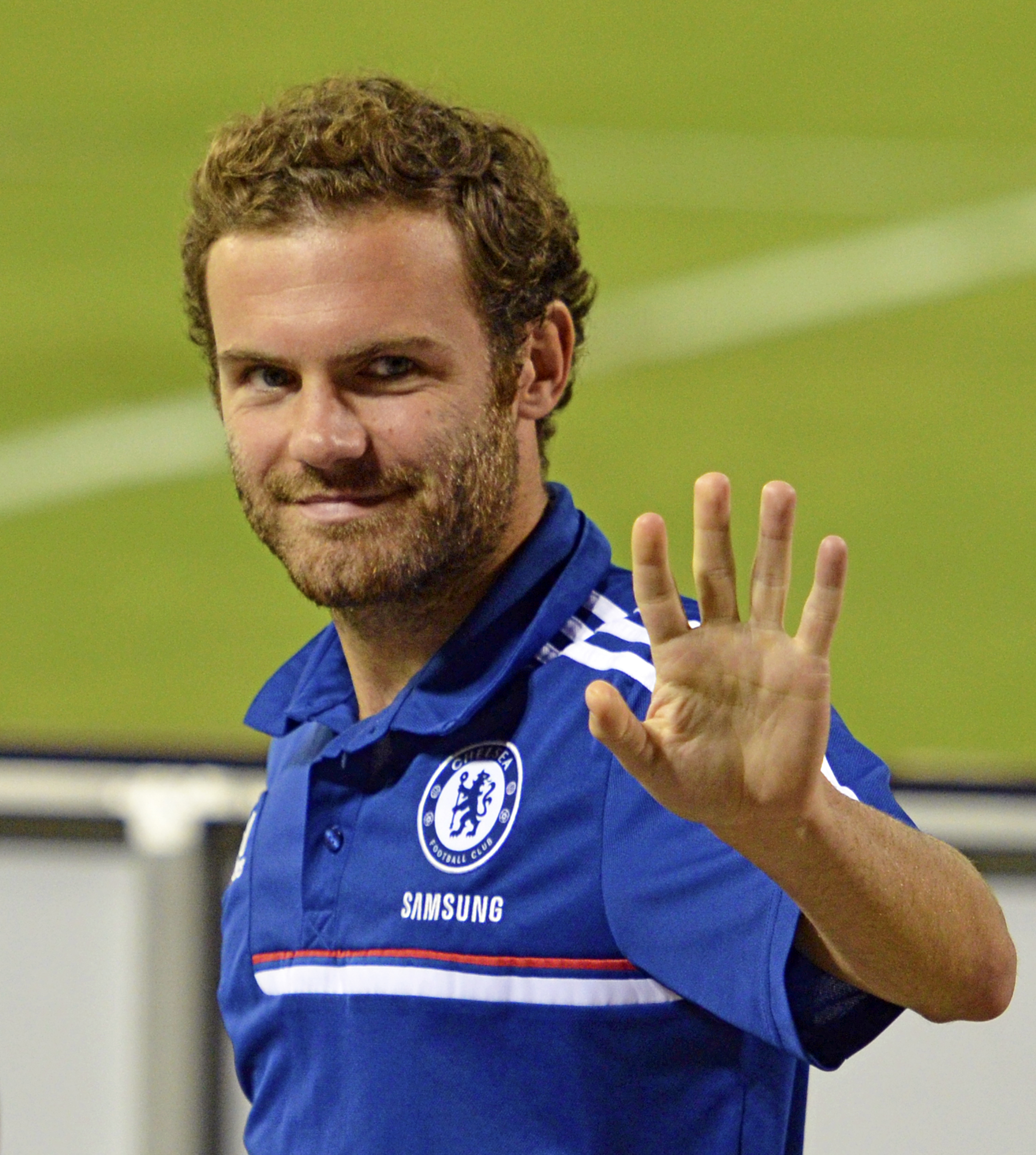
Mata on tour with Chelsea in 2013

==== 2013–14: Mid-season departure ====
Under new Chelsea manager José Mourinho, Mata spent a lot of time on the bench. Mourinho preferred Oscar as a playmaker, and suggested Mata needed to adapt to a wider position and to work harder defensively. On 28 September 2013, Mata came on as a half-time substitute against Tottenham Hotspur to assist John Terry to score an equaliser in a 1–1 draw, but his appearances in the first team remained infrequent. On 29 October, he scored his first goal of the season in a 2–0 League Cup victory at London rivals Arsenal.

Mata struggled to secure a regular first-team place under Mourinho as he had started just 11 of Chelsea's 22 Premier League matches. Mata scored 33 goals and provided 58 assists in 135 appearances over two and a half seasons with Chelsea.

=== Manchester United ===
==== Transfer ====
On 24 January 2014, Mourinho said Chelsea had accepted a transfer offer from Manchester United and he allowed Mata to travel to Manchester to undergo a medical, after the player said he was "really happy to go". Manchester United confirmed later in the day that a transfer fee had been agreed, but that the deal was still contingent on Mata agreeing personal terms and passing a medical. The transfer was completed the following day, with Manchester United paying Chelsea a then club record fee of £37.1 million (€46 million), with Mata signing a contract until the summer of 2018.

==== 2014–15: Debut season and individual success ====
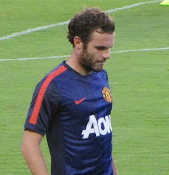
Mata during a training session with Manchester United in 2014

He made his debut against Cardiff City on 28 January and provided one assist in the 2–0 home victory. Mata scored his first goal for United in a 4–1 win over Aston Villa on 29 March 2014. He also went on to score two goals against Newcastle United in a 4–0 away victory, two more against Norwich City after coming off the bench in another 4–0 win, and the only goal in a 1–1 draw against Southampton in the final match of the season.

Mata ended the season having scored six goals for Manchester United, all in the Premier League, since he was cup tied to Chelsea in other competitions.

Mata began the new season in fine form. He scored the only goal in Manchester United's second game of the Premier League season, a 1–1 draw against Sunderland at Stadium of Light, following it up with a goal against Queens Park Rangers in a 4–0 thumping, which was also Louis van Gaal's first competitive win in charge of United. He was later dropped to the bench for the following two matches, making cameo appearances against Leicester City and West Ham United, with van Gaal preferring an attacking trinity of Wayne Rooney, Robin van Persie and new signing Radamel Falcao in both games.

Following Rooney's sending off and suspension due to a foul on Stewart Downing in the match against West Ham, Mata was reinstated to the starting lineup, and he started the next match against Everton, a 2–1 win at Old Trafford in which he provided the assist for new signing Ángel Di María's goal. Mata later scored winning goals in home games against Crystal Palace and Stoke City, the former after coming on as a second-half substitute. He made his return to the starting line-ups for the first time, in a 3–0 win over Tottenham Hotspur but was substituted in the 77th minute for Andreas Pereira. On 22 March 2015, Mata scored a brace, including a bicycle kick, in a 2–1 victory over Liverpool, a performance which he rated as his best for Manchester United. Mata's performance at Anfield led to the Old Trafford faithful coining the term 'Juanfield'. His second goal against Liverpool was also voted as Premier League Goal of the Month in March 2015. His inspired performances led to him being named as Manchester United's Player of the Month for March.

==== 2015–16: FA Cup win ====
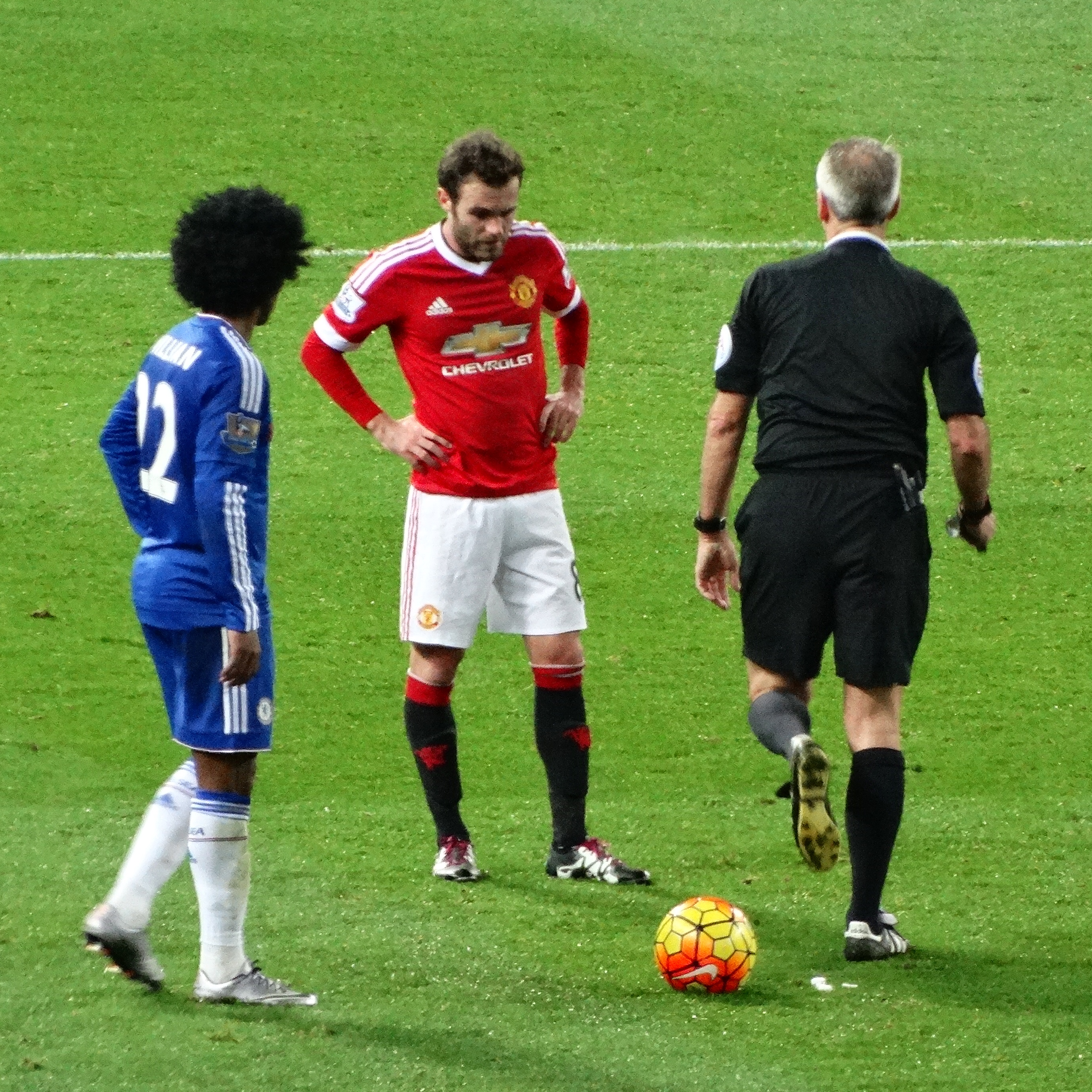
Mata (centre) preparing to take a free-kick against Chelsea in 2015

Mata, just as he had in the previous campaign, had a fine start to the season, getting an assist in the second game of the campaign against Aston Villa, which helped maintain his side's impressive record at Villa Park. September was a month to remember for Mata as he scored two goals and made two assists in just three games, as Manchester United claimed wins against Liverpool, Southampton, and Sunderland. As a result, Mata was crowned the club's Player of The Month.

Mata was made captain for the home game against Watford on 2 March and scored a free kick, which was also the match-winner. On 6 March, in a 1–0 defeat to West Brom, Mata received his first career red card after obtaining two yellow cards in the space of three minutes. Mata assisted an Anthony Martial goal against West Ham in the final game at the Boleyn Ground; however, United lost 3–2, ending their chances of beating Manchester City for fourth-place.

On 21 May 2016, Mata scored for United in the FA Cup final against Crystal Palace, leveling the score at 1–1 just three minutes after Jason Puncheon's 78th-minute goal. Mata was substituted in the 90th minute and replaced by Jesse Lingard, who would score the winning goal for United in extra time.

==== 2016–17: UEFA Europa League, League Cup wins ====
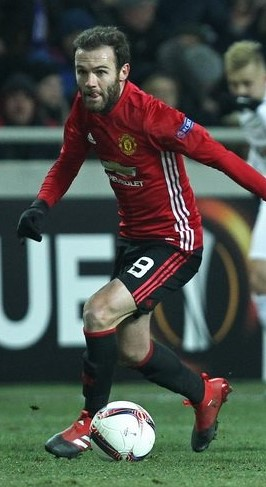
Mata during Manchester United's victorious 2016–17 UEFA Europa League campaign

At the beginning of the summer, Mata was reunited with his former Chelsea manager and the person who sold him to Manchester United, José Mourinho. On 7 August 2016, Mata was selected to be on the bench in the FA Community Shield. Mata replaced Jesse Lingard in the second half, then was substituted in added time for Henrikh Mkhitaryan. Although there were reports about tensions between the player and manager, after the match, Mata stated that there were no tensions between him and Mourinho. He started in the opening match of the season against AFC Bournemouth and scored Manchester United's first Premier League goal of the season with a tap-in after Simon Francis' error. After José Mourinho dropped captain Wayne Rooney, Mata served as the stand-in captain in the 0–0 draw against Burnley on 29 October 2016.

==== 2017–20: Later years and contract extension ====
Mata scored his third brace of his Manchester United career, scoring both goals in a Boxing Day fixture against Leicester City. However, his efforts were cancelled out by a late equaliser from Harry Maguire which saw the match finish 2–2. Mata finished the season with three goals in 40 appearances for the Red Devils, as United finished second in the Premier League and lost in the 2018 FA Cup final against his former club, Chelsea.

On 6 October 2018, Mata scored United's first goal in a 3–2 comeback win over Newcastle United. On 7 November, Mata scored the equaliser from a free kick in another late comeback 2–1 win over Juventus in a Champions League group stage fixture. Mata also scored in a 4–1 win over Fulham on 8 December, before scoring his final goal of the season in a 1–1 draw against his former club Chelsea on 28 April 2019.

On 19 June 2019, it was confirmed that Mata had signed a new two-year contract with Manchester United, keeping him at the club until June 2021 with the option of a further year. This ended months of speculation over his future.

Mata's first goal of the 2019–20 season came from the spot in 4–0 win over AZ in United's final Europa League group stage game. Mata later scored the only goal in January in an FA Cup third round replay against Wolverhampton Wanderers. Mata then scored in United's final game before the temporary suspension of football due to the COVID-19 pandemic in a 5–0 victory over LASK.

==== 2020–21 season ====
After scoring against Luton Town and Brighton and Hove Albion in the third and fourth round of the EFL Cup respectively, Mata received praise for his performance in a comeback 4–1 win against Newcastle United in the Premier League on 17 October 2020. Whilst not scoring he provided an assist for Harry Maguire's equaliser as well as being involved in the build up for all other goals. Manager Ole Gunnar Solskjær described his game as "fantastic" while Sky Sports said United's win was "largely thanks to [Solskjær's] decision to turn to Mata". On 23 May 2021, he scored his only Premier League goal of the season, a penalty in a 2–1 away win over Wolverhampton Wanderers.

==== 2021–22 season ====
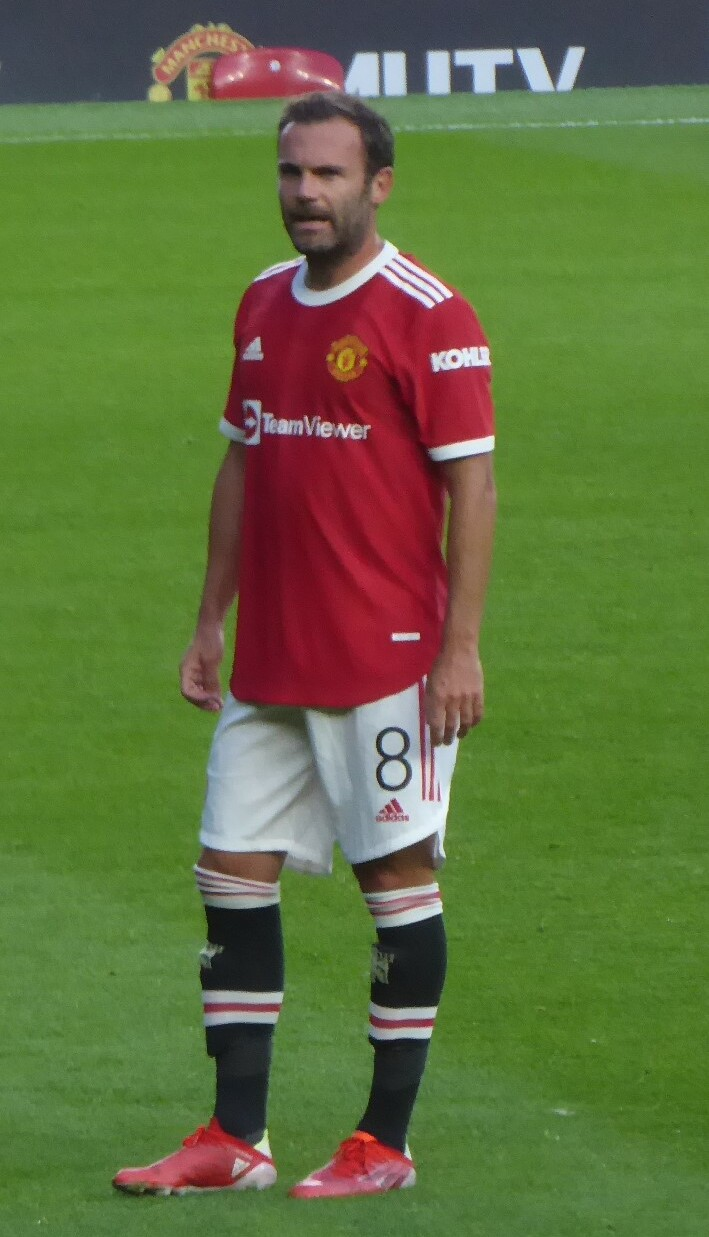
Mata playing for Manchester United in 2021

On 2 July 2021, Mata signed a contract extension with Manchester United, keeping him at the club for another year. After having made twelve appearances throughout the whole 2021–22 campaign, the last of which was during the team's last league fixture against Crystal Palace (on 22 May 2022), Mata left the club at the end of the season following his contract expiration. His time at Old Trafford came to an end after eight years, a total amount of 285 appearances and 51 goals and four trophies won with the club.

=== Galatasaray ===
On 8 September 2022, Mata signed a one-year contract with Turkish Süper Lig team Galatasaray as a free agent, with the option to extend the deal by a further year. He made his debut on 24 September, in a friendly match against Istanbulspor and showed an impressive performance. He scored his first Süper Lig goal on 28 October after coming on as a second-half substitute against Fatih Karagümrük. Mata won the 2022–23 title, with a 4–1 away win against Ankaragücü on 30 May 2023 securing the title two weeks before the end of the season, the 23rd championship in club history. On 1 July 2023, it was announced that he left Galatasaray, and a farewell message was published.

=== Vissel Kobe ===
On 3 September 2023, J1 League club Vissel Kobe announced the signing of Mata, handing him the club's number 64 shirt. Mata made just one appearance for the club, coming on as a substitute for the final ten minutes of a 2–0 away loss to Sanfrecce Hiroshima on 16 September; however, he still received a medal as Vissel Kobe were crowned J1 League champions that season. On 6 January 2024, Mata's contract with Vissel Kobe expired and he left the club.

=== Western Sydney Wanderers ===
On 5 September 2024, Mata joined Australian club Western Sydney Wanderers ahead of the new A-League Men season. He scored his first goal for the club on 1 January 2025 in a 2–3 loss to Macarthur FC. He would only feature for 599 minutes during the season, due to a falling out with head coach Alen Stajcic.

=== Melbourne Victory ===
On 16 September 2025, Mata joined A-League side Melbourne Victory for the 2025–26 season. He scored five goals and provided 13 assists in his debut season, earning the Johnny Warren Medal as the A-League Player of the Year. He was also selected in the PFA A-League Team of the Season.

On 11 September 2026, Mata departed the club following the conclusion of his contract. Having already become a stakeholder in the club, Mata also took up a position as chair of Victory's newly established football committee, while considering the next steps in his career from his home in Europe.

On 18 November 2026, Mata announced his retirement from professional football.

== International career ==
=== Youth ===
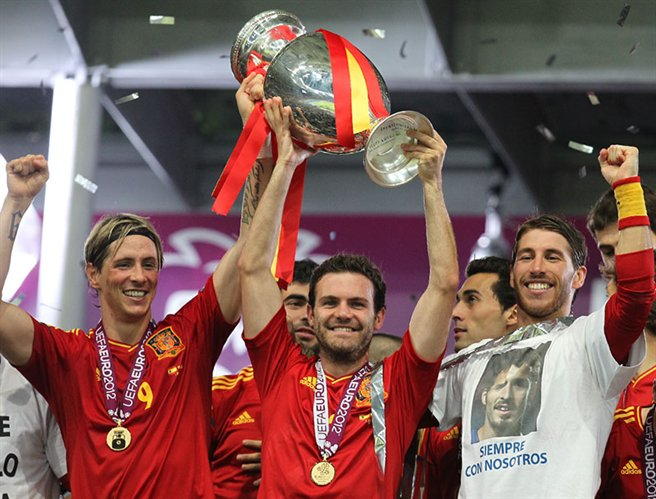
Mata celebrating with Fernando Torres (left) and Sergio Ramos (right) after winning UEFA Euro 2012

Mata represented Spain from 2004 to 2016 at under-16, under-17, under-19, under-20, under-21, Olympic and senior levels.

He was a key player for Spain as they won the 2006 UEFA European Under-19 Championship, finishing the tournament as second top scorer to his teammate Alberto Bueno, with four goals in five matches.

On 1 February 2007, Spain under-21 coach Iñaki Sáez included Mata in his squad for a friendly match against England. On 6 February, at the age of 18 years and 10 months, Mata made his under-21 debut as a substitute for Pedro León in the 61st minute of a 2–2 draw at Pride Park.

In 2011, Mata was a member of Spain's 2011 UEFA European Under-21 Championship winning team. He was included in UEFA's Team of the Tournament and named as the tournament's Golden Player.

=== Spain Olympic team ===
Mata was included in Spain's squad for the 2012 Olympic football tournament as one of their three designated overage players. Spain, however, failed to score in any of their opening three matches and were eliminated at the group stage.

=== Senior ===
On 14 November 2008, Vicente del Bosque called Mata up to the Spain senior squad ahead of a friendly match against Chile. On 28 March 2009, he made his senior international debut, coming on as a substitute for Valencia teammate David Villa in the 63rd minute of a FIFA World Cup qualifier against Turkey.

In June 2009, Del Bosque included Mata in his 23-man squad for the 2009 FIFA Confederations Cup. He started in the second group match against Iraq and came on as a substitute for Albert Riera in the semi-final loss to the United States.

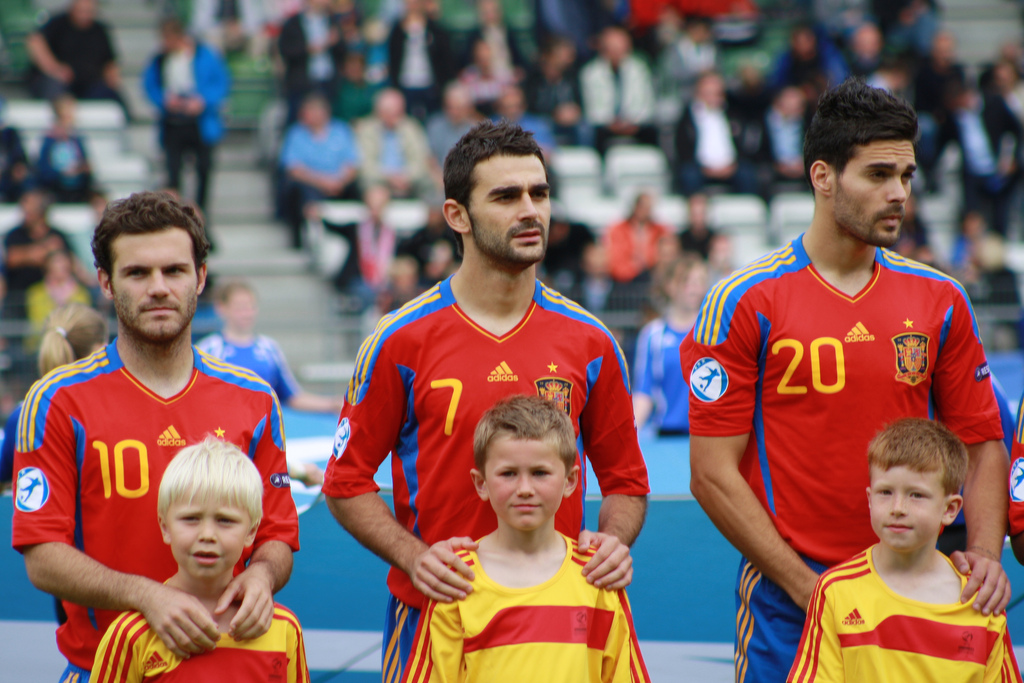
Mata, Adrián López and Alberto Botía lining up for Spain U21 in 2011

On 9 September 2009, Mata scored his first goal for the senior team in a 3–0 win against Estonia that guaranteed Spain's qualification for the 2010 FIFA World Cup in South Africa. He followed this up with the winner against Armenia on 10 October, scoring a penalty kick in a 2–1 win. Mata was selected in Spain's 23-man squad for the World Cup finals and appeared once for the eventual champions, replacing Fernando Torres for the final 20 minutes of the 2–0 group stage win against Honduras.

Mata was named in the Spain squad for UEFA Euro 2012 and, after coming on as a substitute, scored Spain's fourth goal in the final as Spain defeated Italy 4–0 to retain their title as champions of Europe.

In June 2013, he was named in Spain's squad for the 2013 FIFA Confederations Cup where he played in four of the team's five matches, scoring in the 10–0 group stage win over Tahiti. He played 52 minutes of the final before being substituted for Jesús Navas as Spain lost 3–0 to Brazil at the Estadio do Maracanã.

Mata was included in the Spanish squad for the 2014 FIFA World Cup, playing 36 minutes in the final group match against Australia where he scored the team's final goal of a 3–0 win.

== Style of play ==
For me good football is not about how many skills you show or how many players you beat. It's about making the right decision every time you have the ball. I see players that make 100% right decisions – Iniesta and Xavi – but there are also good English examples. Scholes, Lampard and Gerrard made many more right decisions than wrong decisions. You see so many players with physical qualities. They are quick and strong but they don't make the right decisions. So for me the most important thing is to do what the game asks from you in the moment. You naturally know what is right which is why, even though you have to think about defensive duties and structure, once you're on the pitch you have to be free in your mind."

— Juan Mata.

In addition to his favoured playmaking role as an attacking midfielder behind the strikers, Mata is also comfortable playing on either wing, often drifting inside to operate in the "hole" and act as a secondary string-puller. He has also been used as a second striker on occasion. He makes up for a lack of pace with his control, technique, passing, creativity, and vision, which allows him to link-up with teammates and register many assists, in addition to scoring goals. His ability to read the game and adapt to different tactical systems, whether facing a deep defensive block or an open match, makes him a key facilitator in transitional play.

A diminutive player, standing at 5 ft 7 in (1.70 m), he lacks significant physical strength, heading ability, or aerial prowess, but is quick, agile, and nimble in his movements. He possesses excellent spatial awareness, constantly moving to create passing lanes and opening up space for overlapping full-backs to join the attack. Predominantly left footed, he is also a well-known free kick specialist. However, he has drawn criticism at times in the media over his limited defensive skills and work-rate.

== Other ventures ==
In November 2012, along with fellow Premier League players Santi Cazorla and Michu, Mata bought shares in former club Real Oviedo, who were struggling to raise €2 million to stay afloat in the Spanish third division.

Mata and his father Juan Manuel Mata were part-owners of Tapeo and Wine, a Spanish restaurant on Deansgate in Manchester city centre, which opened in 2016 and closed in 2020 as a result of COVID-19. Mata and his father felt that authentic Spanish food options in Manchester were insufficient and so wanted to create their own restaurant. At the time, both Manchester managers, Pep Guardiola and José Mourinho were regular patrons.

In August 2017, Mata announced in an article for The Players' Tribune that he was pledging one percent of his salary to a pledge-based charitable movement named Common Goal, and called for other football players to do the same.

In 2023, Mata joined the investment group of the Alpine racing team of Formula One.

On 20 November 2024, Mata joined the ownership group of Major League Soccer club San Diego FC.

On 18 June 2025, Mata in collaboration with Portuguese player Sérgio Oliveira, would become the latest investors in Mercury/13, a women's multi-club network that owns FC Como Women in Serie A. Former Italy international Giorgio Chiellini is also an investor. In an official statement at Sports Summit Madrid 2025, Mata said:

"I’ve always believed that sport is a powerful tool for creating change. Women’s football has enormous potential and deserves the investment, respect, and visibility that has long been overdue. I’m proud to join Mercury 13 – a project with real purpose and long-term vision. Since Victoire Cogevina joined the platform as an ambassador, we’ve been exploring the possibility of my involvement as an investor. I’m thrilled to announce it here in my home country, where Mercury 13 will soon begin operations to help grow women’s football, which in Spain currently boasts the world’s most successful team. Right now, they are the reigning champions, and we’re incredibly proud of their performance both as athletes and as individuals”."

On 27 June 2025, Mata was appointed a Member of the Most Excellent Order of the British Empire (MBE) for his services to sport and charity, having been included in King Charles III's 2023 list of honorary awards to foreign nationals.

On 29 June 2026, Mata purchased a stake in the ownership of Melbourne Victory, and will also chair a new football committee as part of the club after retirement.

== Career statistics ==
=== Club ===
Appearances and goals by club, season and competition
Club	Season	League			National cup (Note: Includes Copa del Rey, FA Cup, Turkish Cup)		League cup (Note: Include Football League/EFL Cup)		Continental		Other		Total	
Club	Season	Division	Apps	Goals	Apps	Goals	Apps	Goals	Apps	Goals	Apps	Goals	Apps	Goals
Real Madrid Castilla	2006–07	Segunda División	39	9	—		—		—		—		39	9
Valencia	2007–08	La Liga	24	5	8	4	—		1 (Note: Appearance(s) in UEFA Champions League)	0	—		33	9
Valencia	2008–09	La Liga	37	11	2	1	—		6 (Note: Appearances in UEFA Cup)	1	2 (Note: Appearances in Supercopa de España)	1	47	14
Valencia	2009–10	La Liga	35	9	2	0	—		14 (Note: Appearances in UEFA Europa League)	5	—		51	14
Valencia	2010–11	La Liga	33	8	3	0	—		7	1	—		43	9
Valencia	Total		129	33	15	5	—		28	7	2	1	174	46
Chelsea	2011–12	Premier League	34	6	7	4	1	0	12	2	—		54	12
Chelsea	2012–13	Premier League	35	12	6	1	5	2	14 (Note: Six appearances and three goals in UEFA Champions League, eight appearances and one goal in UEFA Europa League)	4	4 (Note: One appearance in FA Community Shield, one appearance in UEFA Super Cup, two appearances and one goal in FIFA Club World Cup)	1	64	20
Chelsea	2013–14	Premier League	13	0	0	0	2	1	2	0	0	0	17	1
Chelsea	Total		82	18	13	5	8	3	28	6	4	1	135	33
Manchester United	2013–14	Premier League	15	6	—		—		—		—		15	6
Manchester United	2014–15	Premier League	33	9	2	1	0	0	—		—		35	10
Manchester United	2015–16	Premier League	38	6	4	3	1	0	11 (Note: Seven appearances and one goal in UEFA Champions League, four appearances in UEFA Europa League)	1	—		54	10
Manchester United	2016–17	Premier League	25	6	3	0	3	2	10	2	1 (Note: Appearance in FA Community Shield)	0	42	10
Manchester United	2017–18	Premier League	28	3	5	0	1	0	6	0	0	0	40	3
Manchester United	2018–19	Premier League	22	3	3	1	1	1	6	1	—		32	6
Manchester United	2019–20	Premier League	19	0	4	1	3	0	11	2	—		37	3
Manchester United	2020–21	Premier League	9	1	1	0	2	2	6 (Note: One appearance in UEFA Champions League, five appearances in UEFA Europa League)	0	—		18	3
Manchester United	2021–22	Premier League	7	0	1	0	1	0	3	0	—		12	0
Manchester United	Total		196	34	23	6	12	5	53	6	1	0	285	51
Galatasaray	2022–23	Süper Lig	16	3	2	0	—		—		—		18	3
Vissel Kobe	2023	J1 League	1	0	—		—		—		—		1	0
Western Sydney Wanderers	2024–25	A-League Men	22	1	0	0	—		—		1 (Note: Appearance in A-League Men finals series)	0	23	1
Melbourne Victory	2025–26	A-League Men	24	5	0	0	—		—		1	0	25	5
Career total			509	103	53	16	20	8	109	19	9	2	700	148

=== International ===
Appearances and goals by national team and year
National team	Year	Apps	Goals
Spain	2009	7	3
Spain	2010	3	0
Spain	2011	6	2
Spain	2012	4	1
Spain	2013	12	3
Spain	2014	2	1
Spain	2015	4	0
Spain	2016	3	0
Total		41	10

Spain score listed first, score column indicates score after each Mata goal.

List of international goals scored by Juan Mata
No.	Date	Venue	Opponent	Score	Result	Competition
1	9 September 2009	Estadio Romano, Mérida, Spain	Estonia	3–0	3–0	2010 FIFA World Cup qualification
2	10 October 2009	Vazgen Sargsyan Republican Stadium, Yerevan, Armenia	Armenia	2–1	2–1	2010 FIFA World Cup qualification
3	14 October 2009	Bilino Polje, Zenica, Bosnia and Herzegovina	Bosnia and Herzegovina	5–0	5–2	2010 FIFA World Cup qualification
4	29 March 2011	Darius and Girėnas Stadium, Kaunas, Lithuania	Lithuania	3–1	3–1	UEFA Euro 2012 qualification
5	7 October 2011	Generali Arena, Prague, Czech Republic	Czech Republic	1–0	2–0	UEFA Euro 2012 qualification
6	1 July 2012	Olympic Stadium, Kyiv, Ukraine	Italy	4–0	4–0	UEFA Euro 2012
7	11 June 2013	Yankee Stadium, New York City, United States	Republic of Ireland	2–0	2–0	Friendly
8	20 June 2013	Maracanã Stadium, Rio de Janeiro, Brazil	Tahiti	8–0	10–0	2013 FIFA Confederations Cup
9	15 October 2013	Estadio Carlos Belmonte, Albacete, Spain	Georgia	2–0	2–0	2014 FIFA World Cup qualification
10	23 June 2014	Arena da Baixada, Curitiba, Brazil	Australia	3–0	3–0	2014 FIFA World Cup

== Honours ==
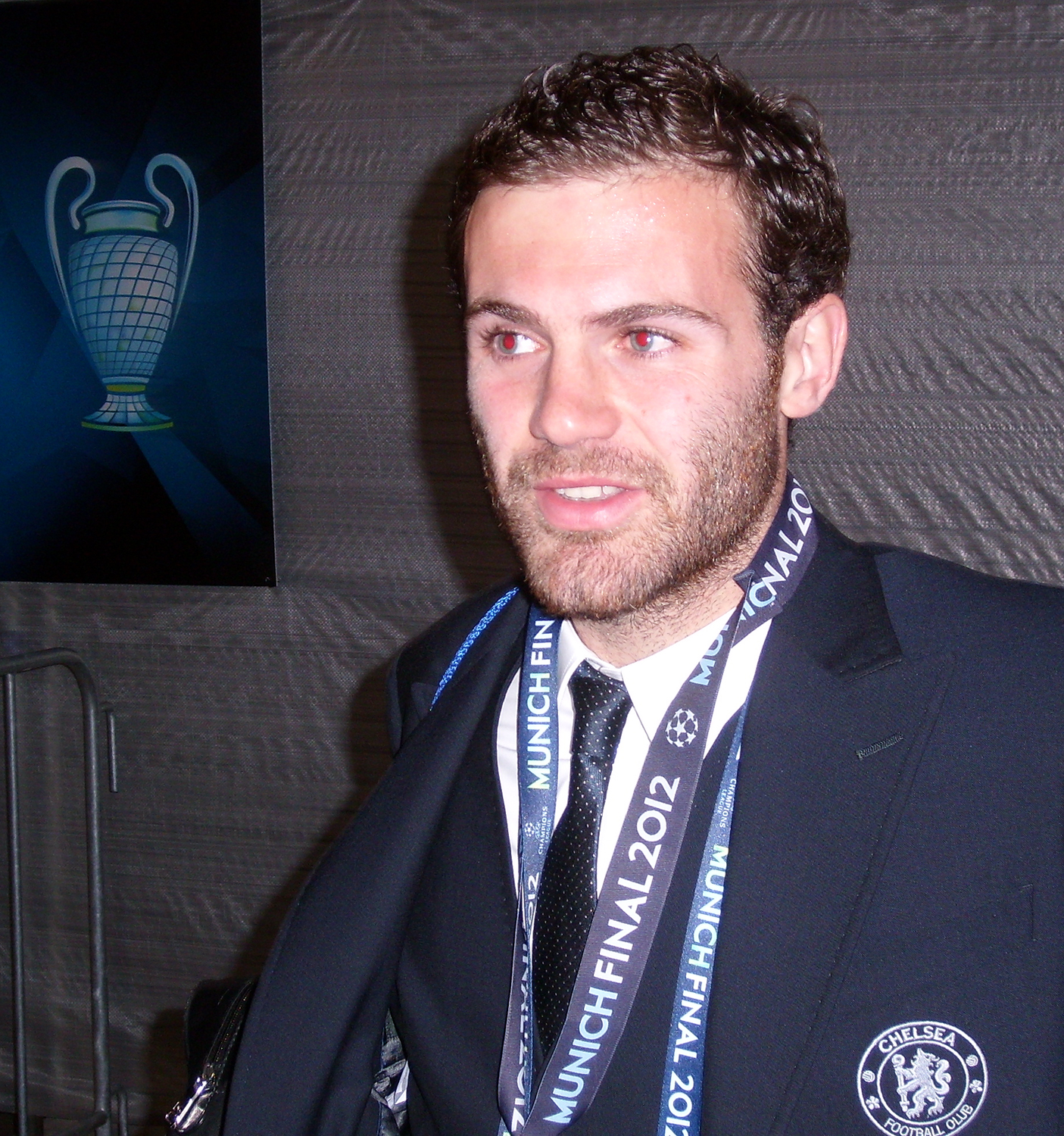
Mata in a Chelsea suit wearing his Champions League winners' medal

Valencia

- Copa del Rey: 2007–08

Chelsea

- FA Cup: 2011–12
- UEFA Champions League: 2011–12
- UEFA Europa League: 2012–13
- FIFA Club World Cup runner-up: 2012

Manchester United

- FA Cup: 2015–16; runner-up: 2017–18
- EFL Cup: 2016–17
- FA Community Shield: 2016
- UEFA Europa League: 2016–17; runner-up: 2020–21

Galatasaray

- Süper Lig: 2022–23

Vissel Kobe

- J1 League: 2023

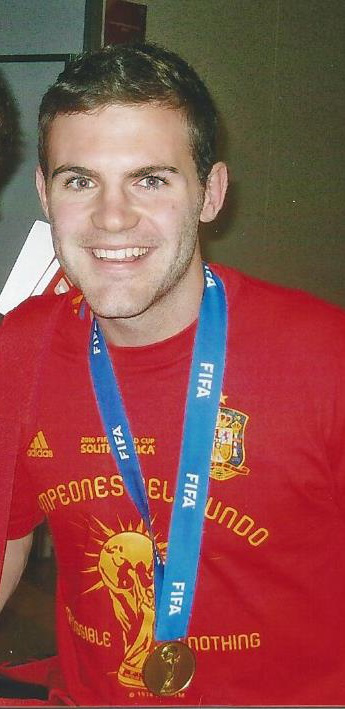
Mata wearing his World Cup winners' medal

Spain U19

- UEFA European Under-19 Championship: 2006

Spain U21

- UEFA European Under-21 Championship: 2011

Spain

- FIFA World Cup: 2010
- UEFA European Championship: 2012
- FIFA Confederations Cup runner-up: 2013; third place: 2009

Individual

- UEFA European Under-21 Championship Golden Player: 2011
- UEFA European Under-21 Championship Team of the Tournament: 2011
- Chelsea Player of the Year: 2012, 2013
- Chelsea Players' Player of the Year: 2013
- Premier League Player of the Month: October 2012
- PFA Team of the Year: 2012–13 Premier League
- Most assists in the Premier League: 2012–13
- Manchester United Goal of the Season: 2014–15 (vs. Liverpool, 22 March 2015)
- Melbourne Victory Player of the Season: 2025–26
- Johnny Warren Medal: 2025–26
- PFA A-League Men Team of the Season: 2025–26
