= Belén del Valle Díaz =

First woman prosecutor in Spain (1943–2025)

Belén del Valle Díaz (1943 – 19 May 2025) was a Spanish prosecutor. She was the first woman to pass the public examinations for the prosecution career in Spain.

== Life and career ==
Diaz was born in Cangas de Onís in 1943. After graduating in Law from the University of Oviedo, she was the first woman to pass the public examinations for the prosecution career in Spain. This access was prohibited for women until 1966 when Law 96/1966, of 28 December, was approved, which allowed them access to both the Public Prosecutor's Office and the Judiciary. After passing the public examinations, she was assigned to her first post in the public prosecutor's career in 1974.

Throughout her legal career, she held various positions: prosecutor in the Provincial Court of Tenerife (May 1974), Orense (December 1974) and Territorial Court of Oviedo (December 1976); lieutenant prosecutor of the Superior Court of Las Palmas (1984); coordinating prosecutor of the High Court of Justice of Asturias; lieutenant prosecutor of the Principality of Asturias, where she remained until retirement in 2013.

Del Valle Díaz was awarded the Order of Saint Raymond of Peñafor in 2005. She died on 19 May 2025, at the age of 82.
