= Juan Mata (footballer, born 1964) =

Spanish footballer (born 1964)

Personal information
- Full name: Juan Manuel Mata Rodríguez
- Date of birth: 27 April 1964 (age 62)
- Place of birth: Oviedo, Spain
- Height: 1.66 m (5 ft 5 in)
- Position: Forward

Senior career*
Years	Team	Apps	(Gls)
1981–1983	Real Oviedo	9	(0)
1983–1984	Oviedo Aficionados		
1985–1990	Real Burgos	128	(18)
1990–1991	Orihuela Deportiva	20	(1)
1991–1992	Salamanca	31	(9)
1993–1994	Cartagena	16	(4)
1994–1995	Langreo	5	(0)
Total		209	(30)
- * Club domestic league appearances and goals

Juan Manuel Mata Rodríguez (born 27 April 1964) is a Spanish former professional footballer who played as a forward.

== Early and personal life ==
Born in Oviedo, Mata is the father of footballer Juan Mata.

== Career ==
Mata played for Real Oviedo, Oviedo Aficionados, Real Burgos, Orihuela Deportiva, Salamanca, Cartagena and Langreo.

== Later life ==
He later co-owned a tapas restaurant in Manchester, England.
