= Teresa Meana Suárez =

Spanish feminist activist

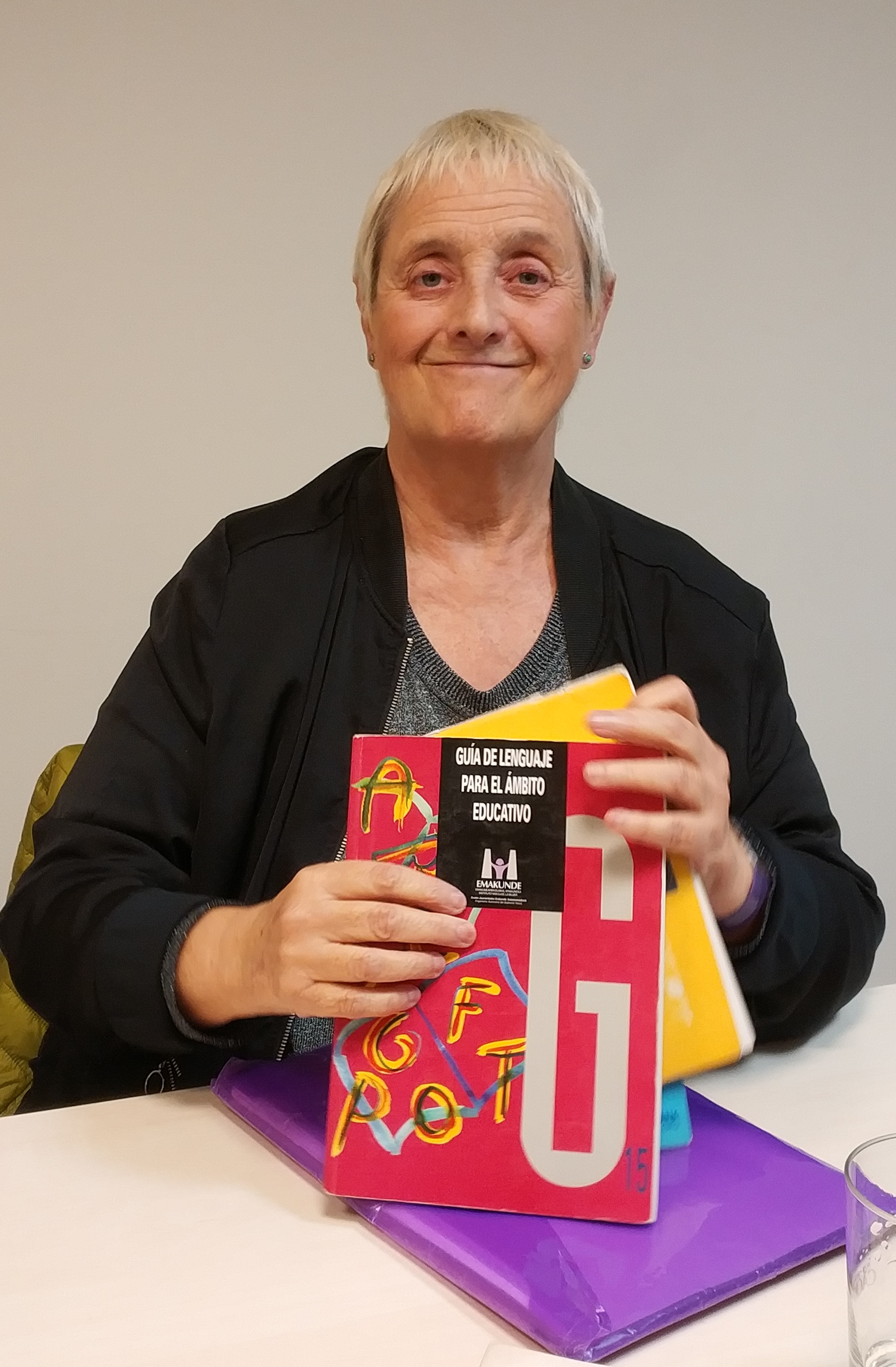
- (2018)
- Born: 1952; Gijón, Spain
- Occupations: Feminist activist; teacher; philologist
- Known for: Addressing the issue of sexism in language
- Notable work: Porque las palabras no se las lleva el viento

Teresa Meana Suárez (Gijón, 1952) is a Spanish feminist activist, teacher, and philologist specializing in inclusive and non-sexist language. She has published numerous articles on the issue of language discrimination against women, specifically, in Spanish.

== Biography ==
Meana has a degree in Romance Philology and has always worked as a Spanish language teacher in secondary education in Oviedo and Valencia, where she has lived for 25 years. She has been a member of the feminist movement since 1975.

She met clandestinely with her colleagues at the university and attended student assemblies. They read the prohibited texts and soon organized themselves to organize conferences, debates, and talks that would flesh out those ideas that they defended with their heads and their own bodies.

Since the 1980s, she has dedicated herself especially to addressing the issue of sexism in language, a specialty on which she has given numerous lectures and workshops throughout Spain.

For six years, she was in Latin America, where she specialized in the characteristics of Spanish language on the other side of the Atlantic Ocean. In Santo Domingo, Dominican Republic, she published an instruction book on a non-sexist use of the language and taught a course on the same subject in a university in the Dominican capital. She traveled with other women through Mexico, Guatemala, Nicaragua, Costa Rica, Panama, Colombia, Ecuador, Peru, Bolivia, Argentina, Uruguay, and Chile, always received, helped, and housed by feminists from those countries.

She is a noted linguist in the academic field for her critical and purposeful analysis of the androcentric opacity of social discourse. She has published various articles on issues related to the invisibility of women in language. In 2002, she published a manual on a non-sexist use of language, entitled Porque las palabras no se las lleva el viento (Because the words are not carried away by the wind). In 2016, she attended the 2016 Feminist Debate Conference in Montevideo, as a special guest. She also carried out an activity on language, sexism, and communication at the Centro de Formación de la Cooperación Española (Spanish Cooperation Training Center).

Since she arrived in Valencia, Meana has actively participated in the Casa de la Dona. In 2018, she was recognized as the adoptive daughter of Valencia for having developed her activism in the city with the aim of creating a more inclusive, open, and feminist society.

== Awards and honours ==
- 2009. Margarida Borràs Award, from the Lambda collective in Valencia.
- 2010. Guest of Honor and Gold Medal of the Autonomous City of Buenos Aires.
- 2010. Illustrious Visitor of Bahía Blanca (Argentina).
- 2018. Adoptive daughter of Valencia.

== Selected works ==
- Porque las palabras no se las lleva el viento (Valencia, Ayuntamiento de Quart de Poblet, 2002)

== See also ==
- Gender neutrality in languages with grammatical gender
