= Carlos D. Cidon =

Spanish chef and author

Carlos Dominguez Cidon (born 1959, León, died 11 May 2009 in León) was a chef and author from Spain.

== Biography ==
Cidon's grandfather was a food lover and occasional cook. Cidon grew observing his grandfather cook, and he inherited his love for food from him.

In 1975, Cidon got a job in a restaurant named "Akelarre", alongside Pedro Subijana, a well known chef of the era. In 1977, Cidon decided he wanted to pursue a career as a chef himself.

Cidon's presence in modern Spanish cuisine began expanding after he graduated from college, and he became a well-respected cook during the decade of the 1980s, while also studying the relationship between delicate drinks such as wine and food. Eventually, wines became one of his favorite ingredients.

In 1989, he had the opportunity to open his first restaurant, "Vivaldi". By 1994, Cidon was able to reopen the Leon historical center. He helped the center by cooking some of his most famous plates there.

In 1999, Cidon received the highest award a chef can get in Spain: the "Premio Alimentos", given by Spain's ministry of agriculture. The next year, he inaugurated his second restaurant, "El Cesar".

In 2004, American tire business giant Michelin gave Cidon their "Estrella de la Guia Michelin" award ("Michelin Guiding Star"), given by that company to Spain's top business achievers.

Cidon was named as delegate of Castilla and Leon and commissary of nutrition matters in Brussels. In addition, he has toured many countries as a restaurant guest chef, including the United States, England, Portugal, Italy, France, Germany, the Netherlands and Puerto Rico.

== List of books written by Cidon ==
- Setas y Hongos en la Cocina de Carlos Cidon
- Cocinando con Quesos Españoles ("Cooking With Cheeses from Spain")
- Festeja con Sugerentes Recetas la Navidad ("Spend Your Christmas With Suggestive Recipes")
- El Vino en la Mesa y la Cocina ("Wine on the Table and Kitchen")
- La Cocina del Botillo y la Reineta del Bierzo ("Botillo's Kitchen and Bierzo's Reineta")
- Nuevas Gildas, Quesos y Aperitivos Para el Siglo XXI ("New Gildas, Cheeses and Appetizers for the 21st. century")
- Verduras: Salud, Color y Sabor en tu Mesa ("Verduras: Health, Color and Flavor on Your Table")
- Legumbres: Las Semillas Mágicas ("Legumbre: Magic Seeds")
