= Church of San Francisco (León) =

Catholic church in León, Spain

Coordinates: 42°35′36″N 5°34′13″W

Saint Francis Church
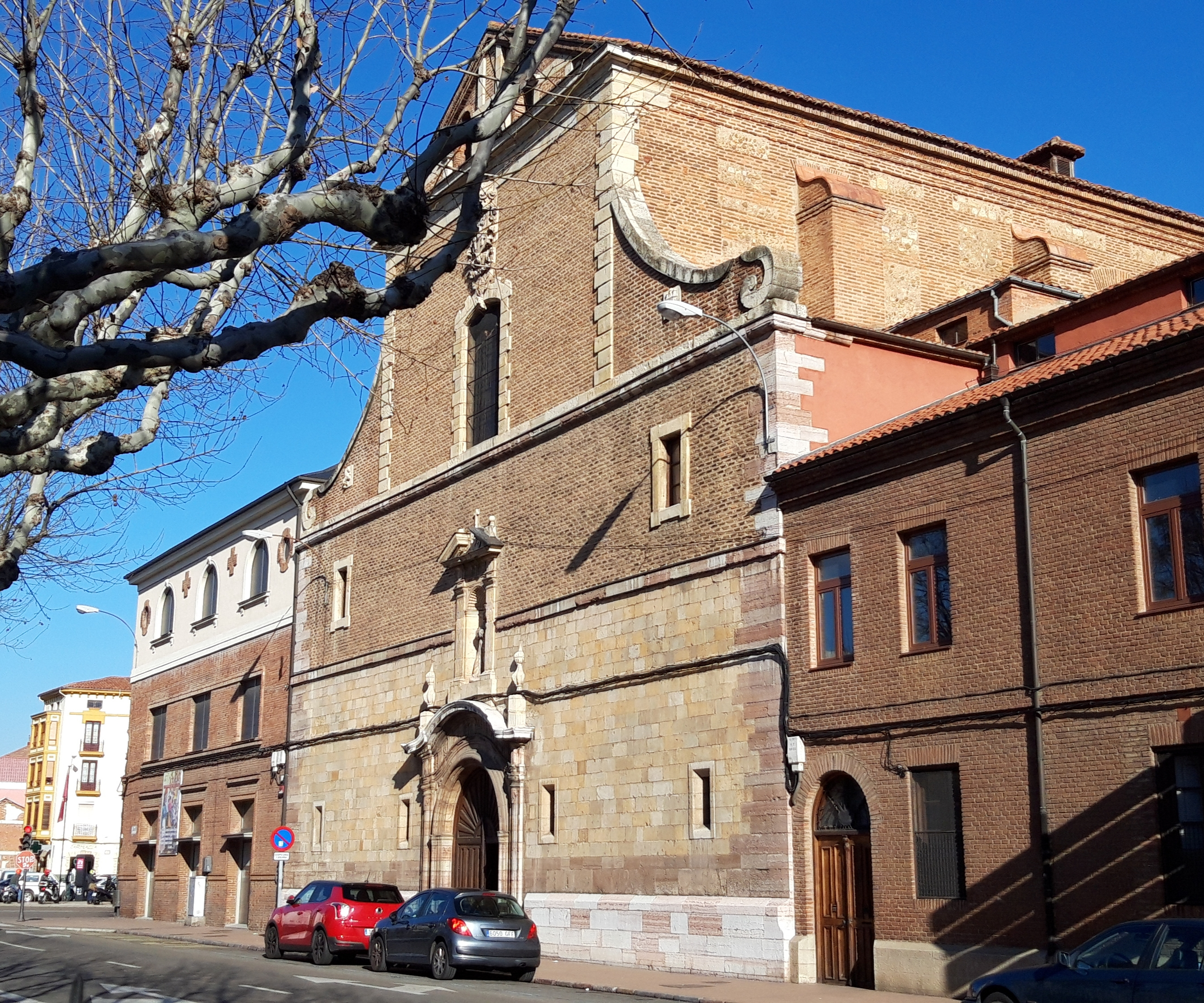

Religion
- Affiliation: Roman Catholic
- Province: León
- Region: Castile and León
- Ecclesiastical or organisational status: Parish church
- Status: Active

Location
- Municipality: León
- State: Spain
- Interactive map of Saint Francis Church

Architecture
- Architect: Francisco de Rivas
- Groundbreaking: 1763
- Completed: 1791

The Church of San Francis of Assisi is a Catholic parish church in the city of León, Spain, located on Corredera Street in front of the San Francisco Garden. It is one of the main churches of the city and is associated with the convent of the Capuchins.

== History ==
Built in the southern part outside of the walled city, the first church of San Francisco was built in the 13th century. In 1763, during the reign of Charles III, the construction of the current church began. It was built larger than the previous one and with classicist forms. Under the direction of Francisco de Rivas, the church finished its construction in 1791 already under the reign of Charles IV.

In 1880, the Third Order of Saint Francis bought the church and convent after 44 years without religious use, beginning the restoration of the church building. In this period, the main altar was placed, one of the jewels of the church. The current altarpiece of the church of San Francisco was once the altarpiece of the Cathedral of León made in 1733, which for almost one and a half centuries presided over the Leon cathedral.

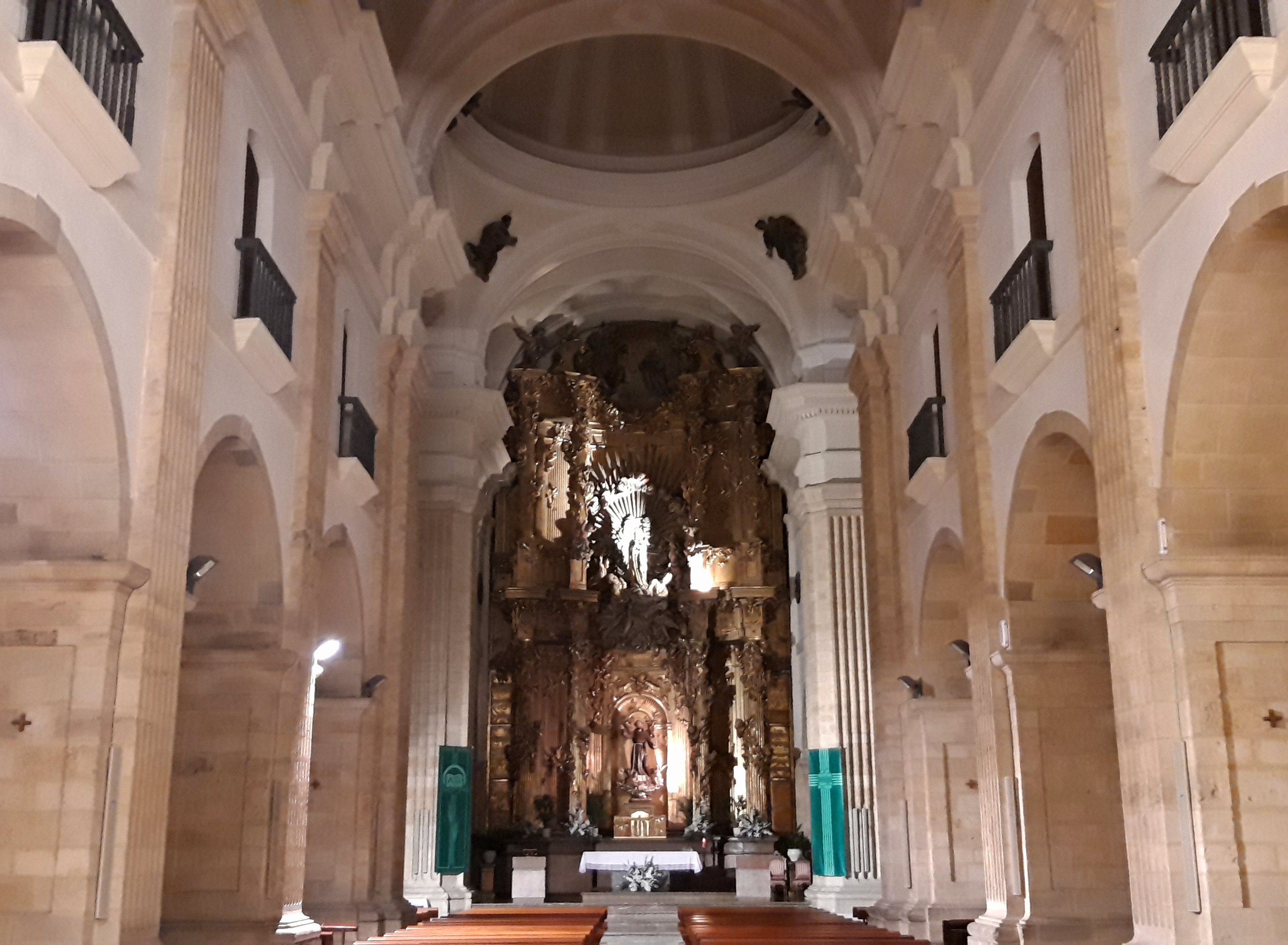
Interior of the Church of San Francisco

At the end of the 19th century, during the restoration of the cathedral by Juan de Madrazo, the altarpiece was dismantled to return it to the church with more Gothic forms. At that time, the Capuchin community decided to buy the baroque altarpiece and install it in the church of San Francisco. The church's restoration work was completed in 1882. Several restorations in the twentieth century stand out, particularly in 1964 and 1996.

== Architecture ==
Like many churches of this period, the Church of San Francisco follows the model established in the Church of the Gesù of Rome, which was a significant model for many Catholic, especially Jesuit, Baroque churches. The façade repeats, with simpler materials, the general composition of the Gesù, including the large scrolls supporting the upper region of the nave. In plan, the church echoes the Gesù's single nave with side chapels, shallow transepts, and a dome over the crossing.

The church is attached to the convent of the Capuchin order, which highlights its cloister, and the San Francisco theater.
