= Mario Amilivia =

Spanish politician

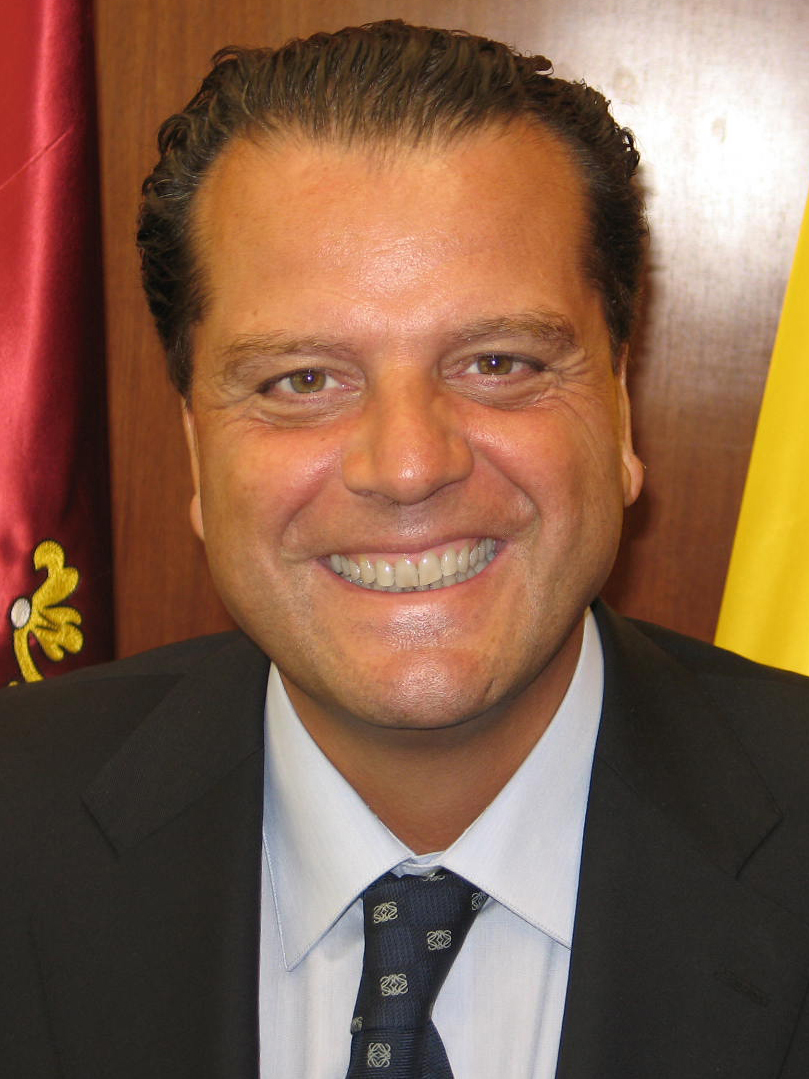
Mario Amilivia

Mario Amilivia (9 November 1957 in León, Spain) is a Spanish politician. He has served as mayor of León, Spain on two occasions: from 1995 to 2003, and from December 2004 to June 2007. He comes from a prominent Leonese family; his grandfather, Antonio Amilivia, was president of the football club Cultural y Deportiva Leonesa in the 1950s, and the local soccer field is named after Antonio Amilivia. Mario Amilivia is married and has two daughters.

He received a law degree, and has served as secretary-general of the Association of Anthracite Mining Companies (Asociación de Empresas de Minas de Antracita, APEMA). For five years, he was associate professor of Constitutional Law at the University of León. He was also president of the Regional Federation of Municipalities and provinces of Castile-León (Federación Regional de Municipios y Provincias de Castilla y León) (1999–2003), president of the Partido Popular of León (1986–1989; 1993–2000). He has also served as regional vice-secretary of the Partido Popular of Castile-León. He served in the Spanish Parliament as deputy for Leon province from 1986 to 1989.
