= Himno a León =

Song by Odón Alonso

The Himno a León was composed by the musician Odón Alonso, director of the Orfeón Leonés in 1934. The lyrics were written by J. Pinto Maestro. It was composed to commemorate the fifth centennial of the epic El Paso Honroso.

Since 1978, it is the official anthem of the city of León, Spain, and it is often used as the anthem of the Province of León.

Sin León no hubiera España,
que antes que Castilla leyes,
concilios, fueros y reyes,
dieron prestigio a León.

La fama cantó su hazaña
con clarines de victoria:
¡León escribió la historia
de Covadonga a Colón!

Con su sangre a torrentes vertida
dio a la Patria preciado blasón
y en sus labios cobró vida
el hermoso lenguaje español.

¡Viva León!

Tierra hidalga, tierra mía:
estrofas del romancero,
desde Guzmán a don Suero,
van tremolando el honor.

¡Es León!

Con su sangre a torrentes vertida
dio a la Patria preciado blasón
y en sus labios cobró vida
el hermoso lenguaje español.

¡Viva León!

De piedra una plegaria
la catedral semeja,
sobria y gentil refleja
el alma de León.

De historia milenaria,
de santidad osario,
del arte relicario
y de la fe expresión.

Tierra hidalga, tierra mía:
estrofas del romancero,
desde Guzmán a don Suero,
va tremolando el honor.

¡Es León!

Con su sangre a torrentes vertida
dio a la Patria preciado blasón
y en sus labios cobró vida
el hermoso lenguaje español.

¡Viva León!

Gloria a ti, pueblo sin par;
a mi labio el corazón
se asoma para gritar:

¡Viva León! ¡Viva León!
