= Convento de San Marcos =

Coordinates: 42°36′5.8″N 5°34′55.2″W

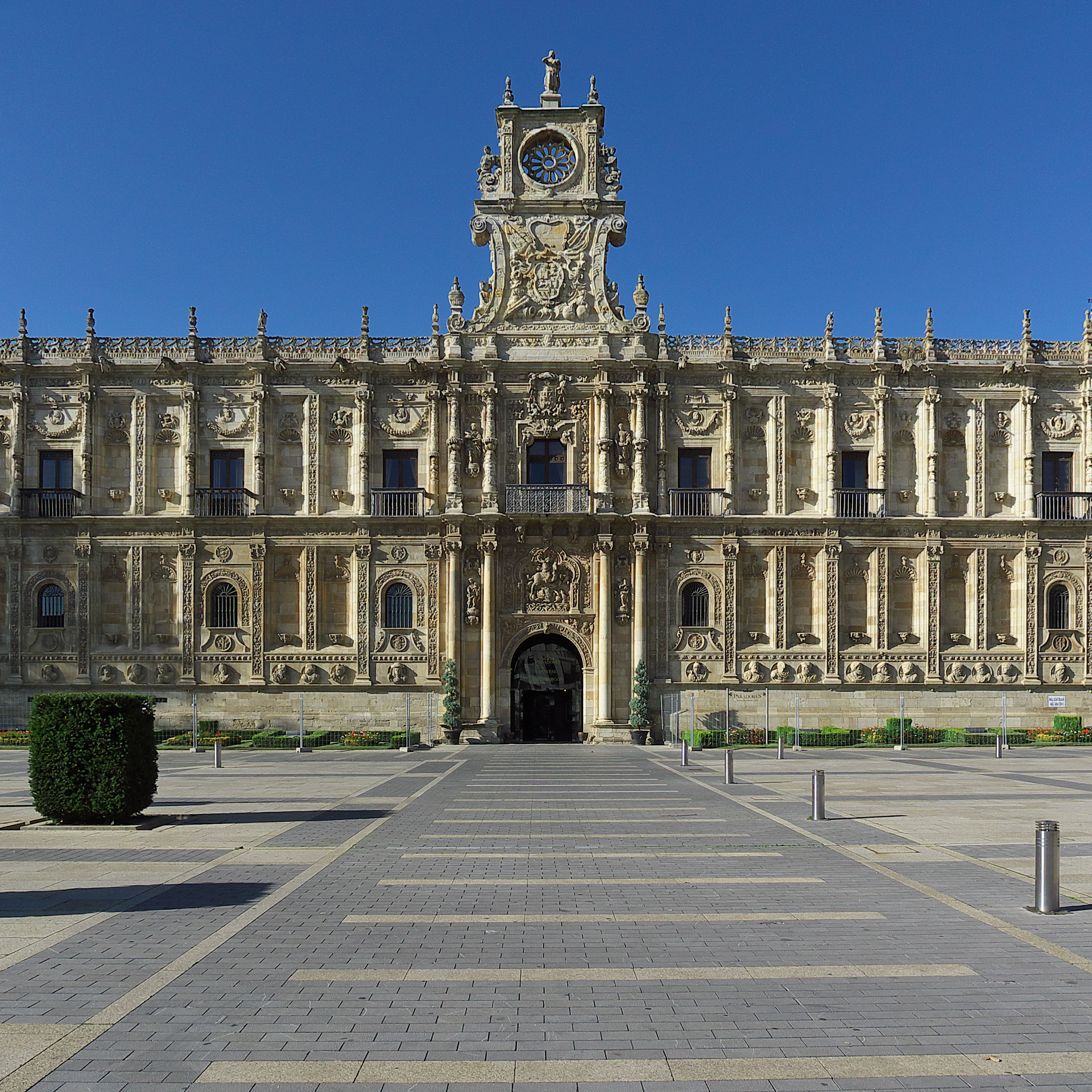
- Main façade of the convent
- Interactive map of the Convento de San Marcos area
- Alternative names: Parador de León
- Hotel chain: Paradores

General information
- Location: León, Spain

Website
- Parador de León

Spanish Cultural Heritage
- Type: Non-movable
- Criteria: Monument
- Designated: 24 September 1845
- Reference no.: RI-51-0000002

The Convento de San Marcos was a convent in the city of León, Castile and León, Spain, that is today an operating luxury parador hotel. It also contains a consecrated church and museum, and is one of the most important monuments of the Renaissance in Spain. It is one of the greatest architectural jewels of León, together with the Cathedral, the Basilica of San Isidoro and la Casa Botines. It has a highly ornamental plateresque facade.

The origins of this building lie in the twelfth century, in the days of Alfonso VII of León. His sister, the Infanta Sancha of Castile, made a donation in July 1152 to construct a modest building on the outskirts of the walled city, on the banks of the Bernesga, where "the poor of Christ" could stay. This would be a hospital-temple of shelter for pilgrims travelling the Camino de Santiago. Also, the building was the main residence for the Order of Santiago in the Kingdom of León. In 1176, Pedro Fernández de Castro, the first maestre of the Order of Santiago was elected as the first prior, and in 1184 he was buried in his church.

The darkest period in the monastery of San Marcos's five centuries of history is concentrated in just four years. During the course of the Spanish Civil War cells, rooms, stables, cloisters, church, choir, museum and every fast corner of the building were transformed into impromptu dungeons or jailers' offices, in what became officially known as "Campo de concentración de San Marcos" (San Marcos concentration camp). Between July 1936 and the end of 1940, up to 7,000 men and 300 women were imprisoned at the same time. It is estimated that, over the entire war and the period immediately following, the number of Republican militia members and political prisoners that passed through its cells totaled some 20,000. In the province of León, around 3,000 deaths are recorded due to the repression, and a good number of these came from the dungeons of San Marcos.

== History of construction ==
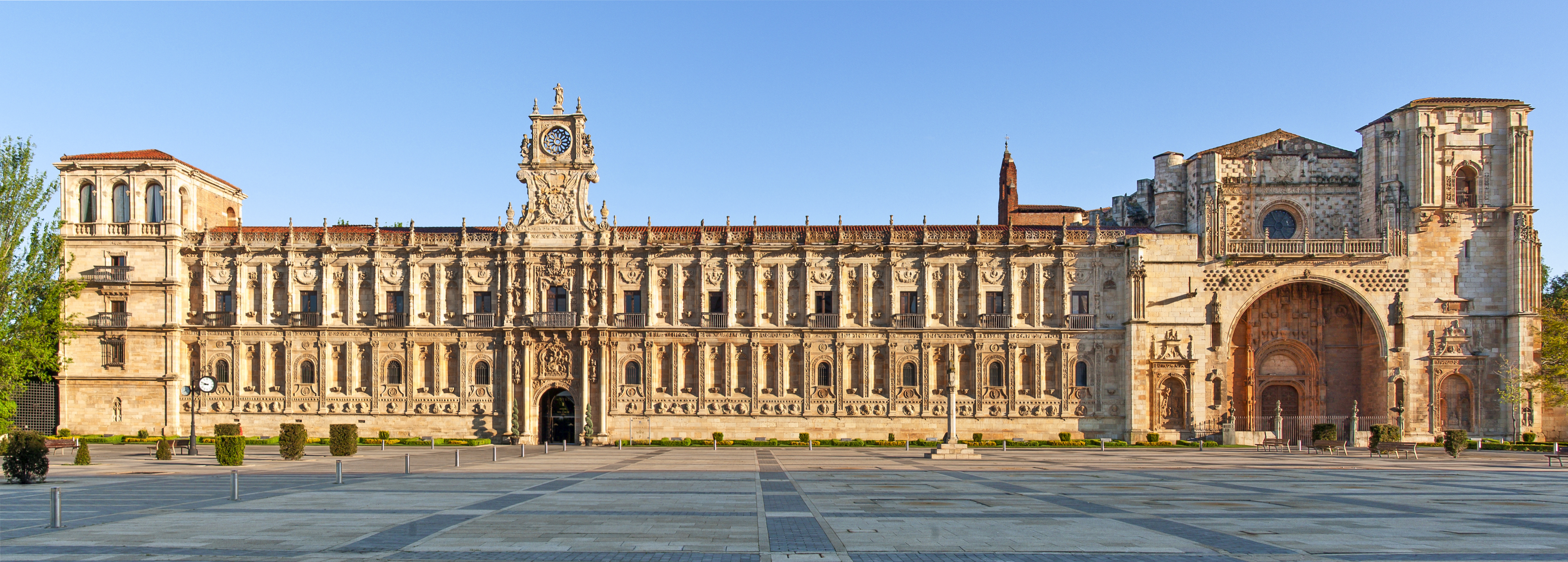
Church and convent of San Marcos

In the sixteenth century, the medieval building was found to be in poor condition, so it was demolished and a new work was carried out thanks to a grant from Ferdinand the Catholic King in 1514. The architects appointed for this work were: Juan Orozco (church), Martin Villarreal (front facade) and Juan de Badajoz el Mozo (cloister and sacristy). However, the new work was not started until well into the reign of Charles I. It is known that the wall of the main facade of the convent was built from the entrance up to the church in 1537, and this was consecrated in 1541. In the following years, Orozco constructed the sculptures of the facade, the choir area was completed, and in 1549 Juan de Badajoz finished the sacristy. Work was suspended in 1566 due to the move of the religious community to Calera and then to Mérida, but the return of the friars to San Marcos in 1602 gave impetus to continue the work. In 1615, the staircase was built, and in 1679 was completed the still missing part of the cloister. Finally, between 1711 and 1715 there was a large expansion of the building, with another wall being raised that went from the main entrance to the river, and ending at the palace tower. This new wall perfectly mimics the one built in the sixteenth century, with any artistic difference between the two halves of the facade being barely noticeable.

Today, it is a hostel belonging to the state-owned Paradores and a church with a museum. It is necessary step in the Camino de Santiago.

== See also ==
- Plateresque style
- List of Jesuit sites
- Political prisoners in Francoist Spain
