= León, Spain =

City in Spain

León Llión (Leonese)
- Municipality
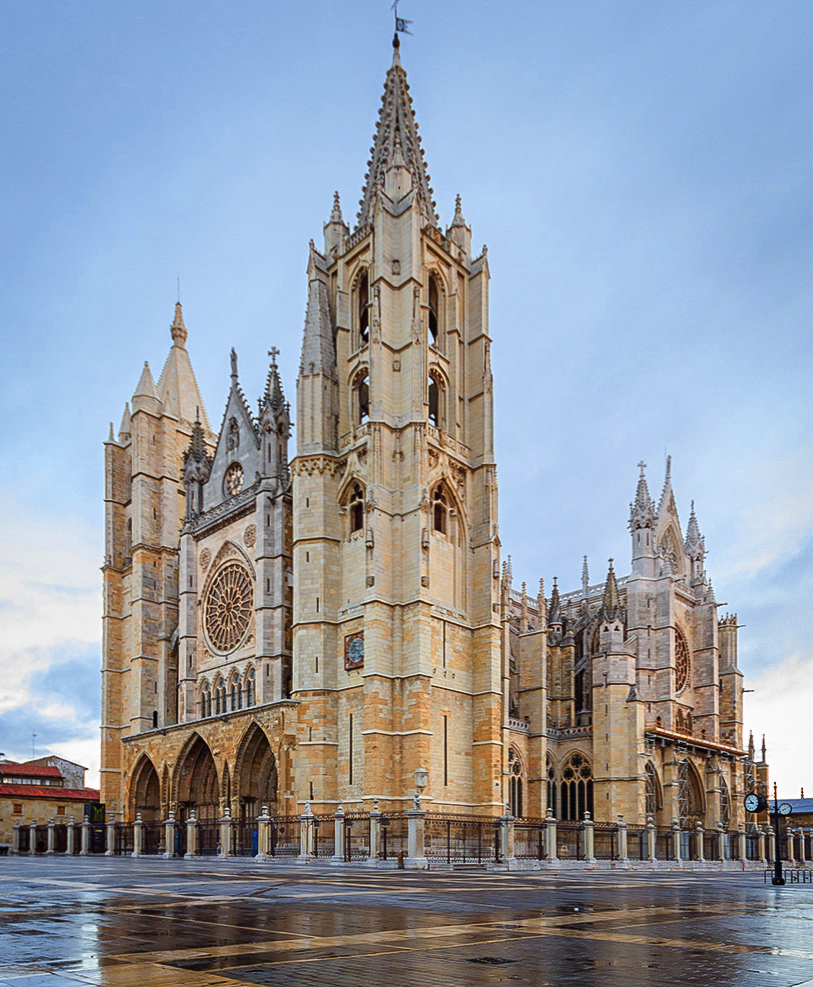
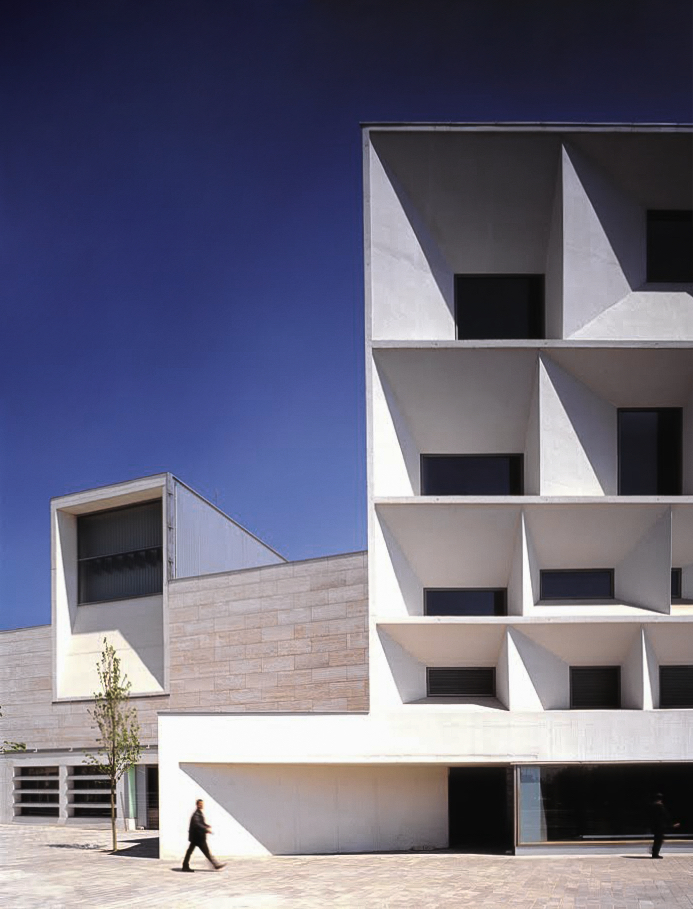
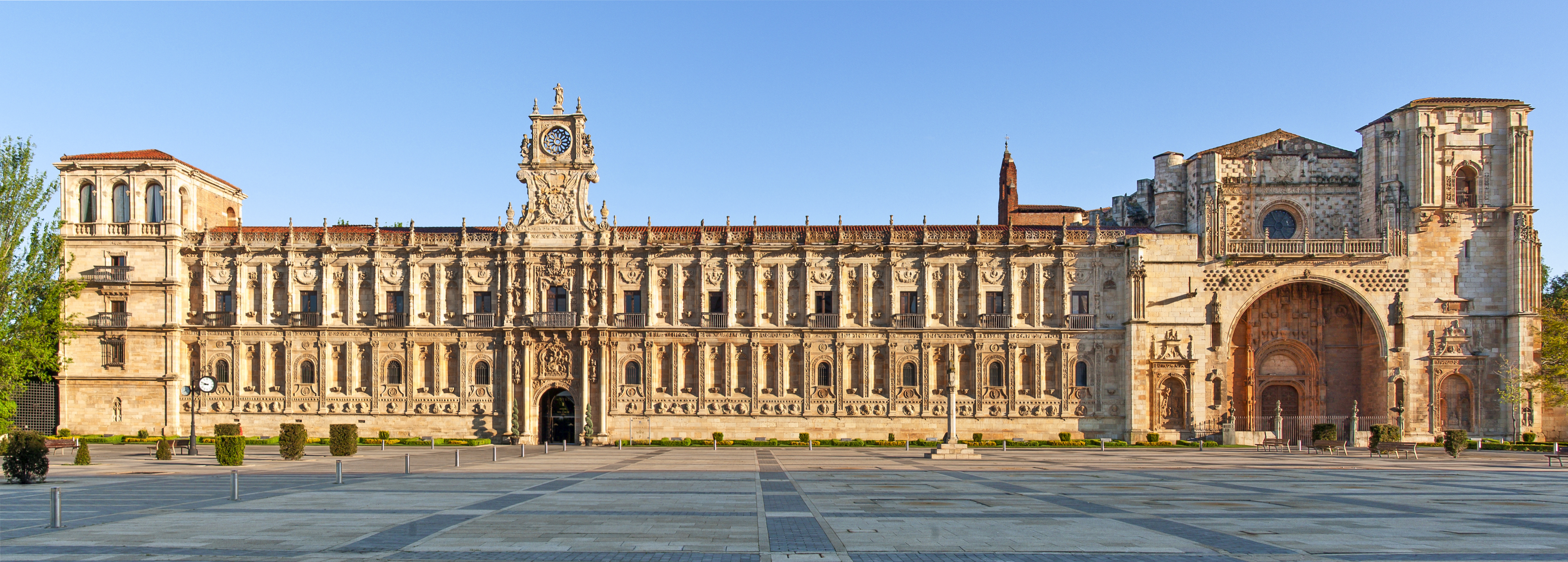
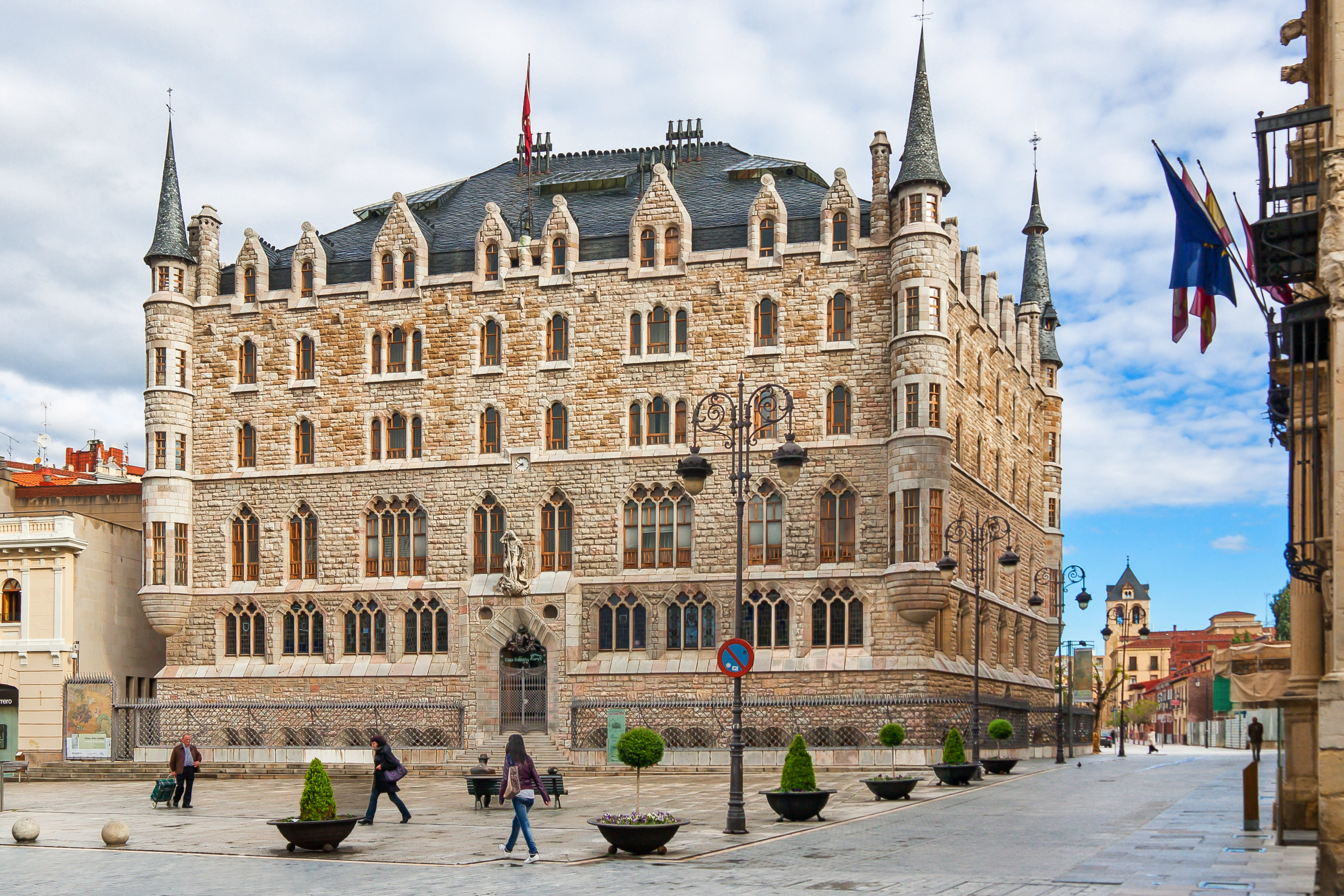
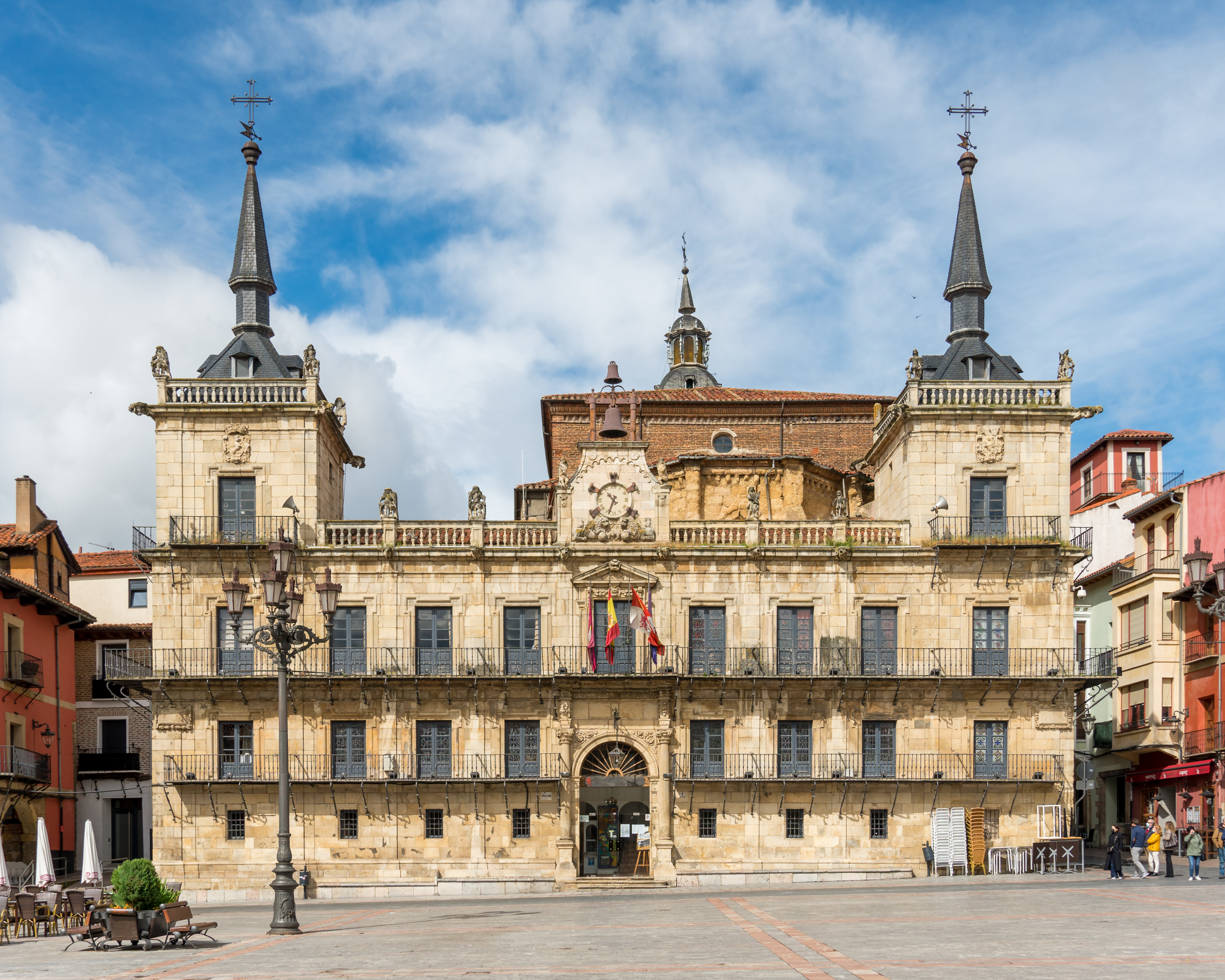
- Cathedral Auditorium Convento de San Marcos Casa Botines Old city hall

- Flag Coat of arms
- Anthem: Himno a León
- Interactive map of León
- Coordinates: 42°36′20″N 5°34′12″W
- Country: Spain
- Autonomous community: Castile and León
- Province: León
- Founded: 1st century BC
- Founded by: Legio VI Victrix

Government
  - Type: Ayuntamiento
  - Body: Ayuntamiento de León
  - Mayor: José Antonio Diez (PSOE)

Area
  - Total: 39.03 km^{2} (15.07 sq mi)
- Elevation: 837 m (2,746 ft)

Population (2024)
  - Total: 122,866
  - Density: 3,148/km^{2} (8,153/sq mi)
  - Metro (2013): 200,560
- Demonym(s): Leonese; Leonés/leonesa or Legionense (Spanish); Llïonés (Leonese)
- Time zone: UTC+1 (CET)
  - Summer (DST): UTC+2 (CEST)
- Postal code: 24001 - 24010
- Telephone prefix: 987
- Website: Ayuntamiento de León

León (Spanish: [leˈon]; Leonese: Llión [ʎiˈoŋ]) is a city and municipality of Spain and the capital of the province of León located in the autonomous community of Castile and León. The city lies on the northwest of the Iberian Peninsula, south of the Cantabrian Mountains in between the Bernesga and the Torío rivers. The municipality has a registered population of 122,866, and is the centre of a metropolitan area (including the neighbouring San Andrés del Rabanedo) of around 0.2 million.

Founded as the military encampment of the Legio VI Victrix around 29 BC, its standing as an encampment city was consolidated with the definitive settlement of the Legio VII Gemina from 74 AD. Following a period of political disorganization in the Duero Valley with settlements largely dislocated from emiral rule, León was populated towards 856 by the Kingdom of Asturias. After 910, the Asturian dynasty transferred their political centre from Oviedo to León, which henceforth became the head of the Kingdom of León.

Because of the hosting of the 1188 Cortes of León including a third estate with representatives from cities, the city has promoted the status of "cradle of Parliamentarism" in Europe, backed up by UNESCO and other institutions.

The city's prominence began to decline in the early Middle Ages, partly due to the loss of independence after the union of the Leonese kingdom with the Crown of Castile, consolidated in 1301.

After a period of stagnation during the early modern age, it was one of the first cities to hold an uprising in the Spanish War of Independence, and some years later, in 1833 acquired the status of provincial capital. The end of the 19th and the 20th century saw a significant acceleration in the rate of urban expansion, when the city became an important communications hub of the northwest due to the rise of the coal mining industry and the arrival of the railroad.

León's historical and architectural heritage, as well as the numerous festivals hosted throughout the year (particularly noteworthy are the Easter processions) and its location on the French Way of the Camino de Santiago, which is ranked as a UNESCO World Heritage Site, make it a destination of both domestic and international tourism. Some of the city's most prominent historical buildings are the Cathedral, one of the finest examples of French-style classic Gothic architecture in Spain, the Basilica of San Isidoro, one of the most important Romanesque churches in Spain and resting place of León's medieval monarchs, the Monastery of San Marcos, an example of plateresque and Renaissance Spanish architecture, and the Casa Botines, a Modernist creation of the architect Antoni Gaudí. An example of modern architecture is the city's Museum of Contemporary Art or MUSAC.

== History ==
=== Origins as a Roman military encampment ===
León was founded in the 1st century BC by the Roman legion Legio VI Victrix, which served under Caesar Augustus during the Cantabrian Wars (29-19 BC), the final stage of the Roman conquest of Hispania. In the year 74 AD, the Legio VII Gemina —recruited from the Hispanics by Galba in 69 AD— settled in a permanent military camp that was the origin of the city. Its modern name, León, is derived from the city's Latin name Castra Legionis.

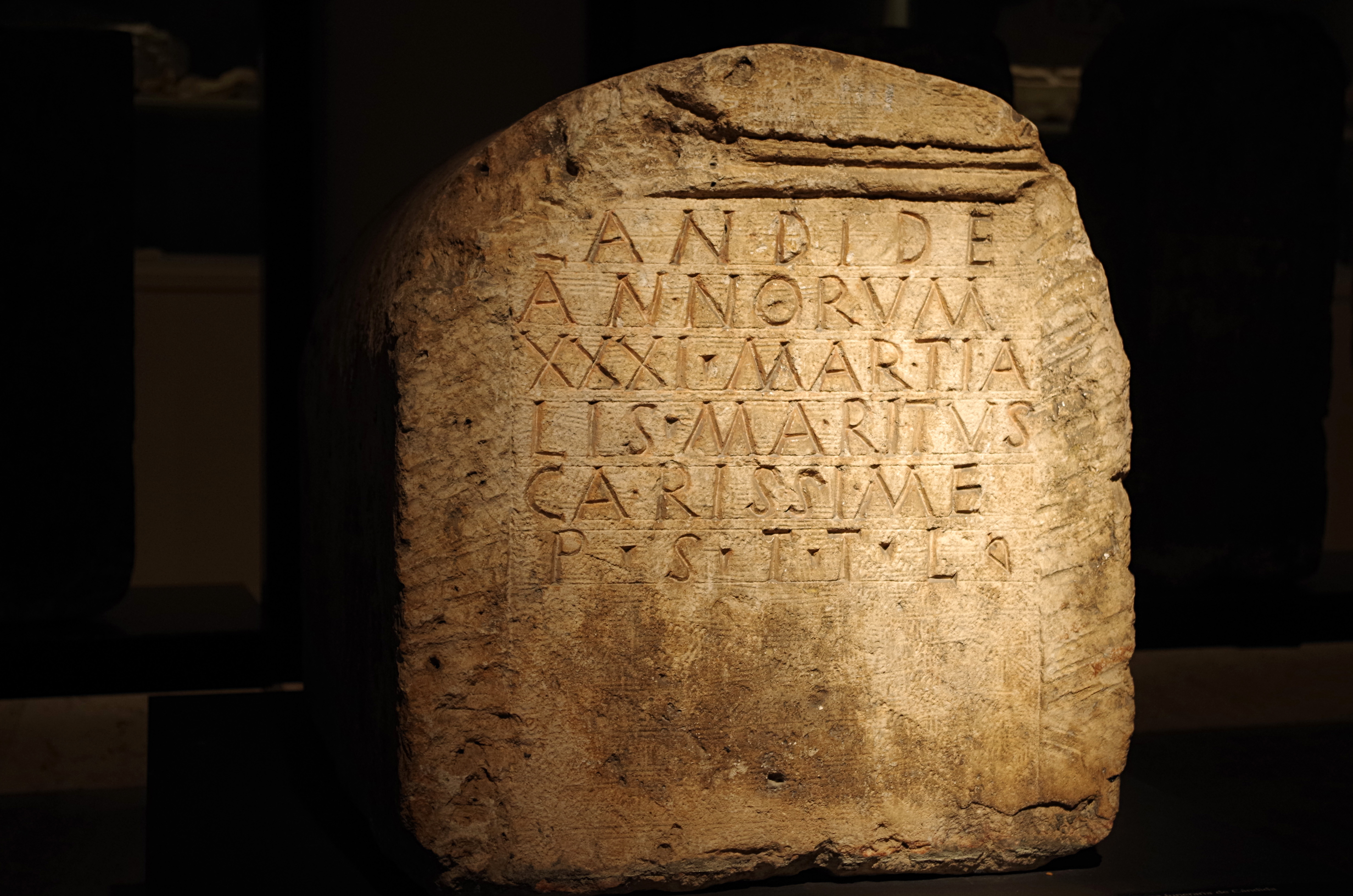
2nd century Roman stele found in the city walls

The Romans established the site of the city to protect the recently conquered territories of northwestern Hispania from the Astures and Cantabri, and to secure the transport of gold extracted in the province —especially in the huge nearby mines of Las Médulas— that was taken to Rome through Asturica Augusta (modern-day Astorga).

Tacitus calls the legion Galbiana, to distinguish it from the old Legio VII Claudia, but this appellation is not found on any inscriptions. It appears to have received the appellation of Gemina on account of its amalgamation by Vespasian with one of the German legions, probably the Legio I Germanica. Its full name was Legio VII Gemina Felix. After serving in Pannonia, and in the civil wars, it was settled by Vespasian in Hispania Tarraconensis, to supply the place of the Legio VI Victrix and Legio X Gemina, two of the three legions ordinarily stationed in the province, but which had been withdrawn to Germany.

That its regular winter quarters, under later emperors, were at León, we learn from the Itinerary, Ptolemy, and the Notitiae Imperii, as well as from a few inscriptions; but there are numerous inscriptions to prove that a strong detachment of it was stationed at Tarraco, the chief city of the province.

Some elements of the original Roman encampment still survive in the modern city layout. Long sections of the Roman walls (built between the first century BC and the fourth century AD) are still standing. There are also archaeological exhibitions showing remains of the walls, gates, baths and an amphitheatre.

=== Late antiquity and early middle ages ===
Legio fully became a civilian settlement at some point under the Low Roman Empire, with civilian population from the Canabae located outside the walls entering the walled precinct. The place may have passed to Suebian control after the mid 5th century.

Towards 714, during the Umayyad conquest of Hispania, the place yielded to Arab chieftain Musa, offering no armed resistance. An attempt was made to settle the strongholds with Berbers, but the scheme was abandoned when the Berbers of northern Iberia rebelled against the Arabs and gave up their positions to join the Kharijite Revolt around 740.

Towards 846, a group of Mozarabs tried to repopulate the place, but a Muslim attack prevented that initiative. In 856, another attempt at repopulation was made under Ordoño I and was successful, bringing the territory into the orbit of the Kingdom of Asturias.

=== Head of the Kingdom of León ===
The political centre of the Asturian dynasty was transferred from Oviedo to León after 910.

Sacked by Almanzor in about 987, the city was reconstructed and repopulated by Alfonso V, whose Decree of 1017 regulated its economic life, including the functioning of its markets. León was a way-station for pilgrims on the Camino de Santiago leading to Santiago de Compostela. With Alfonso V of León the city had the "Fueru de Llión", an important letter of privileges.

In 1188, Alfonso IX of León gathered the three estates in the city of León (including representatives of the urban class) in the Cortes of León of 1188, making León the earliest parliament in Medieval Europe. Due to the written documentary corpus, the 1188 Cortes were recognised by the UNESCO in 2013 as "cradle" of parliamentarism.

Suburbs for traders and artisans sprang up, who, after the 13th century, began to influence the municipal government. During the early Middle Ages, the livestock industry produced a period of prosperity for the city.

León had an important Jewish community in the Middle Ages, and the reference to a Great Synagogue suggests the existence of more than one synagogue in the city. Evidence from 1488 records the transfer of one synagogue, with adjoining gardens and buildings, to the Sociedad de Santa Ana in the suburb of León, possibly on the site of the city's noted yeshiva. The fate of the Great Synagogue is known from a royal order of 14 September 1495, when the Catholic Monarchs granted it, with all its properties and rights, to the monastery of San Isidoro.

Spared from the seigneuralisation process of the Late Middle Ages, towards the end of the era León had consolidated as one of the 13 cities in the Meseta enjoying the right to vote at the Cortes of Castile.

=== Modern history ===
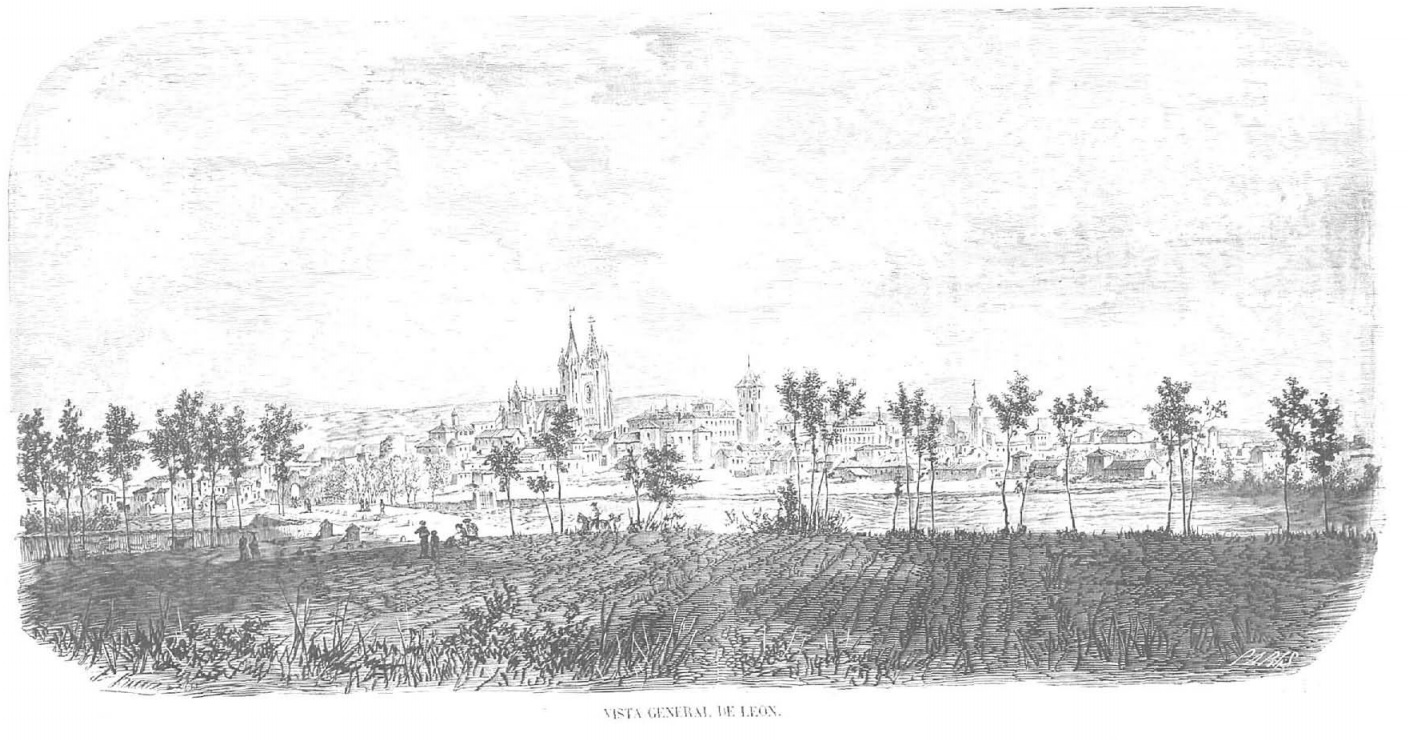
General view of León, published in 1867 in El Museo Universal.

In the 16th century, economic and demographic decline set in and continued until the 19th century. For the extent of the Early Modern period the city remained controlled by a reduced set of noble families by means of the regimientos and regidurías. The city population increased from 9,000 to 15,000 during the 19th century. The population further increased during the 20th century: 18,000 (1910), 44,000 (1940), 73,000 (1960), and 100,000 (1971). During the first decades of the 20th century, the city would be important as a railway center, with a significant socialist and anarchist labor movement, the city being the birthplace of Buenaventura Durruti, whose brother Manuel was killed in León during the Revolution of 1934.

The military coup d'état that marked the beginning of the Spanish Civil War took place (and succeeded) in León on 20 July 1936, with the putschist military officers meeting little resistance. The Catholic Church adhered to the rebels and instrumentalised the Catholic sentiment and traditions against the Republic. The rebels expanded from the city to the rest of the traditionally conservative province, which remained under rebel control except a small northern part connected to Asturias, that became part of the battlefront until the fall of the North in October 1937. Both the Convent of San Marcos, the old Santa Ana factory and the provincial prison were nonetheless rehabilitated as mass detention camps in the city by the Francoist side.

During the 1960s, León experienced much growth due to in-migration from the rural zones of the province.

== Districts ==
The city of León can be divided into more than 36 districts (barrios):

- Centro or downtown
- Casco Antiguo or Casco Histórico, the historical part of the city
- Área 17
- Armunia
- Cruce de Armunia
- El Crucero
- El Ejido
- Ensanche
- Eras De Renueva
- Ferral
- La Asunción
- La Chantría
- La Lastra
- La Palomera
- La Sal
- La Torre
- La Vega
- La Victoria
- Las Ventas
- Obra Sindical Del Hogar
- Oteruelo De La Valdoncina
- Paraíso-Cantinas
- Patronato Viviendas Militares
- Pinilla
- Puente Castro
- San Andrés del Rabanedo
- San Claudio
- San Esteban
- San Lorenzo
- San Mamés
- San Marcelo
- San Marcos
- San Martín
- San Pedro
- Santa Ana
- Santa Marina
- Santa Olaja
- Polígono 10
- Trobajo Del Cerecedo
- Trobajo Del Camino
- Villabalter

== Climate ==
León features a warm-summer Mediterranean climate (Köppen: Csb). In winter, temperatures normally oscillate between −1 °C (30 °F) and 7 °C (45 °F). Frost is common in the early hours of the morning before the dawn during the coldest months of the winter, but normally melts after sunrise. Snowfalls are not rare in the city (9 days a year), however heavy snowfalls are not common. Summers are warm and relatively dry, with temperatures usually oscillating between 16 °C (61 °F) and 35 °C (95 °F). With about 2,673 sunshine hours, the city enjoys a considerable amount of sunshine throughout the year.

Climate data for León, Virgen del Camino 916 m asl (1991–2020), extremes (1938-present)
Month	Jan	Feb	Mar	Apr	May	Jun	Jul	Aug	Sep	Oct	Nov	Dec	Year
Record high °C (°F)	21.0 (69.8)	20.9 (69.6)	25.5 (77.9)	29.2 (84.6)	31.9 (89.4)	36.5 (97.7)	38.2 (100.8)	38.2 (100.8)	37.4 (99.3)	30.5 (86.9)	23.4 (74.1)	19.0 (66.2)	38.2 (100.8)
Mean daily maximum °C (°F)	7.3 (45.1)	9.7 (49.5)	13.3 (55.9)	15.3 (59.5)	19.3 (66.7)	24.3 (75.7)	27.4 (81.3)	27.1 (80.8)	22.9 (73.2)	17.1 (62.8)	11.2 (52.2)	8.2 (46.8)	16.9 (62.5)
Daily mean °C (°F)	3.3 (37.9)	4.7 (40.5)	7.6 (45.7)	9.5 (49.1)	13.0 (55.4)	17.3 (63.1)	19.8 (67.6)	19.7 (67.5)	16.3 (61.3)	11.9 (53.4)	6.9 (44.4)	4.2 (39.6)	11.2 (52.1)
Mean daily minimum °C (°F)	−0.7 (30.7)	−0.3 (31.5)	1.9 (35.4)	3.7 (38.7)	6.8 (44.2)	10.2 (50.4)	12.2 (54.0)	12.3 (54.1)	9.8 (49.6)	6.7 (44.1)	2.7 (36.9)	0.2 (32.4)	5.5 (41.8)
Record low °C (°F)	−17.4 (0.7)	−14.4 (6.1)	−11.2 (11.8)	−6.1 (21.0)	−4.0 (24.8)	0.0 (32.0)	3.0 (37.4)	2.6 (36.7)	0.0 (32.0)	−3.4 (25.9)	−7.2 (19.0)	−15.4 (4.3)	−17.4 (0.7)
Average precipitation mm (inches)	51.1 (2.01)	31.6 (1.24)	38.8 (1.53)	47.3 (1.86)	55.0 (2.17)	29.2 (1.15)	18.3 (0.72)	20.1 (0.79)	31.5 (1.24)	62.0 (2.44)	53.4 (2.10)	57.4 (2.26)	495.7 (19.51)
Average precipitation days (≥ 1 mm)	8.3	5.7	6.7	7.9	8.2	4.3	2.8	2.7	4.5	8.2	7.9	7.7	74.9
Average relative humidity (%)	82	72	66	64	60	54	50	51	60	72	80	83	66
Mean monthly sunshine hours	130	172	217	234	276	321	363	332	258	186	141	124	2,754
Source: Agencia Estatal de Meteorologia

Climate data for León, Virgen del Camino 916 m asl (1981-2010)
Month	Jan	Feb	Mar	Apr	May	Jun	Jul	Aug	Sep	Oct	Nov	Dec	Year
Record high °C (°F)	21.0 (69.8)	21.5 (70.7)	25.5 (77.9)	29.2 (84.6)	31.9 (89.4)	36.5 (97.7)	36.5 (97.7)	38.2 (100.8)	37.4 (99.3)	28.4 (83.1)	23.4 (74.1)	19.0 (66.2)	38.2 (100.8)
Mean daily maximum °C (°F)	7.1 (44.8)	9.5 (49.1)	13.3 (55.9)	14.8 (58.6)	18.6 (65.5)	24.0 (75.2)	27.4 (81.3)	26.9 (80.4)	22.9 (73.2)	16.7 (62.1)	11.2 (52.2)	8.0 (46.4)	16.7 (62.1)
Daily mean °C (°F)	3.2 (37.8)	4.7 (40.5)	7.6 (45.7)	9.0 (48.2)	12.6 (54.7)	17.1 (62.8)	19.8 (67.6)	19.6 (67.3)	16.5 (61.7)	11.7 (53.1)	7.0 (44.6)	4.3 (39.7)	11.1 (52.0)
Mean daily minimum °C (°F)	−0.7 (30.7)	0.0 (32.0)	1.9 (35.4)	3.3 (37.9)	6.6 (43.9)	10.2 (50.4)	12.2 (54.0)	12.3 (54.1)	10.1 (50.2)	6.7 (44.1)	2.8 (37.0)	0.4 (32.7)	5.5 (41.9)
Record low °C (°F)	−17.4 (0.7)	−14.4 (6.1)	−11.2 (11.8)	−6.1 (21.0)	−4.0 (24.8)	0.0 (32.0)	3.0 (37.4)	2.6 (36.7)	0.0 (32.0)	−3.4 (25.9)	−7.2 (19.0)	−15.4 (4.3)	−17.4 (0.7)
Average precipitation mm (inches)	50 (2.0)	34 (1.3)	32 (1.3)	45 (1.8)	56 (2.2)	31 (1.2)	19 (0.7)	23 (0.9)	39 (1.5)	61 (2.4)	59 (2.3)	66 (2.6)	515 (20.3)
Average precipitation days	8	6	6	8	9	5	3	3	5	8	8	9	75
Average snowy days	4	3	2	1	0	0	0	0	0	0	1	2	13
Average relative humidity (%)	82	74	66	65	62	56	52	54	62	74	80	83	67
Mean monthly sunshine hours	130	161	214	228	259	314	358	327	246	178	137	120	2,673
Source: Agencia Estatal de Meteorología

== Demographics ==
Historical population (current boundaries since 1877)
Year	Pop.	±%
1842	7,074	—
1857	10,040	+41.9%
1877	12,734	+26.8%
1887	14,957	+17.5%
1900	18,191	+21.6%
1910	20,555	+13.0%
1920	23,675	+15.2%
1930	30,989	+30.9%
1940	45,531	+46.9%
1950	63,706	+39.9%
1960	77,583	+21.8%
1970	105,243	+35.7%
1981	127,095	+20.8%
1991	144,021	+13.3%
2001	130,916	−9.1%
2011	131,411	+0.4%
2021	122,398	−6.9%
Source: INE

As of 2024, the population of León is 122,866, of whom 45.4% are male and 54.6% are female, compared to the nationwide average of 49.0% and 51.0% respectively. People under 16 years old make up 11.9% of the population, and people over 65 years old make up 28.6%, compared to the nationwide average of 14.3% and 20.4% respectively.

As of 2024, the foreign-born population is 14,549, equal to 11.8% of the total population. The 5 largest foreign nationalities are Colombians (2,196), Moroccans (1,952), Dominicans (1,320), Venezuelans (1,205) and Romanians (616).

Foreign population by country of birth (2024)
Country	Population
Colombia	2,196
Morocco	1,952
Dominican Republic	1,320
Venezuela	1,205
Romania	616
Argentina	483
Peru	464
Brazil	437
France	425
Ecuador	397
Cuba	348
Ukraine	319
Mexico	312
China	257
Portugal	256

== Culture ==
=== Holy Week ===
Leonese customs include the Semana Santa ("Holy Week"), featuring numerous processions through the centre of the city. One of them is the so-called "Procession of the Meeting", which acts out the meeting of three groups representing Saint John, the Virgin Mary and Christ, in the esplanade in front of the old council.

Holy Week processions in León are also very popular, with more than 15,000 penitents (called papones, in Leonese language) on the streets. Processions begin on "Viernes de Dolores" (the Friday in the week before Holy Week) and last until Easter Sunday. The most solemn and famous procession is the "Procesion de los Pasos", also known as the "Procesion del Encuentro" (Procession of the Meeting). During this nine-hour marathon procession, about 4,000 penitents carry thirteen "pasos" around all the city. The most solemn moment is El Encuentro (The Meeting) when the pasos representing Saint John and La Dolorosa face one to the other and are "bailados" (penitents move the paso as if Saint John and La Dolorosa were dancing).

The Holy Week in Leon was declared of International Tourist Interest in 2002.

=== Burial of Genarín ===
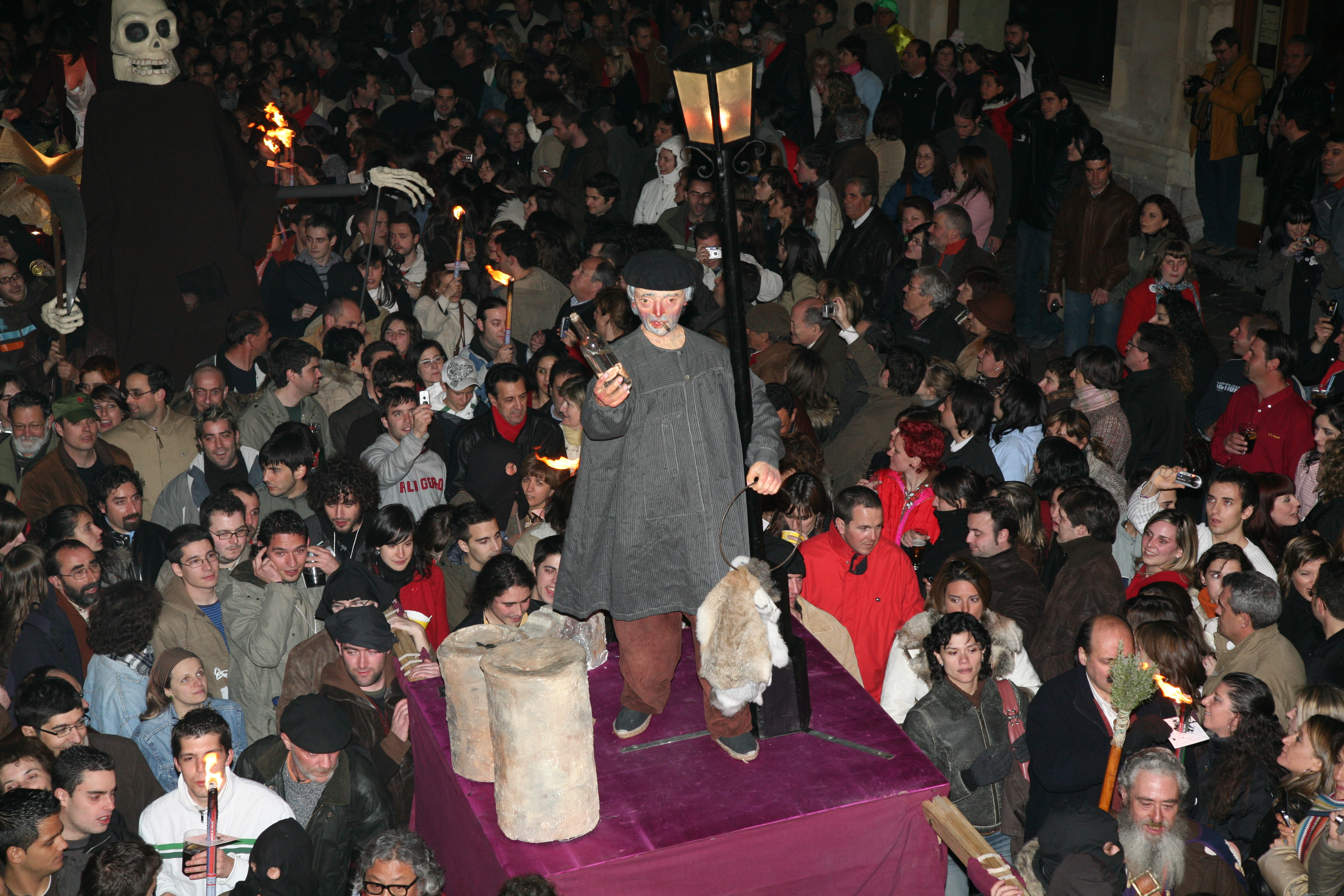
The burial of Genarín, a satyrical procession remembering the death of a furrier in 1929.

Associated with Semana Santa is the procession called The Burial of Genarín. Genarín was an alcoholic beggar who was hit and killed by the first garbage truck in the city of León in the year 1929. This is a celebration of alcohol, and the main purpose of the people who attend it is getting drunk in honor to the alcoholic beggar.

=== San Juan and San Pedro ===
The San Juan and San Pedro festivities are also remarkable, celebrated during the last week of June (between June 23 and June 29). During these days several concerts and festivals take place and the whole city is occupied by terraces and street markets where Leonese people celebrate the beginning of the summer, especially on San Juan's night (June 23) when fireworks and bonfires take place.

=== Leonese language ===
The local government and associations like the Asociación Cultural de la Llingua Llïonesa El Fueyu have promoted knowledge and use of the Leonese language.

In 2001, the University of León created a course for Teachers of the Leonese language, and local government developed Leonese language courses for adults. In 2007, the local government joined the celebration of the Day of the Leonese Language for the first time. The Leonese Language Teachers and Monitors Association (Asociación de Profesores y Monitores de Llingua Llïonesa) was created in 2008 and promotes Leonese language activities.

Leonese lessons in schools started in 2008, and it is currently taught in sixteen schools in León city in 2008–2009, promoted by the Leonese Local Government Department for Education. This course is for pupils in their 5th and 6th year of primary school (11- and 12-year-olds), where Leonese language is taught with Leonese culture.

More than one hundred people are studying Leonese in adult classes in 2008–2009. There are five levels for adults in the official courses developed by the Department for Leonese Culture of the Leonese City Council.

=== Cuisine ===
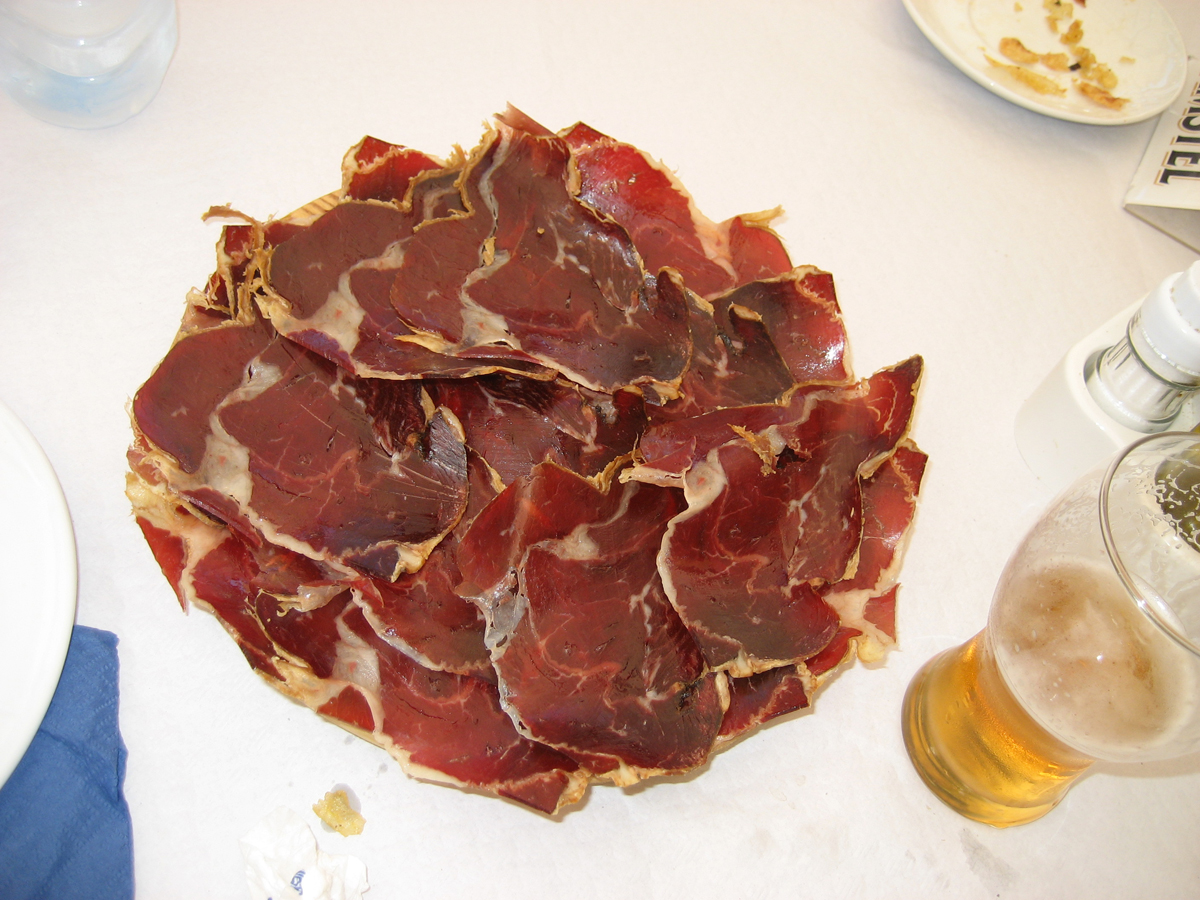
Cecina: Leonese traditional food

Within the wide range of Leonese cuisine the following dishes are the most representative: cecina (cured, smoked beef meat), morcilla (a blood sausage), botillo (a dish of meat-stuffed pork intestine), garlic soup, el cocido leonés (a mix of meat with vegetables and chickpeas, served after a vegetable-vermicelli soup) and mantecadas (pastry). Another very important part of the gastronomy of León are the tapas, which are usually given free with drinks, unlike in the rest of Spain. It is very common to go "de tapas" or "tapear" i.e. to go for a few drinks ("un corto", which is a very small beer, "una caña", which is roughly half a pint of beer or "un vino", a glass of wine, or a “butano”, a small glass of orange soda) just before lunch but more normally as a light form of dinner.

== Main sights ==
=== Churches ===
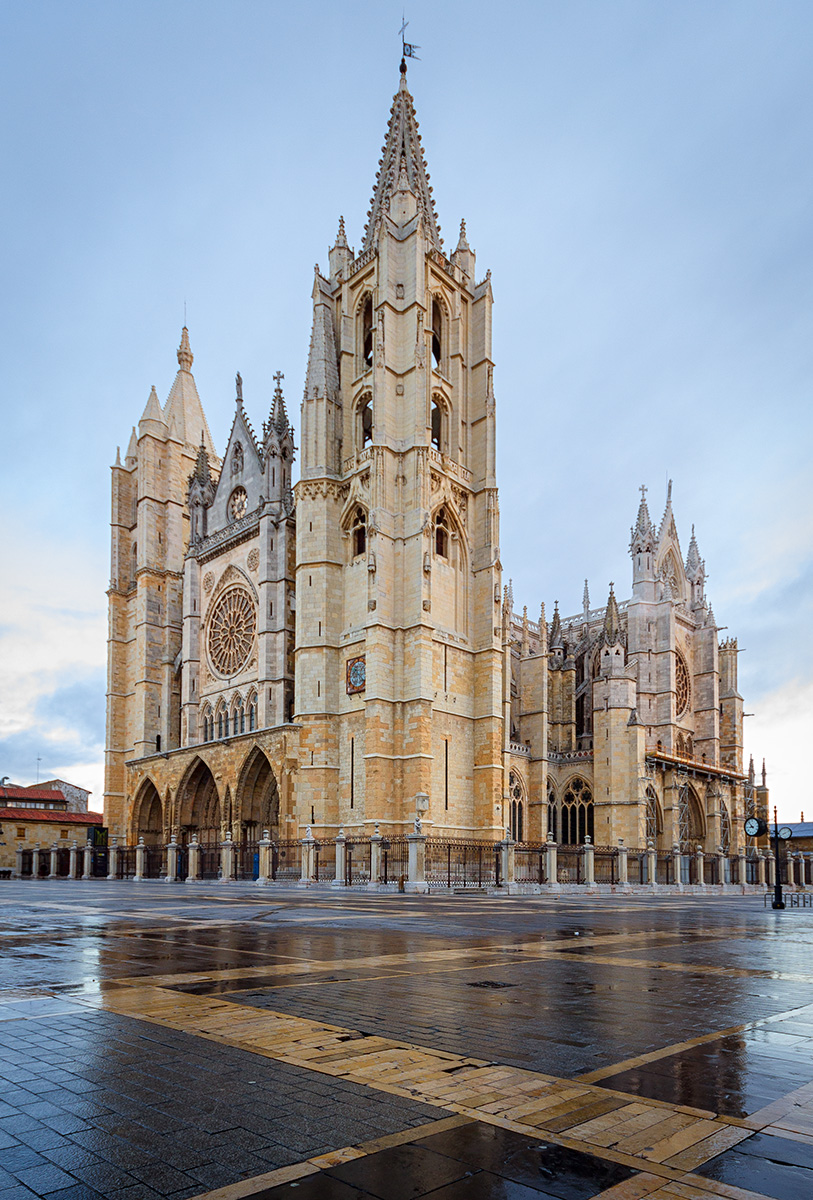
The León Cathedral

- León Cathedral, a rayonnant gothic building. It is one of the most relevant examples of the Gothic style in Spain, almost all of it built from 1205 to 1301. It contains one of the most extensive and best preserved collections of medieval stained glass in Europe, with at least 1,764 square meters of surface, most of it containing the original windows.
- Basilica of San Isidoro, a highlight of Romanesque architecture in Spain. Built during the 11th and 12th centuries AD, the complex includes a subterranean Royal Pantheon with 12th century painted murals in an exceptional state of preservation.
- Convent of San Marcos (currently a luxurious Parador) built from the 16th century AD to the 18th. Its most striking feature is a highly ornamental plateresque façade.
- Church of San Salvador de Palat del Rey, the most ancient in the city (10th century), however with few remains of the original Pre-Romanesque building. As the name (meaning church of the "Holy Savior of the King's Palace") suggests, it once acted as royal chapel.
- Church of Nuestra Señora del Merdado, from the 11th century.
- Church of San Francisco, an active Catholic church, completed in 1791.
- Church of San Juan y San Pedro de Renueva, dating to 1944–1970, but including an 18th-century Baroque façade taken from the ruined monastery of San Pedro de Eslonza, located about 22 km (14 mi) outside the city.

=== Other historical buildings ===
- Roman Walls, built in the 1st century BC and enlarged in the 3rd and 4th centuries AD. Long sections in the Eastern and Northern sides are preserved, as well as less complete parts in the Western side and some remains surrounded by other buildings in the Southern side. Some sections of a medieval wall built in the 13th and 14th centuries AD also exist in the Southern side. The wall can be visited in specific locations.
- Casa Botines, a neogothic styled building designed by Antoni Gaudí and built in 1891-1892 (one of the three Gaudí buildings outside Catalonia).
- Palacio de los Guzmanes, the site of the provincial diputación (parliament). It contains a patio in the plateresque style by Gil de Hontañón.

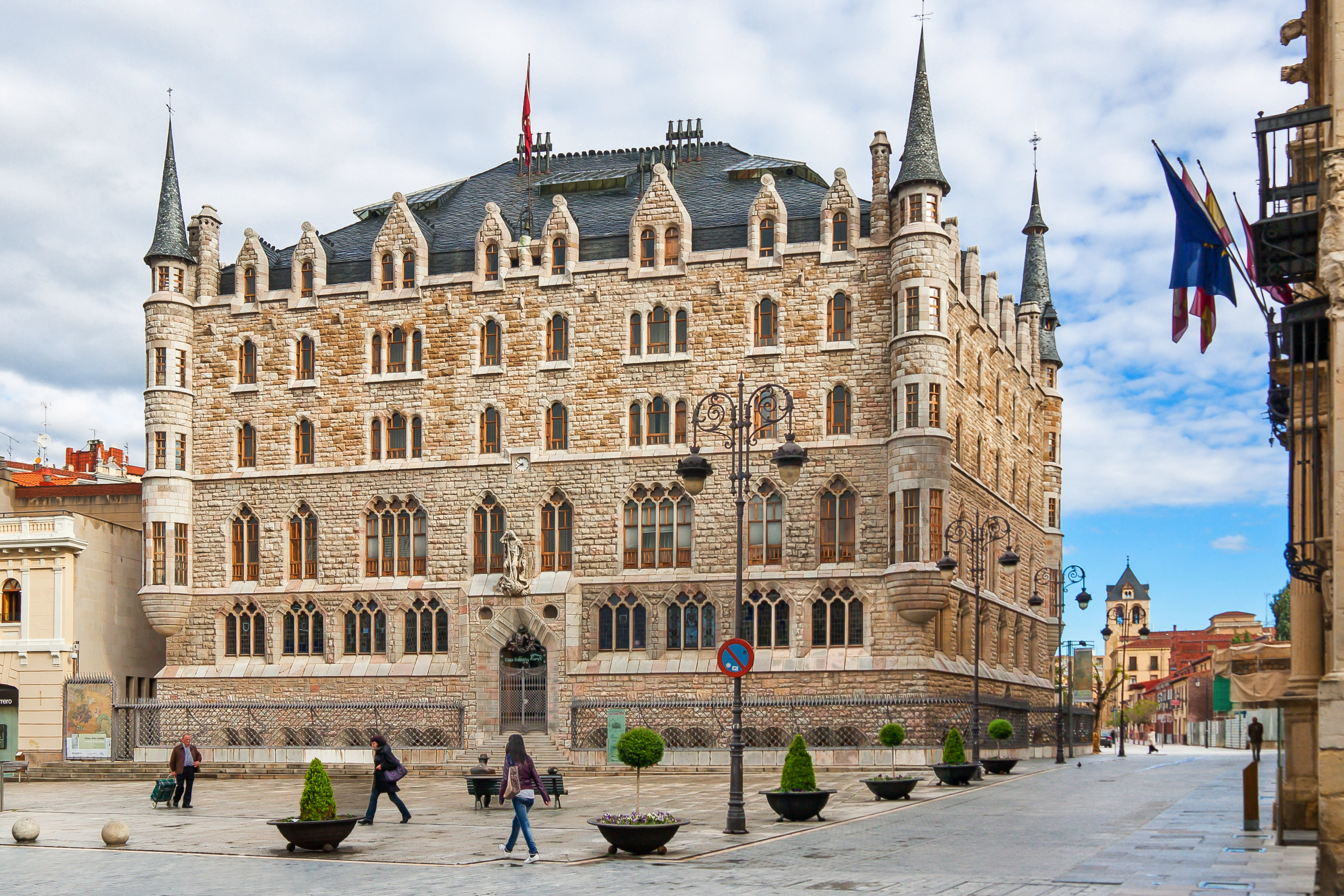
Casa de los Botines was built by Antoni Gaudí.

- Palacio del Conde Luna (14th century).
- Palacio de los Marqueses de Prado, a 17th-century Baroque building, currently the Hospital Nuestra Señora de Regla.

=== Museums ===
- MUSAC. It is a contemporary art museum which opened in 2005. Its design by the architectural studio Mansilla+Tuñón was awarded with the 2007 European Union Prize for Contemporary Architecture. One of the building's most distinctive features is its façade formed out of thousands of large multicolored stained-glass panels. Close to the museum is the León Auditorium, also projected by Mansilla+Tuñón, which has an equally striking presence of crisp white cubes perforated by irregularly set windows.
- Museo de León, which contains a collection of prehistorical tools and art from the Roman, Medieval and Modern periods.
- Museo Sierra-Pambley, a house from the Age of Enlightenment

=== Other areas and sights ===
- Plaza Mayor (main square).
- Plaza del Grano.
- Barrio Húmedo (the drinking and partying area).
- University of León.
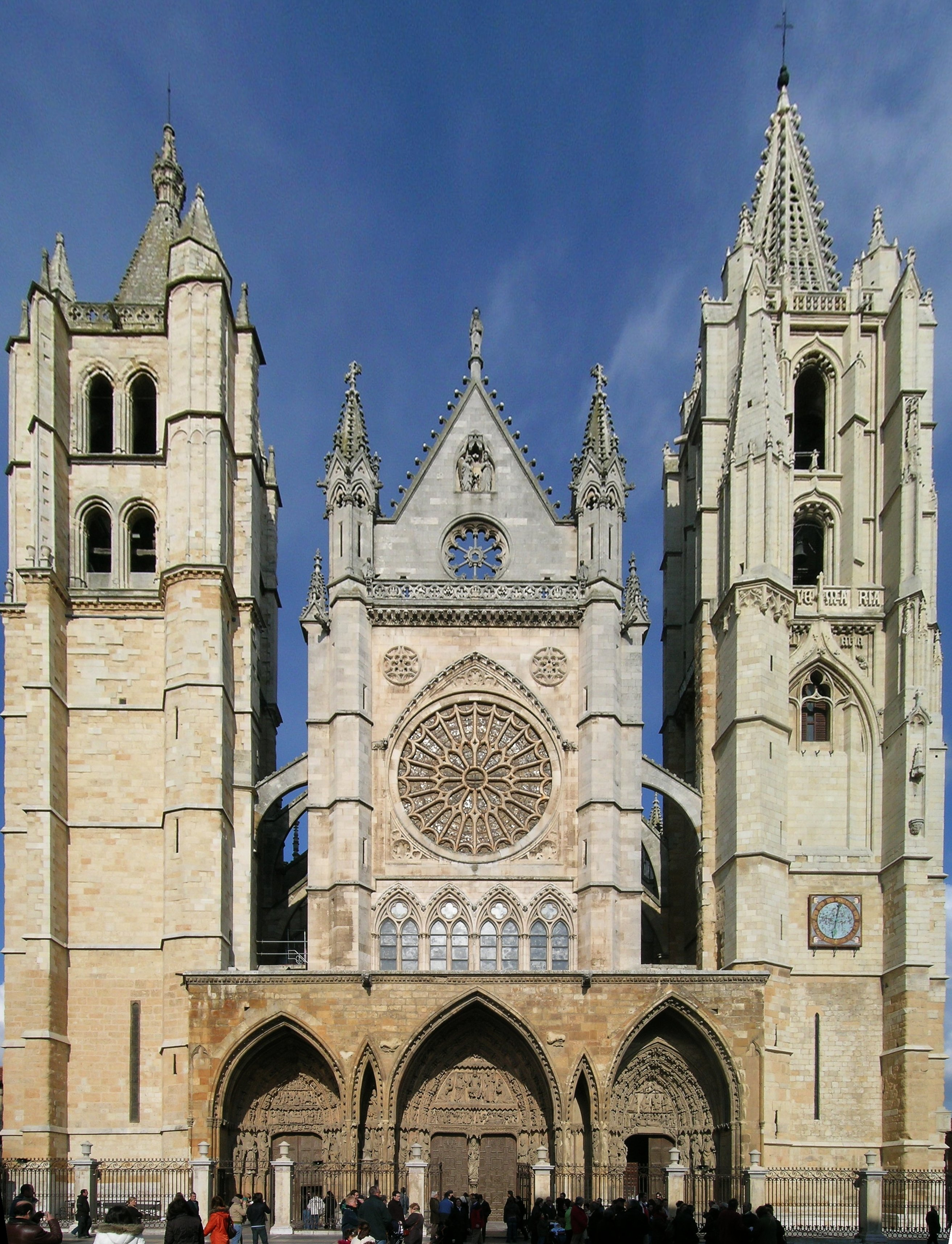
León Cathedral, main facade

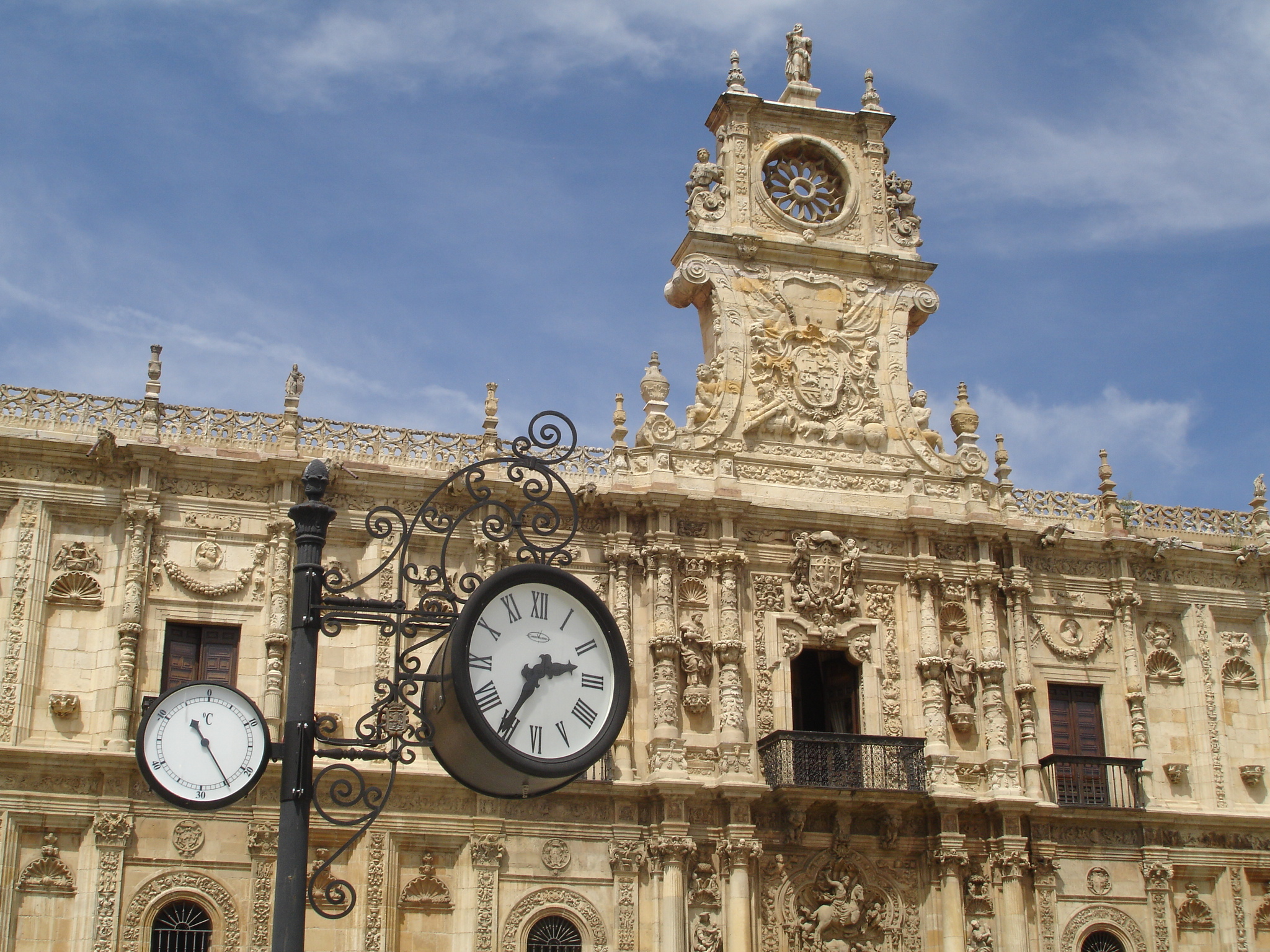
Hostal de San Marcos

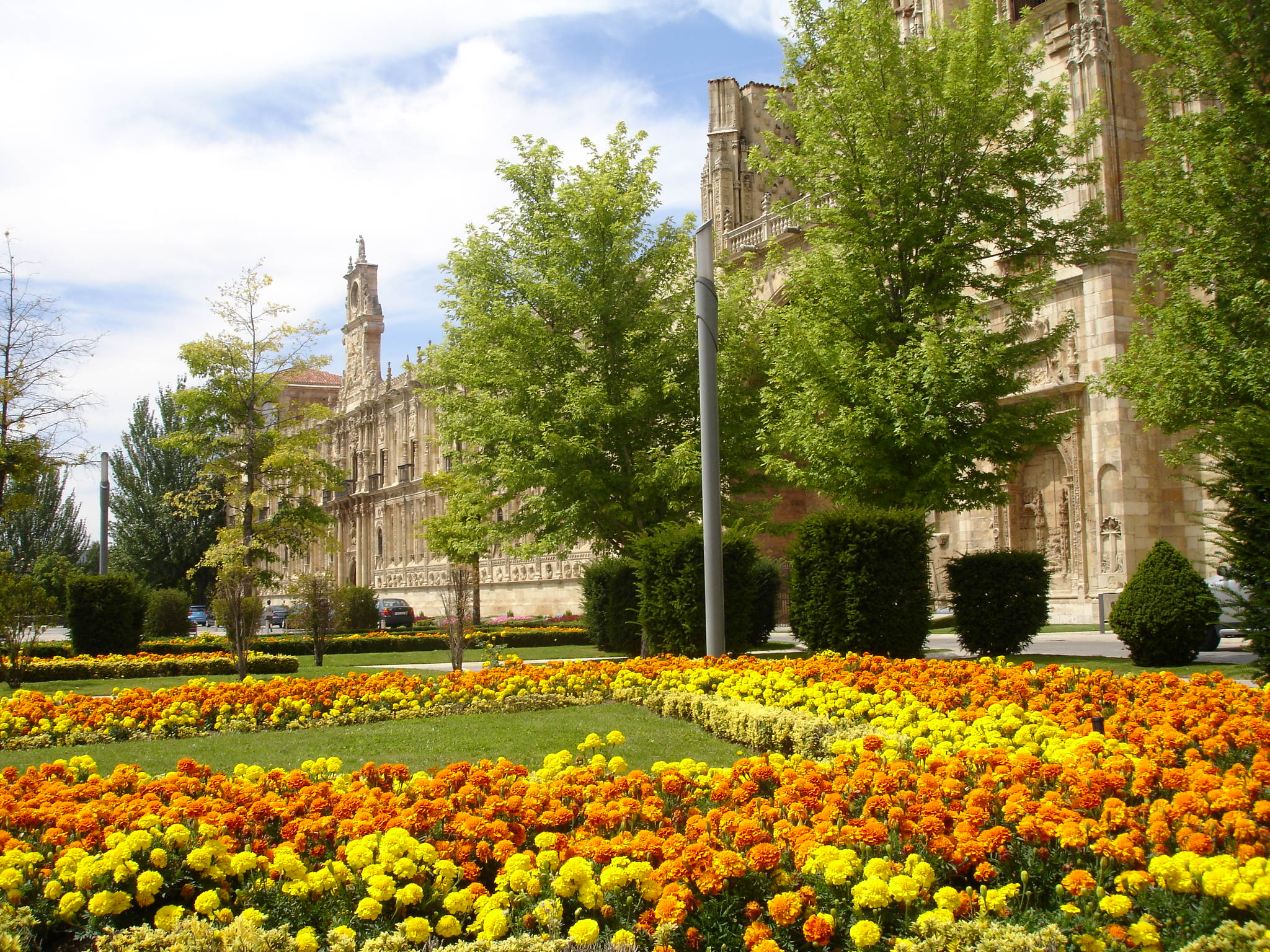
Gardens of Plaza de San Marcos

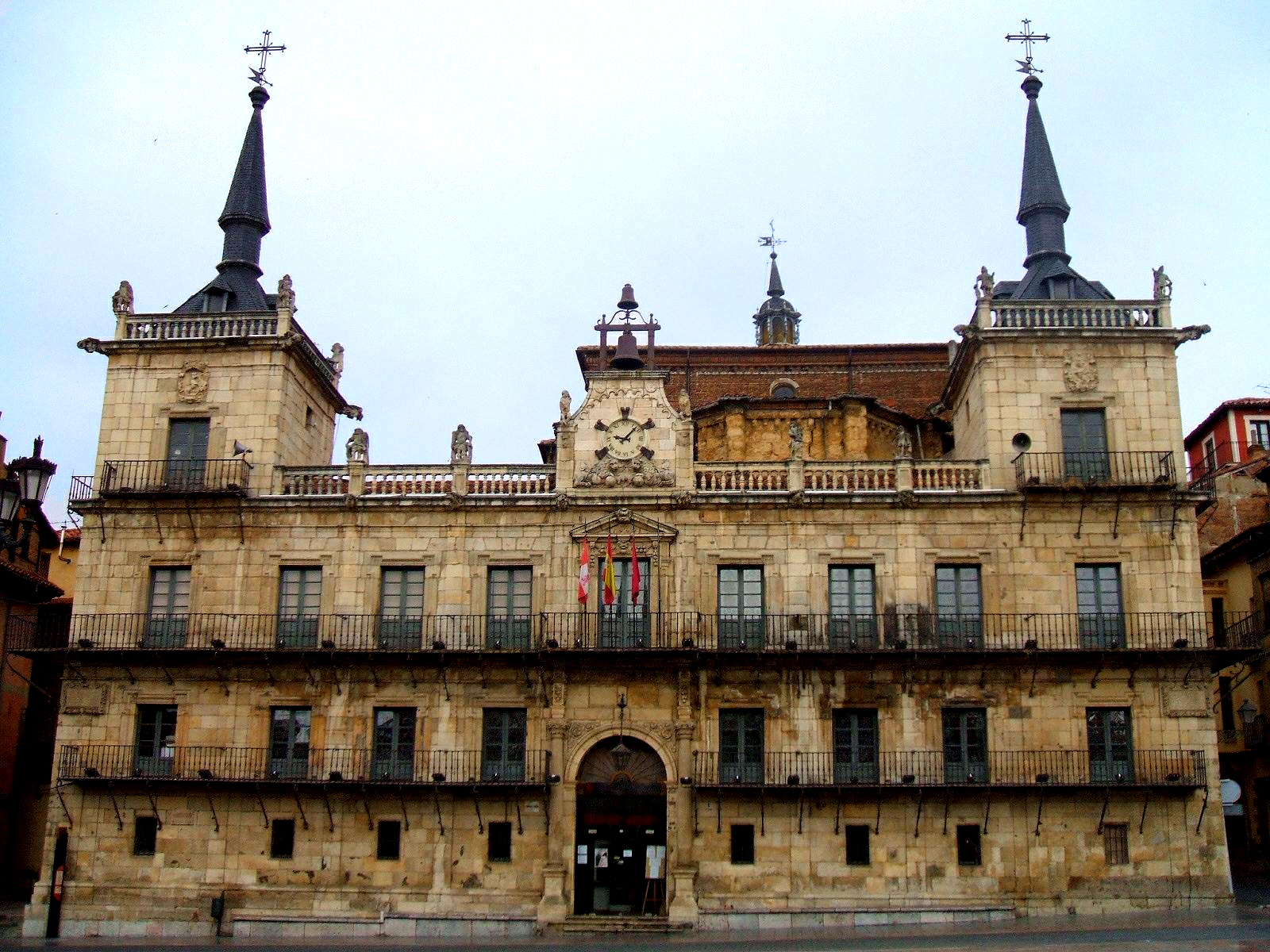
Former city hall

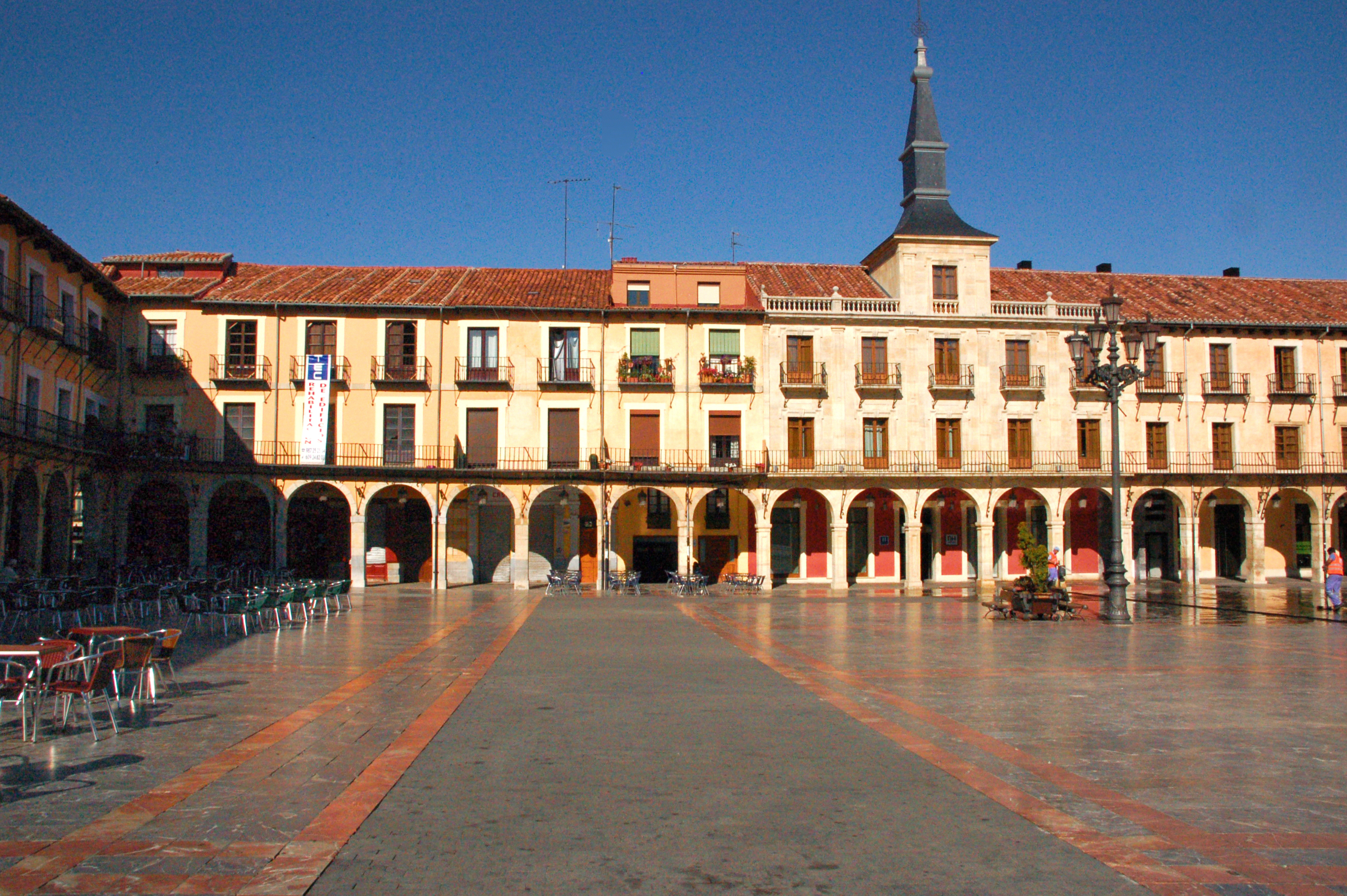
Plaza mayor

== Transport ==
=== Airport ===
León Airport (IATA: LEN) is located approximately 6 kilometres away from the city centre, in the neighbouring town of La Virgen del Camino/Valverde de la Virgen. It offers mostly domestic flights within the country. Currently two Spanish airlines operate in it: Iberia/Air Nostrum and Air Europa. Air Nostrum offers flights from and to Barcelona. During the summer months the number of available destinations increases, and flights are also offered from and to Palma de Mallorca, Tenerife, Ibiza, Menorca, Málaga and Gran Canaria.

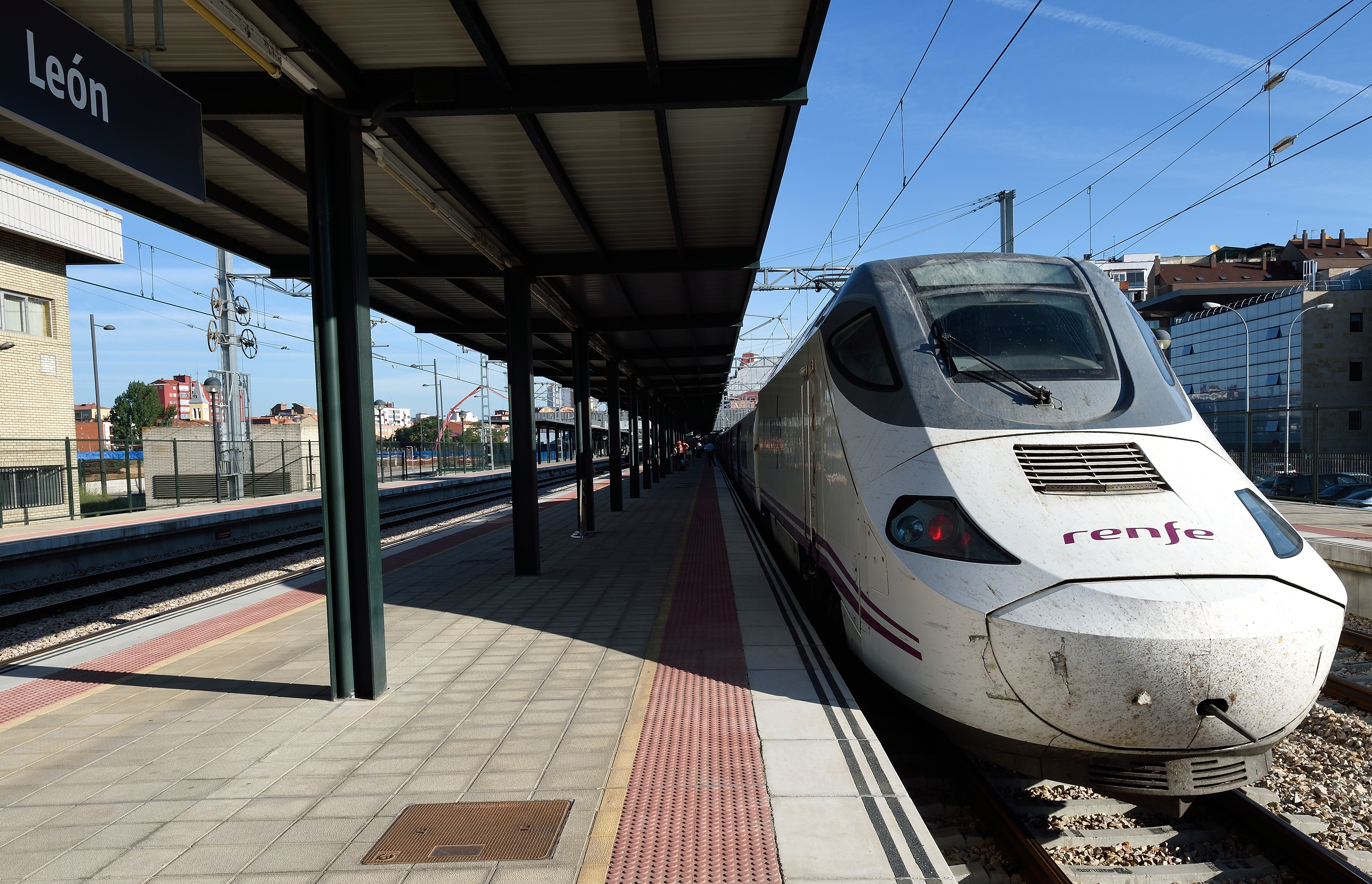
Alvia high-speed train in León

=== Railway stations ===
León has two railway stations: the León railway station, for long distance, and León-Matallana, for commuter rail and tram. There are high-speed services that connect León to Madrid in approximately two hours. Other destinations directly reachable from León are Galicia (to the West), Asturias (to the North) and Valladolid (to the South-East, in the same route as Madrid).

=== Public transport ===
León has 13 city bus lines, belonging to the company Alesa, a subsidiary of ALSA. Besides, there is a commuter rail towards the northeast of the province that becomes a tram when it enter the city.

== Government ==
The Leonese City Council was founded in 1345. It has 27 city councillors.

In the last municipal elections (26 May 2019) the results were:

- Spanish Socialist Workers Party (Partido Socialista Obrero Español, PSOE) - 30.31% of the votes and 10 councillors
- Partido Popular - 29.61% votes and 9 councillors
- Ciudadanos - 13.98% and 4 councillors
- Unión del Pueblo Leonés - 9.42% and 3 councillors
- Podemos-Equo - 5.35% and 1 councillor

The mayor is José Antonio Diez, from the PSOE.

León is in the county (comarca) of Tierras de León.

== Twin towns – sister cities ==
León is twinned with:

- Baeza, Spain
- Bragança, Portugal
- Chartres, France
- León, Mexico
- Porto, Portugal
- Puebla, Mexico
- Viseu, Portugal
- Voronezh, Russia
- Xiangtan, China

== Notable people ==
- Mario Amilivia (born 1957), mayor
- Miguel Castaño (1883–1936), first democratically elected mayor
- Carlos D. Cidon (1959–2009), chef and author
- Buenaventura Durruti (1896–1936), anarchist revolutionary
- Pedro Durruti (1911–1937), Falangist activist
- Santiago Durruti (d. 1931), trade unionist and politician
- Moses de León (1240–1305), rabbi, kabbalist, author of the Zohar
- Dolores Gortázar Serantes (1872–1936), novelist
- Manuel Martínez (born 1974), shot putter
- Carolina Rodríguez (born 1986), rhythmic gymnast
- David Vidales (born 2002), racing driver
- José Luis Rodríguez Zapatero (born 1960), prime minister of Spain (2004–2011)
- Emilio Zapico (1944–1996), racing driver

== Gallery ==
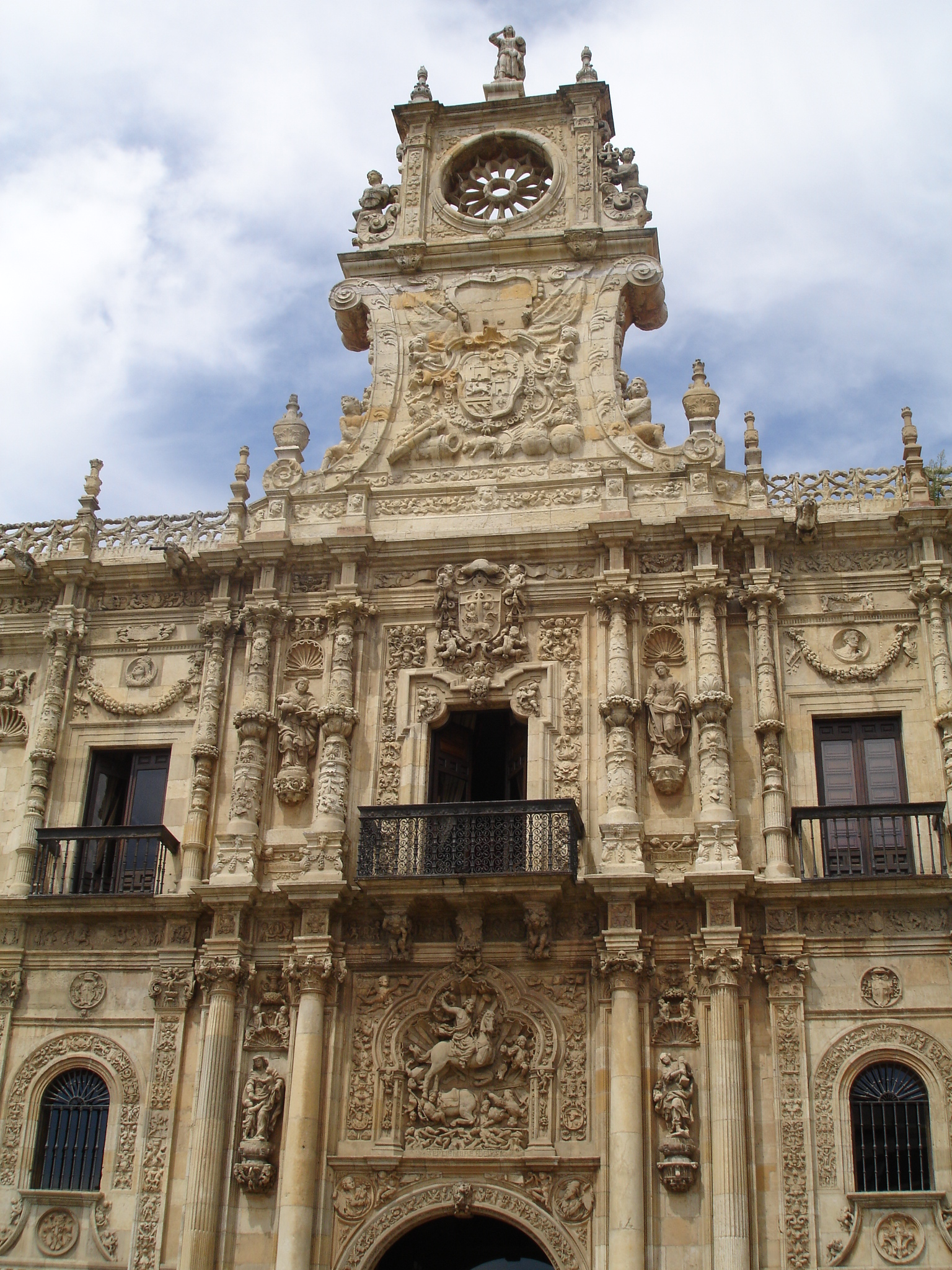
Facade of Convento de San Marcos.

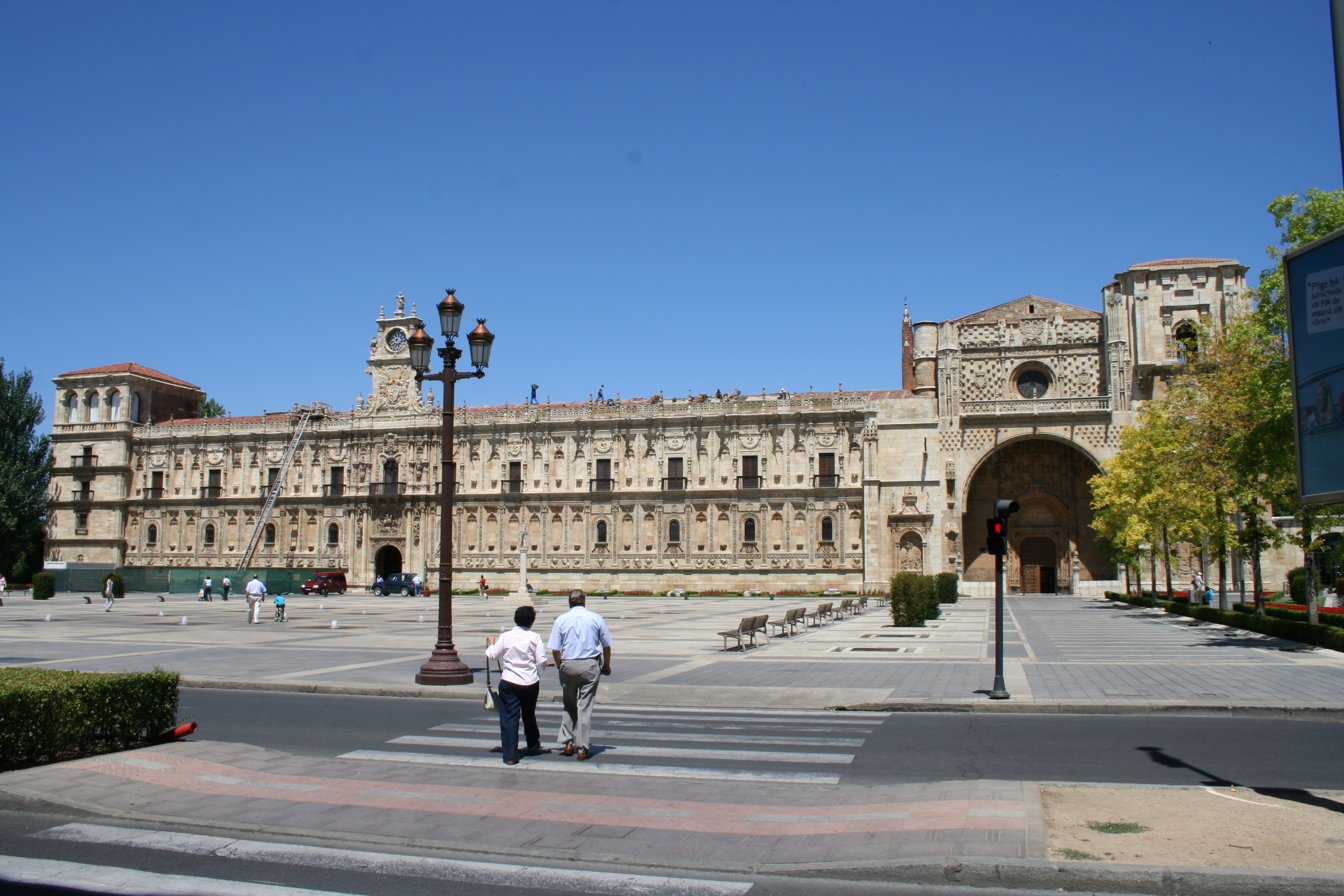
Hostal de San Marcos

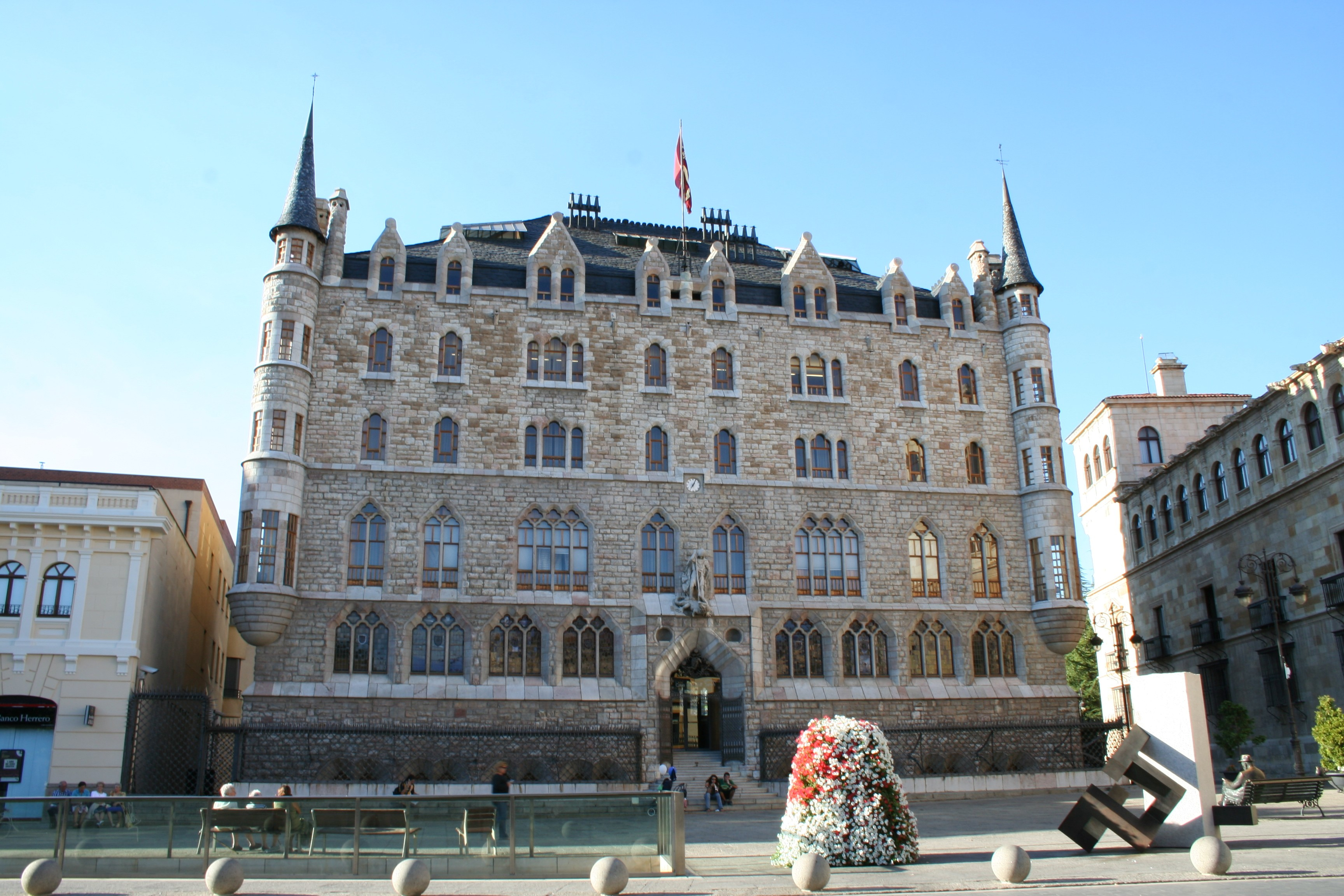
Casa de los Botines.

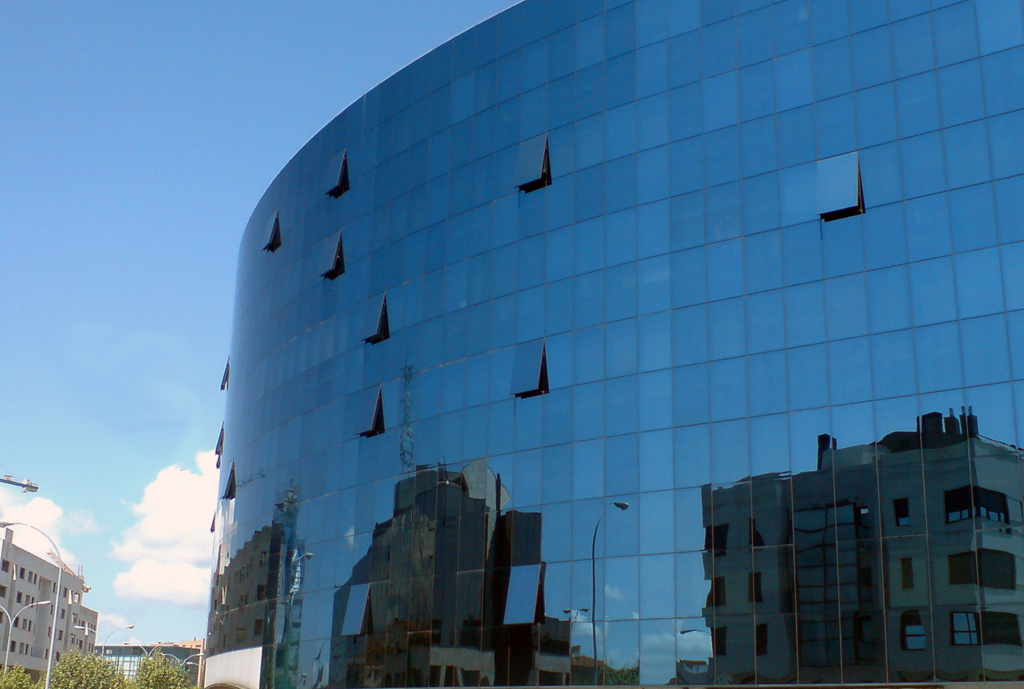
The Europa Building.

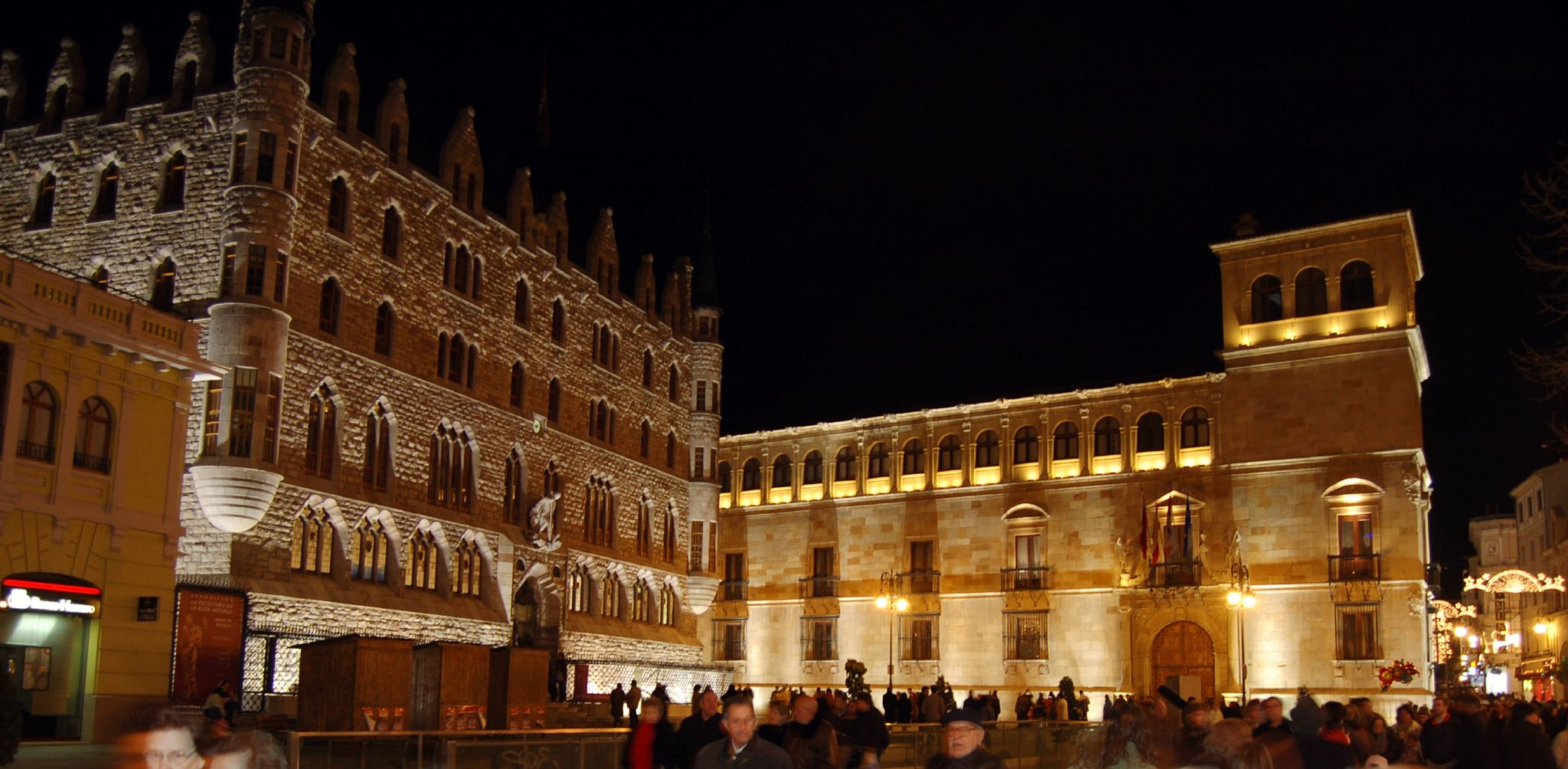
Palacio de los Guzmanes.

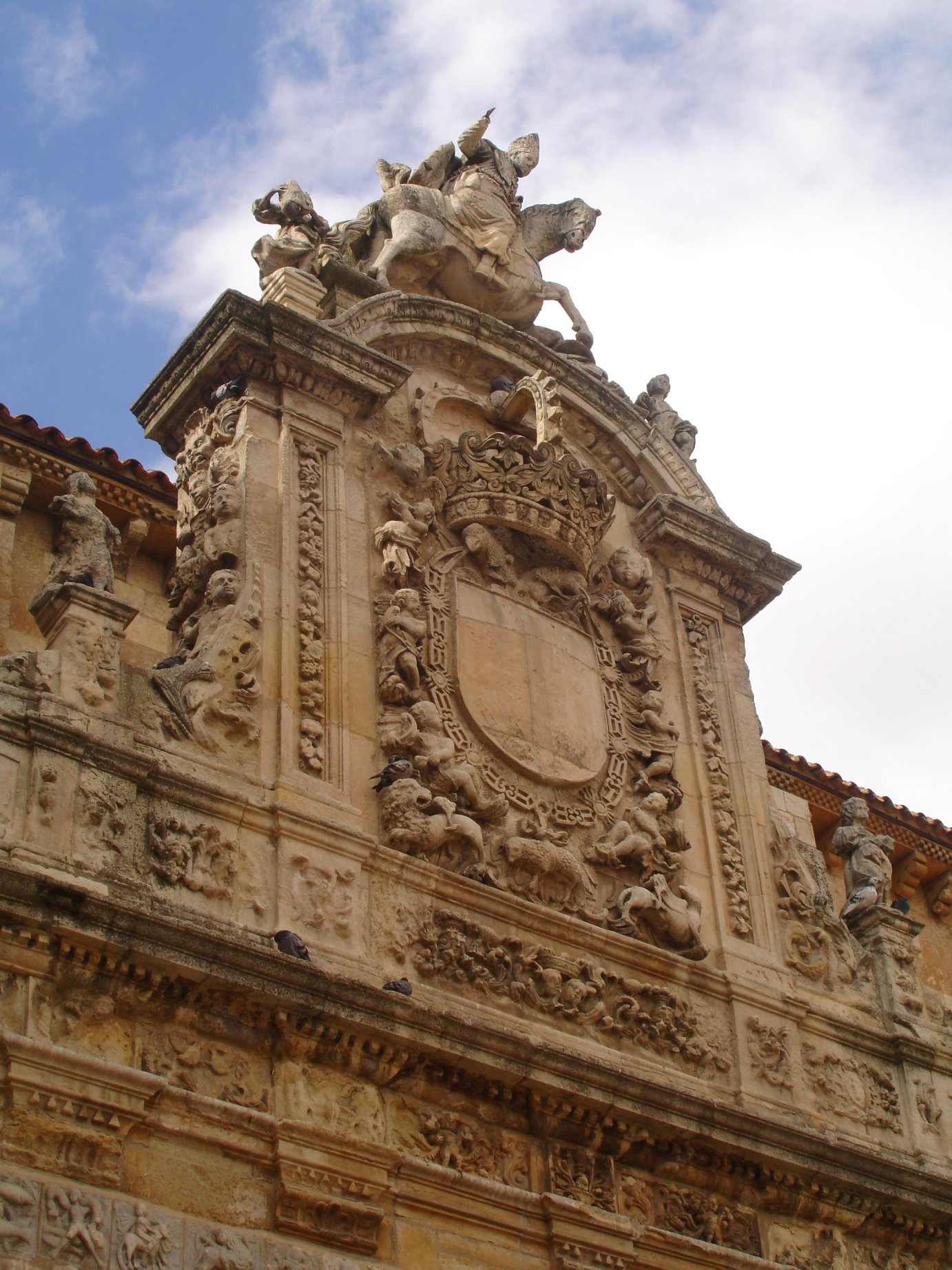
Principal façade of the Real Basílica de San Isidoro.

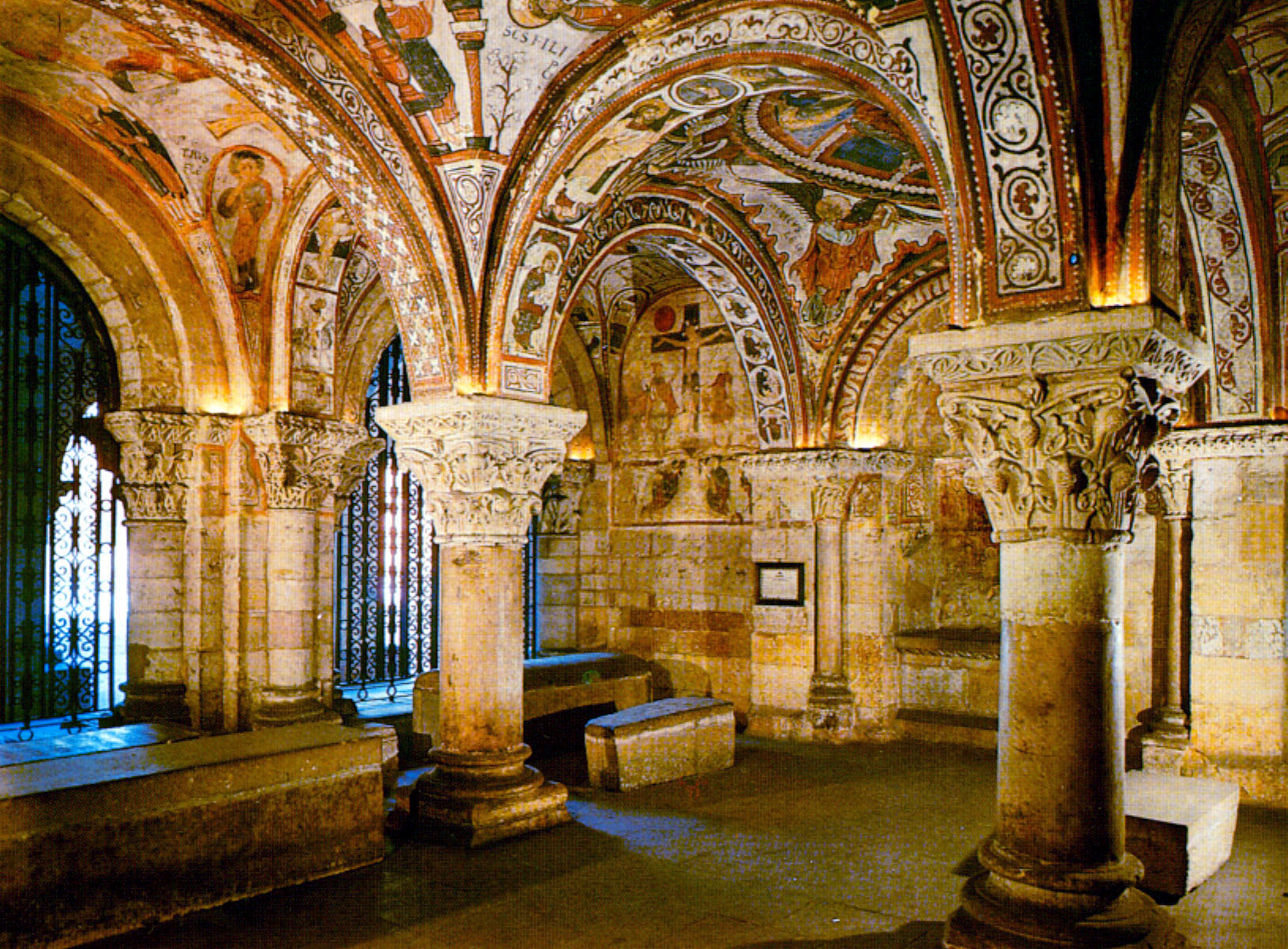
Panteón de los Reyes of Real Basílica de San Isidoro.

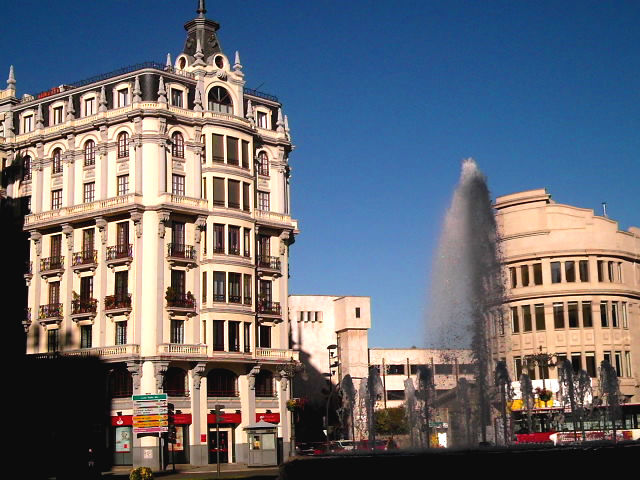
Plaza de Santo Domingo.

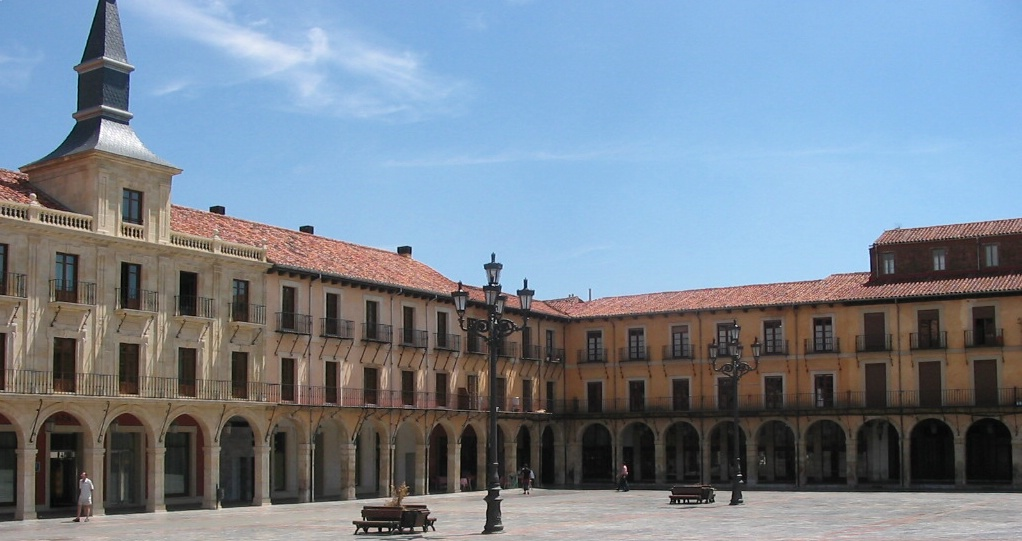
La Plaza Mayor.

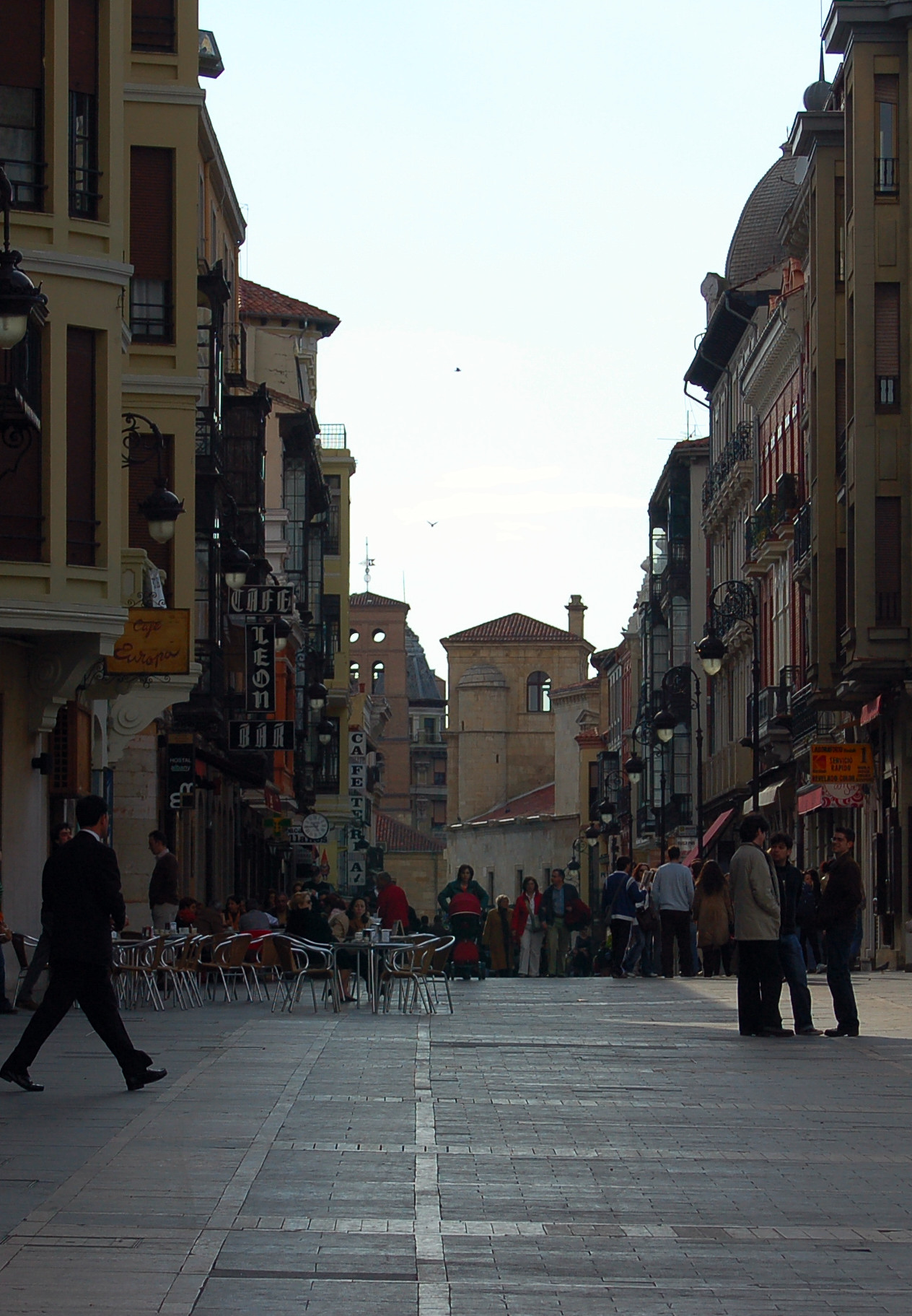
Calle Ancha de León.

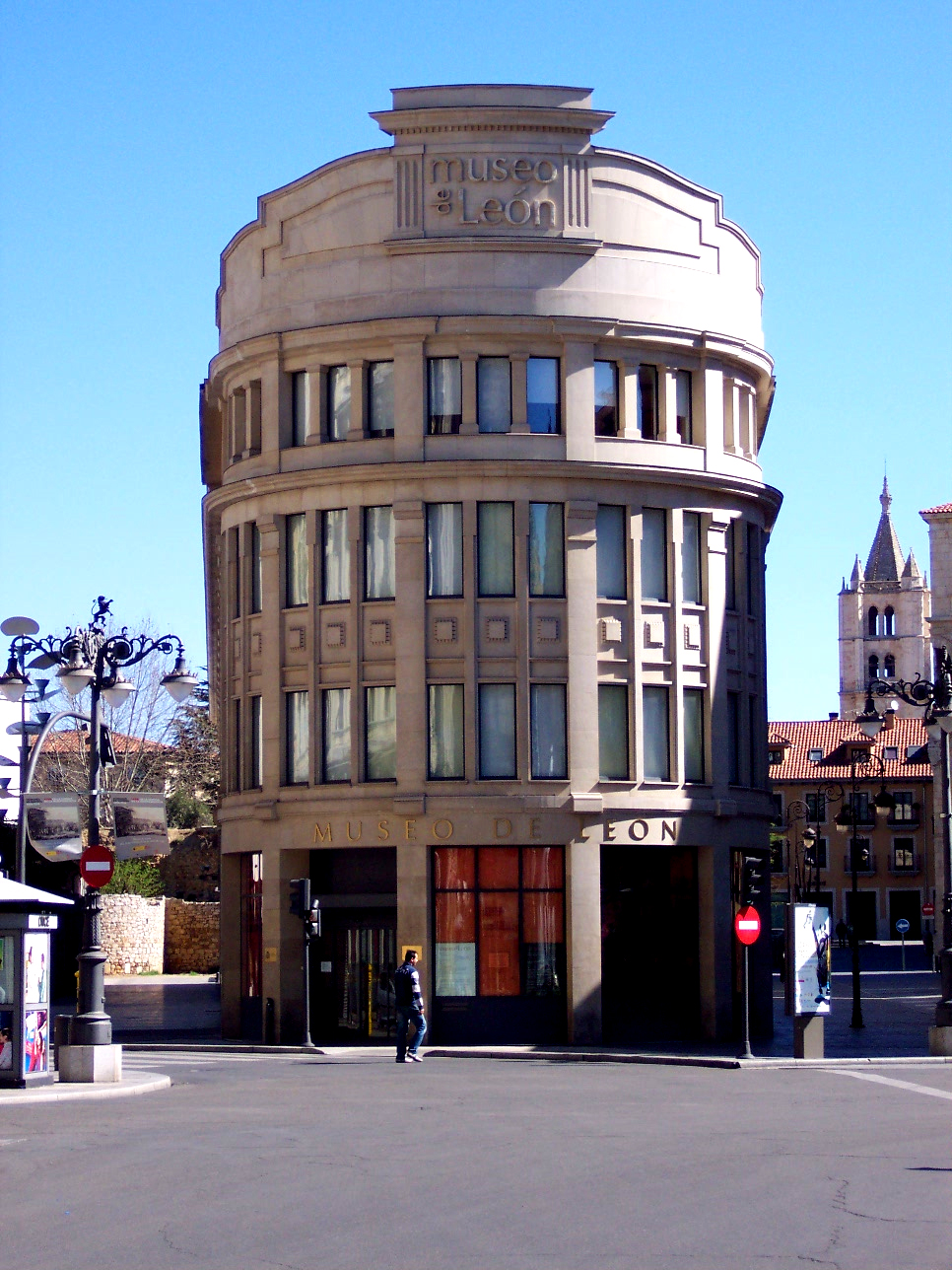
León Museum.

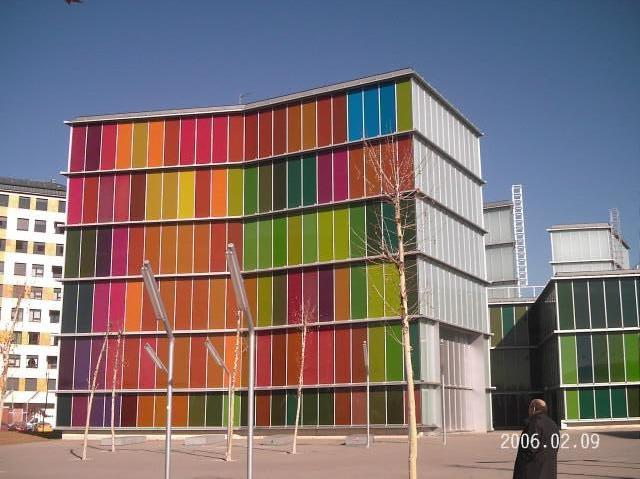
Museo de Arte Contemporáneo de Castilla y León.

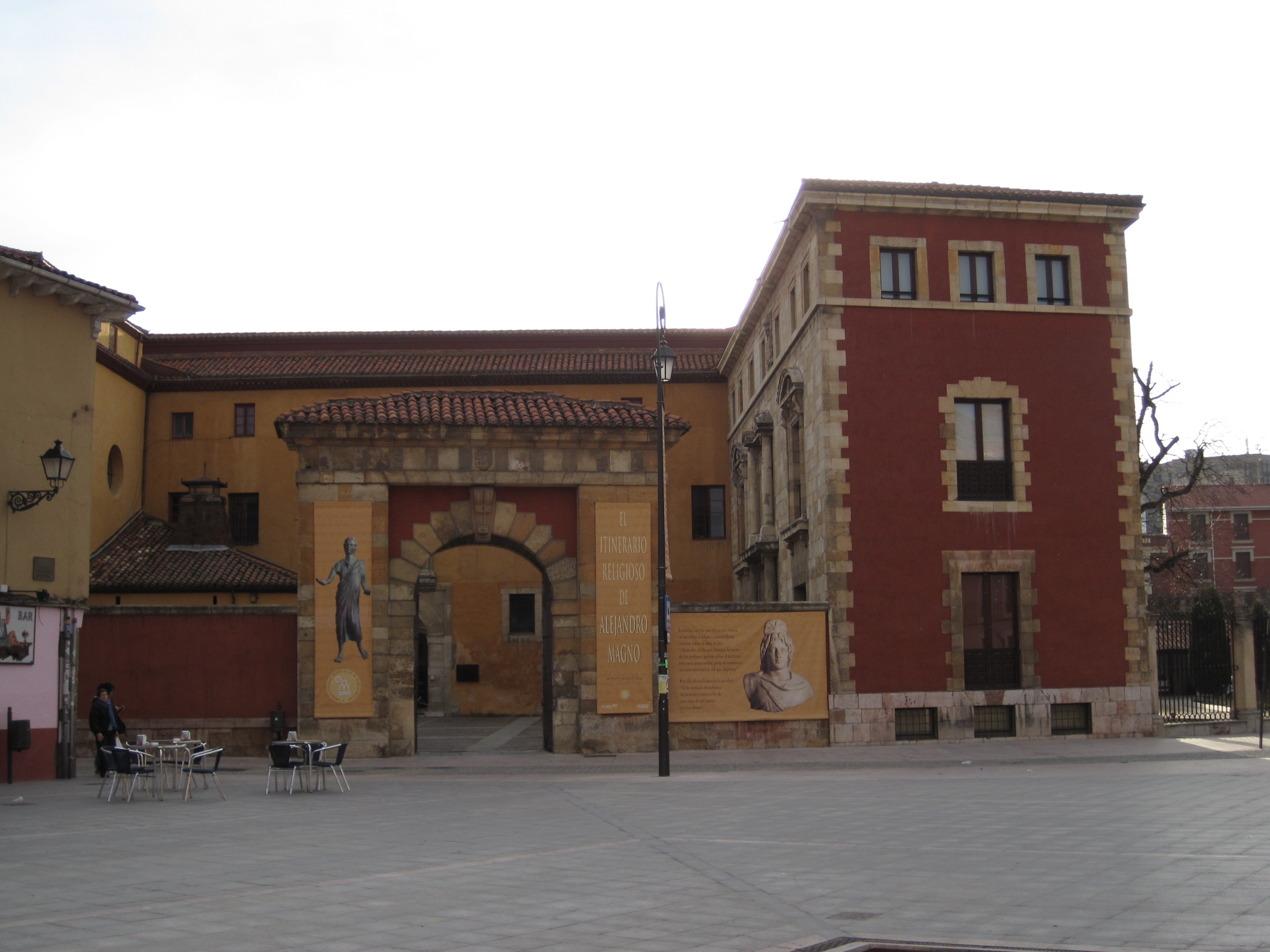
Biblical and eastern Museum.

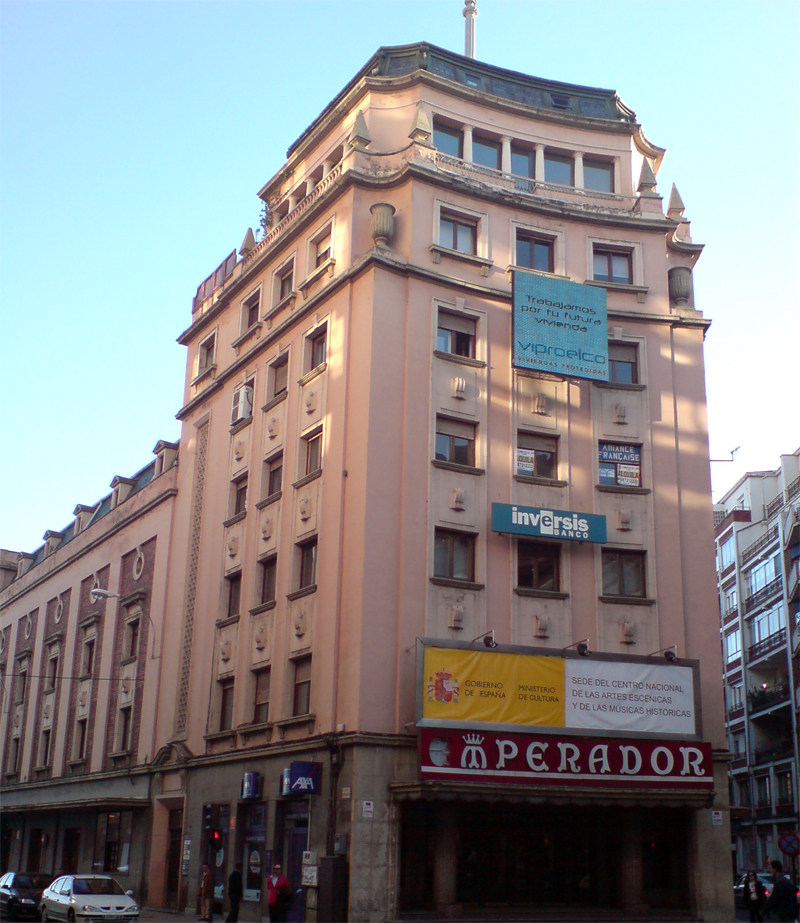
Emperador Theatre.

== See also ==
- List of municipalities in León
- Himno a León
