= Death and funeral of Buenaventura Durruti =

1936 events of the Spanish Civil War

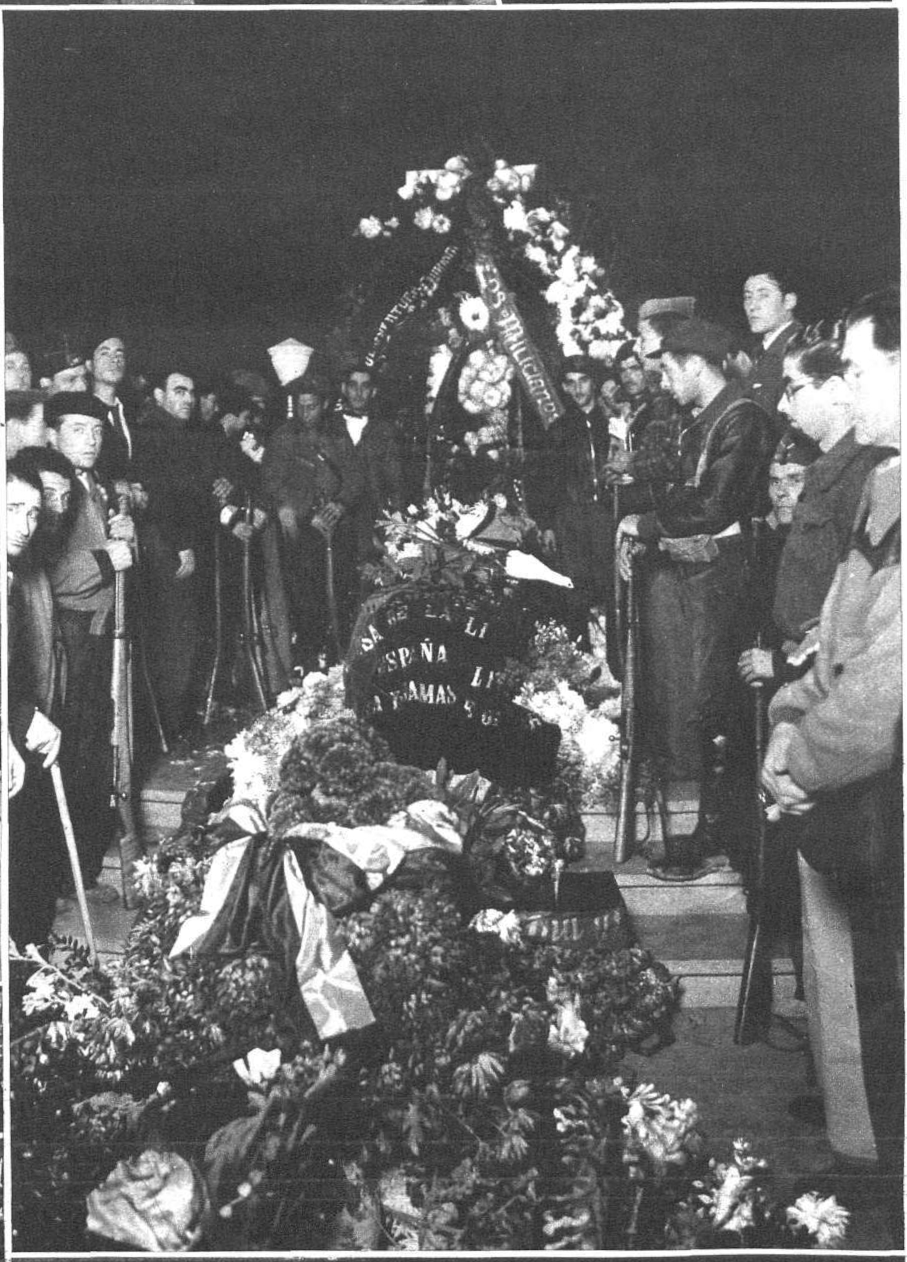
- Durruti's body lying in state at Via Laietana
- Date: 19 November 1936, 14:30 (GMT) (shooting); 20 November 1936, 04:00 (GMT) (death); 23–24 November 1936 (funeral)
- Location: University City of Madrid (shooting); Hotel Ritz Madrid (death); Barcelona (funeral); 40.4436°N 3.7185°W (shooting); 40.4156°N 3.6928°W (death); 41.35403°N 2.15017°E (burial)
- Motive: Unclear: War (official narrative); Sectarianism (anarchist narrative); Insubordination (communist narrative); None (accident narrative)
- Perpetrators: Unclear: Nationalists (official narrative); Communists (anarchist narrative); Anarchists (communist narrative); Himself (accident narrative)
- Burial: Montjuïc Cemetery

Buenaventura Durruti, a Spanish anarchist revolutionary and leader of the confederal militias during the Spanish Civil War, was fatally shot on 19 November 1936 during the battle of Ciudad Universitaria and died the following day, at the age of 40.

At that time, the situation on the frontlines had deteriorated, with fierce fighting between the Nationalists and the Durruti Column over the University City's Hospital Clinic. Durruti went from the Column's headquarters to rally his men at the front, and was struck by a bullet when he got out of his car. He was subsequently rushed to the Column's military hospital at the Hotel Ritz Madrid, where doctors concluded his wound was fatal and decided not to operate. His body was embalmed and transported to Barcelona for his funeral, which was held on 23 November. The funeral procession passed from Via Laietana through the city to the Columbus Monument, where Catalan President Lluís Companys and Justice Minister Joan Garcia Oliver gave the eulogies. Half a million people attended the funeral, which slowed the pace of the procession along its way to Montjuïc Cemetery and prevented Durruti's coffin from being buried until the following day.

Rumours and conflicting testimony shroud Durruti's death in mystery. According to the eyewitnesses present, the bullet was fired from the Hospital Clinic by Nationalists. Some militiamen of the Durruti Column alleged it was fired from the Moncloa Plaza by fifth columnists. Others suspected that Durruti was assassinated by the NKVD. Stalinist historiography differs, claiming that Durruti was killed by his own insubordinate men outside the Modelo Prison on 21 November. Nationalist radio stations also spread contradictory narratives about Durruti's death. An anonymous journalist for The Times claimed he was killed by the Friends of Durruti Group on Gran Vía. A later story published by Durruti's secretary Jesús Arnal held that the bullet was fired accidentally from Durruti's own gun. Durruti's biographer Abel Paz disputes the latter three narratives but does not to come to a solid conclusion about what happened.

== Background ==
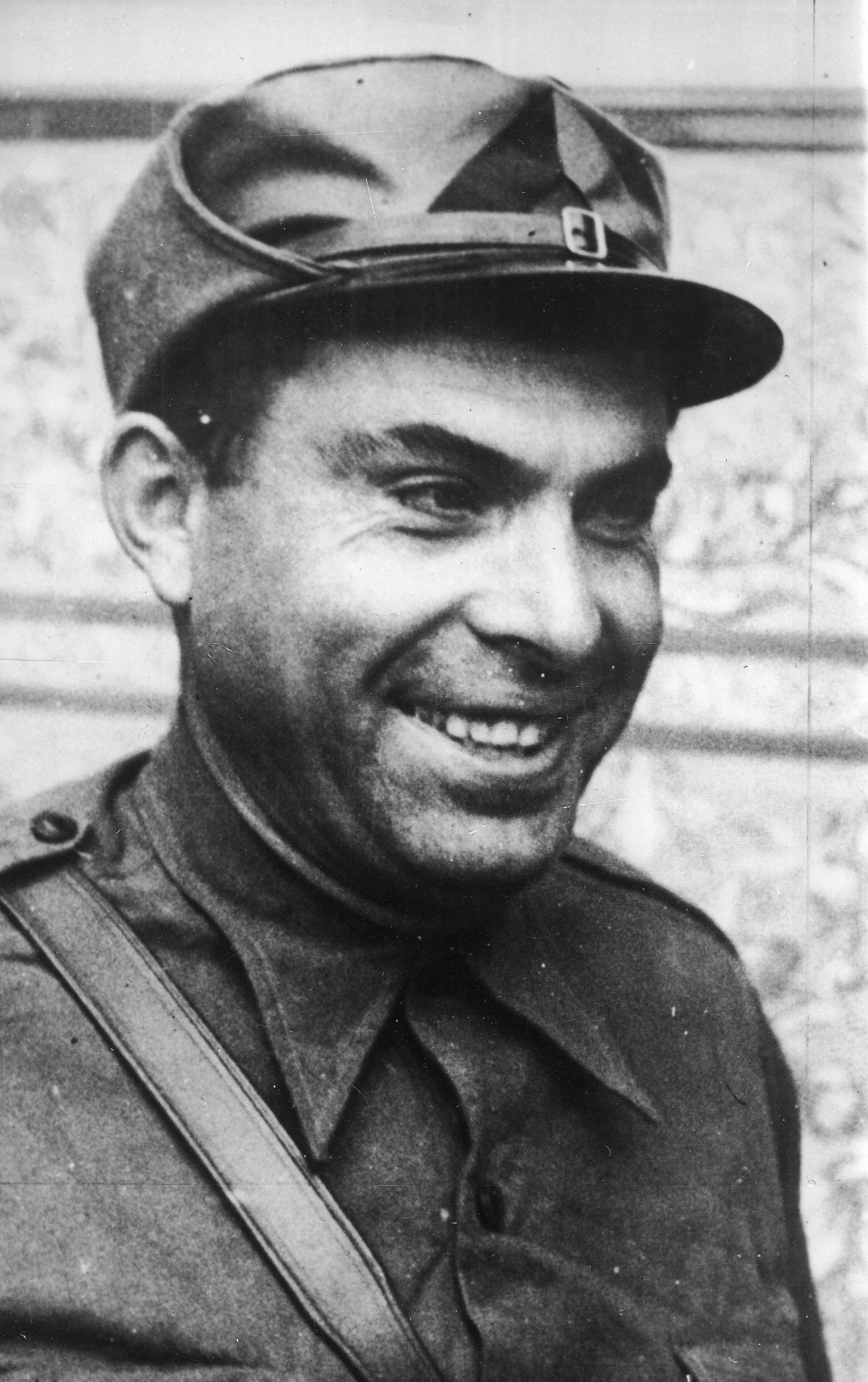
Buenaventura Durruti, during the early months of the Spanish Civil War in 1936

José Buenaventura Durruti Dumange was born in León on 14 July 1896. Radicalised by the repression of the Leonese trade union movement, he became an anarchist militant and went on to carry out a series of bank robberies and assassination attempts. He was forced into exile by the dictatorship of Primo de Rivera and led an unsuccessful insurrection against the regime before leaving Europe for Latin America. Together with his friend Francisco Ascaso, Durruti robbed banks in several countries throughout the Americas before moving back to France. They were arrested and imprisoned after attempting to assassinate Spanish king Alfonso XIII but released following a popular campaign for clemency. Together with their partners, they went on the move throughout Europe until the fall of the dictatorship in 1929.

After the proclamation of the Second Spanish Republic in 1931, Durruti returned to Spain, where he became an influential anarchist activist. He was soon implicated in the Alt Llobregat insurrection and deported in 1932. After he was allowed to return to Barcelona, he participated in the anarchist insurrection of January 1933, for which he was imprisoned. After his release, he led a subsequent anarchist insurrection in Zaragoza in protest against the election of a right-wing government. He was once again imprisoned but released the next year by a general amnesty. In the wake of the Revolution of 1934, he denounced individual acts of armed robbery, believing anarchists now needed discipline so they could organise collective action.

After the victory of the Popular Front in the 1936 Spanish general election, as rumours of a military coup began to circulate, Durruti called for the creation of a workers' army based on a militia system. Durruti led the anarchist resistance to the July 1936 military uprising in Barcelona, preventing the attempted coup and igniting the Spanish Revolution of 1936. He then established the eponymous Durruti Column, which was organised according to anti-authoritarian principles, and led it to fight the Nationalists in Aragon. After months of fighting in Aragon, Durruti was called to defend the Spanish capital of Madrid, which was under siege by the Nationalists. In mid-November 1936, he led his Column to Madrid, where they fought in the Battle of Ciudad Universitaria. Although Francisco Largo Caballero's government believed that the city was indefensible, Durruti insisted that the capital be defended by all means necessary. The optimism of the local population further convinced him that they could hold Madrid. He declared upon departing for the front that, "I go to Madrid to win or to die".

== Death ==
By 18 November, the University City's Hospital Clinic had fallen under Nationalist control. To recapture it, the Durruti Column took an adjacent block of houses on Avenida de Pablo Iglesias, which was 400 metres away from the Hospital. At 04:00 on 19 November, the Durruti Column discovered the Nationalists had left the Hospital Clinic for the night and quickly occupied the building. Hours later, the Nationalists emerged through a tunnel under the building and attacked the militiamen, forcing them to retreat to the upper floors. Durruti watched the offensive from the Directorate-General of the Civil Guard, where he witnessed his forces' entrapment. He ordered reservists to attack the Clinic's ground floor and free the trapped militiamen while he returned to his headquarters to attempt to secure relief for his exhausted troops.

At 12:30, Durruti arrived at his headquarters, which were located in the former palace of the Duke of Sotomayor, on Calle de Miguel Ángel. There he received a message from one of the Column's commanders José Mira, who was begging for relief. He responded by ordering Mira to remain at his post until replacements arrived later that day. According to Soviet journalist Roman Karmen, it was at this time that Durruti's alleged (Note: Durruti's biographer Abel Paz disputes whether Mamsurov was ever an advisor to Durruti. In Paz's interviews with several militiamen who had followed Durruti to Madrid, all verified that it was José Manzana, not Mamsurov, who was Durruti's military advisor.) military advisor Hadji-Umar Mamsurov arrived at the headquarters and convinced Durruti not to withdraw his forces from Madrid.

At 13:00, while Durruti prepared an order to relieve his troops, Antonio Bonilla arrived at his headquarters to tell him that the situation at the front had deteriorated. Durruti decided to see to it personally and, together with José Manzana, left for the front in his car, driven by Julio Graves. Durruti's car followed Bonilla and Miguel Doga, who were in their own car driven by a man named Lorente. Karmen said that Durruti refused to allow him or Mansurov to go with him and left in a car with Manzana, followed by four more cars. Abel Paz disputed Karmen's addition of four other cars, stating that the only other driver at the Durruti Column's headquarters was Antonio Mora. After arriving at the front in his car, Durruti was shot; eyewitness accounts vary considerably.

=== Shooting ===
==== Accounts by Antonio Bonilla, Julio Graves and José Manzana ====
According to Bonilla, the car that Durruti rode in was a Packard. Bonilla also said that Durruti was armed with a Colt 45, and Manzana with a submachine gun. According to Manzana, he and Durruti were also travelling with Miguel Yoldi and two messengers in the car, but Graves insisted that only he and Manzana were with Durruti. Bonilla later said that Graves was driving, with Manzana and Durruti in the back seat, but that no other men were in the car with them. Graves reported that they quickly drove to Cuatro Caminos, then down Avenida de Pablo Iglesias until arriving at a grouping of small houses east of the Hospital Clinic.

According to Bonilla, they saw a group of militiamen sun bathing behind a wall, but Manzana said a single militiaman was running in their direction while Graves said a group of militiamen was heading their way. Durruti, worried they were deserting, had Graves stop the car so he could ask them where they were going. According to Graves, they said nothing in response and Durruti ordered they return to their posts, but according to Manzana, they told him that they were going to get stretchers for the dead and wounded, so Durruti let them pass. At 14:30, as Durruti went to get back in the car – with its door open towards the Hospital Clinic – he was shot in the chest. Graves and Manzana both reported that the Moroccans and Civil Guards occupying the Hospital Clinic were shooting at them.

Bonilla reported that neither he nor his companions saw what happened, as they were putting their own car into gear at the time. He also said there was no fighting in the area and did not report hearing any shots, despite being only 20 metres away. Meanwhile, Manzana and Graves rushed to put Durruti back in the car and take him to hospital. When Bonilla saw Durruti's car quickly pulling away again, he rushed over to the militiamen, who reported that someone had been wounded, although they did not know who it was. After Bonilla, Doga and Lorente arrived back at the Durruti Column's headquarters, they met Manzana. According to Bonilla, Manzana told them that Durruti was at a meeting with the CNT National Committee. Bonilla accused him of lying, to which Manzana responded that he would quit the Column if they had lost trust in him. Bonilla insisted that Manzana tell him everything when they next saw each other and left the headquarters.

==== Account by Ramón García López ====
According to a militiaman named Ramón García López (also known by the hypocorism "Ragar"), the car Durruti had left in was a Buick; Jesús Arnal later reported that it was a Hispano-Suiza. Ragar said that it had been himself, along with Bonilla, Manzana and the driver in Durruti's car. However, Manzana and Graves did not mention Ragar being with them, leading Paz to doubt Ragar's story. Militiaman Ricardo Rionda said that Durruti had been in the car with Manzana, his driver and his Catalan bodyguard. Bonilla confirmed that there were two men in the Durruti Column called Ramón García, but said neither frequented the Column's headquarters, that he did not recall either being in Madrid, and that Durruti did not have any bodyguards.

In Ragar's account, around 16:00, they had driven down Paseo del Pintor Rosales until arriving at the Moncloa Plaza, where they stopped amid gunfire. Graves then got out to survey the area and was followed by Durruti. Ragar said that Durruti's naranjero submachine gun hit the car's running board and went off as he was getting out of the car, hitting him in the chest. Paz points out that this version is geographically inaccurate, as Paseo del Pintor Rosales does not meet Moncloa Plaza. In Jesús Arnal's version of events, the safety on Durruti's gun slipped as he got out of his car, and when he placed it on the ground, it let off a shot that fatally wounded him. Ragar reported that Durruti was bleeding profusely as they rushed him to the hospital.

==== Account by Mathieu Corman and J.M. ====
In another account, according to Belgian volunteer Mathieu Corman and an anonymous militiaman of the Durruti Column who went by the initials J.M., the shot was fired by fifth columnists from a cottage window on the Moncloa Plaza, piercing the car window and hitting Durruti. According to J.M., Bonilla, Manzana and a third unidentified person had been in Durruti's car; he said that Durruti's companions shot and killed one of the fifth columnists, but the other two managed to escape. A CNT membership card stolen from a hospital morgue was found on the dead man. Although Corman's story is supported by Solidaridad Obrera, no other sources confirm its veracity. Ricardo Rionda disputed that Durruti was shot on the Moncloa Plaza; he said that he himself had been on the Plaza at that time and that it was there that he had been told what had happened. In an interview with Hans Magnus Enzensberger in April 1971, Rionda said Ramón García had told him; but in a letter to Abel Paz in July 1971, Rionda said that it had been Manzana who told him.

=== Diagnosis ===
By 15:00, Durruti was in the operating room in the basement of the Ritz Hotel, which had been converted into a military hospital. Unable to believe what had just happened to him, Durruti sat up on the operating table and spoke with the doctors, who turned pale when he told them who he was. One of the doctors, Martinez Fraíle, found a bullet hole between Durruti's sixth and seventh ribs and severe internal damage to his pericardium. His prognosis was that "the wound was inoperable" and that it would certainly be terminal. Fearful of the consequences if their patient died during an operation, the duty doctor Josep Santamaria Jaume sent for Manuel Bastos Ansart, a respected surgeon at the CNT's military hospital in the Palace Hotel.

According to Bastos, when militiamen collected him from the Palace Hotel, they quickly told him that Durruti's own men were responsible for shooting him. When Bastos examined Durruti, he found that a 9 mm calibre bullet had crossed horizontally through his epigastrium and wounded his vital organs, grazing his large intestine, destroying his spleen and piercing his diaphragm before lodging itself in his lung. He diagnosed the injury as terminal and decided not to operate. The other doctors present were visibly relieved, knowing that they would not be held responsible for his death. As the noise of aerial bombardments slowly subsided, Durruti said what Bastos reported to be his last words: "they're going away now". According to Ricardo Rionda, who visited Durruti while he was still conscious, his last words were "too many committees", a reference to the revolutionary bureaucracy he had encountered in Madrid.

=== News spreading ===
At 16:00, Cipriano Mera was waiting for Durruti so they could begin a scheduled meeting. Instead of Durruti, Manzana arrived in tears and told Mera that he had been fatally shot. Mera, who had seen him earlier that day, was in disbelief as Manzana recounted what had happened earlier that day. The two agreed not to spread the news about it, as they were worried the Durruti Column's militiamen might conclude he had been assassinated by other Republicans. The only person they told was Eduardo Val. The three went to the Ritz, where they found Durruti being carried to his hospital bed. Mera kissed him on the forehead, left his side and told Manzana that he was dying. Val then told Mera to go to Valencia and inform Mariano R. Vázquez, the general secretary of the CNT, as well as Health Minister Federica Montseny and Justice Minister Joan Garcia Oliver. According to Ramón García Castro, as the Ritz lobby began to fill with grieving CNT members, Manzana and Bonilla left and had the Durruti Column withdrawn from the front to their barracks in Vallecas in order to prevent infighting from breaking out when the news broke. Enrique Líster called for the Durruti Column to be immediately relieved, considering its presence "a real danger for the whole of the Madrid front". Manfred Stern gave the order for the anarchist militias to stand down, and they were removed from the front line by the following day.

At 17:00, Graves arrived back at the Durruti Column's headquarters, where he met Josep Bort-Vela (a Solidaridad Obrera correspondent who wrote under the pseudonym "Ariel") and his brother Eduard. Graves broke down crying as he told them that Durruti had been fatally wounded but asked them not to break the news publicly. The three went to the Ritz Hotel, where they spoke to Santamaria. They then went on to the CNT's Madrid headquarters to report what had happened and agreed to keep quiet until they met to decide how to break the news. Bort-Vela then returned to the offices of Solidaridad Obrera with Graves. According to Soviet journalist Roman Karmen, while he was at the Ministry of War on the afternoon of the shooting, Hadji-Umar Mamsurov told him, "They've killed Durruti", although who "they" were was left ambiguous. Abel Paz questions how Mamsurov could have found out about Durruti's death at this time. Reporting published in the Madrid magazine Carta del Este alleges that Mamsurov may have been responsible for Durruti's death. In an interview with Soviet journalist Yegor Yakovlev, Mamsurov repeatedly insisted on his innocence and alluded to Durruti being assassinated by the anarchists.

=== Death and autopsy ===
During the last hours of Durruti's life, he was given large doses of morphine to ease his pain, leaving him to drift in and out of consciousness. According to Ramón García López, Durruti lost consciousness around 02:00. With Santamaria by his bedside, at 04:00 on 20 November 1936, Buenaventura Durruti died at the age of 40. He died around the same time as José Antonio Primo de Rivera, the leader of the Falange, was executed; historian Robert Kern speculates that Durruti's death "may have hastened" the execution. Santamaria then carried out an autopsy, confirming that a 9 mm calibre bullet had pierced his thorax under his left nipple. He also found gunpowder stains on Durruti's shirt, leading him to estimate that the bullet had been fired from point-blank range, at around 35 centimetres away. Due to the thickness of Durruti's chest, Santamaria concluded that the terminal diagnosis had been a mistake and that an operation could have treated the wound, but that it would not have been enough to save his life. Durruti's body was subsequently embalmed and sent away for his funeral.

=== Breaking the news ===
While this was happening, the Madrid CNT held a meeting on Calle Reforma Agraria to discuss how to disclose the news of Durruti's death. They were worried about undermining morale while the Nationalist offensive was still taking place. At 05:00, Antonio Mora arrived at the Durruti Column headquarters and informed Bonilla that Durruti was dead. Cipriano Mera arrived in Valencia at 06:00 and found the anarchist ministers at the Metropolitan Hotel. Garcia Oliver, who had opposed the decision to send Durruti to Madrid, was sad but unsurprised. Montseny, who had encouraged him to go to Madrid, was distraught and held herself responsible for his death. The three then went to meet Mariano Vázquez, who quickly chose Ricardo Sanz to succeed Durruti as the commander of the Column. Vázquez also ordered that initial reports of the shooting only say that an anarchist leader had been wounded but not to specify who or how. At 12:00, Garcia Oliver telephoned Sanz in Figueres, informing him that Durruti had died and that he had been selected as his replacement, and ordered him to immediately go to Madrid. Garcia Oliver also requested that he find out what had happened to Durruti and inform him of anything he discovered.

Durruti's death was publicly announced in Solidaridad Obrera on 21 November. The paper's editor Jacinto Toryho reported that Durruti had been killed at 08:30 by a bullet fired from a window on the Plaza de la Moncloa. Ramón García López later claimed that he and the other eyewitnesses concocted the story of an enemy bullet killing Durruti, as they had not wanted to tell the truth that he had shot himself by accident. According to Ramón García Castro, on that same day, Vázquez summoned the people who had witnessed Durruti's death and made them promise not to disclose the circumstances to anyone. Jaume Miravitlles said that the details of the CNT reports - including that a Civil Guard had shot him from a balcony with a Mauser pistol while he was with his bodyguard - made many people doubt the story.

== Funeral ==
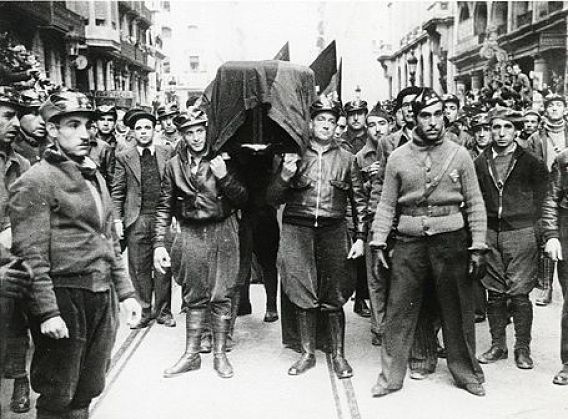
Funeral procession with Durruti's coffin, on 23 November 1936

After being embalmed, Durruti's body had been transferred to a building on the Plaza del Dos de Mayo. At 08:00, sculptor Victorio Macho arrived to make Durruti's death mask. When the sheets covering his naked body were removed, Macho remarked that he was "a real Hercules". Later that night, his body was taken to the Madrid CNT headquarters and put in a coffin made of mahogany. His suitcase was also brought there and opened, with CNT activists discovering it contained very little. According to Abel Paz, it only contained a shaving kit and a single change of clothes. According to Josep Peirats, it also contained two pistols, a pair of binoculars and sunglasses. Ricardo Rionda, who found some old clothes to bury him in, said that Durruti had "possessed nothing". Bort-Vela remarked that Durruti had "renounced everything except victory". While Durruti's body lay in state, his remains were visited by some of his militiamen, who briefly paid their respects before returning to the front.

On the morning of 21 November, Durruti's body was taken to Barcelona by a vehicular convoy. The procession did not disclose whose body it was carrying so it could continue unimpeded to Barcelona without stopping in each passing village. Nevertheless, people in every settlement flew red and black flags and brought out wreaths for the coffin. The procession was greeted by government ministers in Chiva and the regional committee of the CNT in Valencia.

Ricardo Sanz saw Durruti's coffin as it passed by San Miguel de los Reyes Prison and questioned Manzana and Yoldi about his death. When he arrived in Madrid later that day, he found everyone in disbelief that Durruti could have died. Many anarchists believed Durruti had been assassinated by communists and doubted the official narrative that he was killed by the Nationalists.

The next day, at the Durruti Column's barracks on Calle de Granada, Federica Montseny announced Sanz as Durruti's successor. There the surviving militiamen told Sanz they were convinced Durruti was assassinated by "our enemies within the Republic" and warned him that he might also be at risk, alleging that their Republican enemies wanted to eliminate anyone with "revolutionary ideas". Doctor Martinez Fraíle reported that the political climate in Madrid "changed overnight", with many leading anarchists, worried about communist persecution, fleeing the city. This led Fraíle to believe that Durruti had been assassinated. According to Sanz, many members of the Durruti Column returned to the Aragon front, thinking it safer for them than Madrid would be. Sanz then met with Doctor Santamaria and questioned people who had been with Durruti the day he died. Sanz ultimately concluded that Durruti had been killed by a burst of machine gun fire from the Hospital Clinic, declaring that "Durruti was a victim of carelessness". In his book Los que fuimos a Madrid, Sanz reaffirms his belief that Durruti was killed by an enemy bullet.

Around midnight on 22 November, Durruti's body finally arrived in Barcelona. There, it lay in state at the CNT headquarters on Via Laietana for the day while mourners came to pay their respects. British Trotskyist Mary Low believed his body had been displayed in the Catalan capital so anarchists could see his wounds and "decide by what treachery he had been killed". The funeral, which was entirely self-organised without prior planning, began on the morning of 23 November. The funeral procession was joined by 20-25% of Barcelona's population while even more lined the streets or watched from their balconies. Every Republican political party and trade union was in attendance, flying their flags. Jaume Miravitlles reported that it was a cloudy day, everybody attending was crying, and that the rest of the city was eerily quiet. By 09:00, Via Laietana was completely blocked up by the procession, which was unable to move due to the size of the crowds. At 10:30, militiamen of the Durruti Column carried his coffin out of the CNT headquarters, where it was greeted with raised fists and the anarchist anthem Hijos del Pueblo. The funeral procession was very noisy, with the sounds of engines, car horns and whistles mixing together with two different funeral marches that often lost their rhythm. It took 30 minutes to clear the way for the procession on Via Laietana, and many hours more before it reached the Plaça de Catalunya, with many of those in attendance getting lost on side streets, backing up or breaking away and arriving individually. Due to its spontaneous and improvised nature, German journalist Hanns-Erich Kaminski characterised it as a distinctly anarchist funeral.

After proceeding down La Rambla, eulogies were given by various Republican representatives beneath the Columbus Monument: Soviet consul Volodymyr Antonov-Ovsienko proclaimed "death to fascism" (Catalan: Mort al feixisme) and Catalan President Lluis Companys cried "onward" (Catalan: Endavant). Garcia Oliver concluded the service, saluting Durruti, as well as his partner Émilienne Morin and his daughter Colette, on behalf of the Republican government. During her own speech at the funeral, Federica Montseny called for greater discipline. According to British historian Hugh Thomas, the funeral culminated with 200,000 people pledging to uphold Durruti's legacy. The procession continued on to Montjuïc Cemetery, making its way through thousands of people that were blocking the way to the tomb. After the sun went down, it began to rain heavily, so the interment was postponed until the next day. Durruti was then interred in a mausoleum alongside his best friend, Francisco Ascaso.

A British parliamentary delegation estimated that the funeral was attended by more than 500,000 people. The city's cafes, theatres and factories shut down for the day. Historian Antony Beevor describes it as the largest funeral in Spanish history. Kaminski says it was, among working-class funeral processions, second only to the state funeral of Vladimir Lenin. According to Paul Preston, the funeral was the last public demonstration of the "mass strength" of the Spanish anarchist movement. Historian Helen Graham writes that the funeral displayed a "quasi-religious aura" that contributed to the mythologisation of Durruti.

Tributes subsequently poured in from the anarchist press, which venerated him as a hero and a revolutionary martyr. Andreu Nin and Marceau Pivert called his death a loss for the Spanish Revolution, while French journalist Pierre Scize questioned if anyone was capable of taking on his legacy. English author Humphrey Slater praised Durruti for his advocacy of discipline and working-class unity, and described his death as a loss for the whole Popular Front. Federica Montseny reported that the morale of Spanish revolutionaries fell sharply after Durruti's death was announced. Hugh Thomas remarked that his death represented "the end of the classic age of Spanish anarchism". Stanley G. Payne pointed to Durruti being one of the only military leaders on either side to have been killed in action during the civil war.

== Speculations and alternate narratives ==
The circumstances of Durruti's death aroused speculation due to contradictory accounts presented by primary sources and conflicting attempts by different anti-fascist factions to exploit his death for their own ends. Several contradictions emerged between the eyewitness accounts of Bonilla, Graves and Manzana, who disagreed on several details, as well as the two doctors' reports. Many revolutionaries were also unsatisfied with Durruti's death being another of many that had happened during the battle of Ciudad Universitaria and immediately began to embellish the story. Mary Low writes that it was too difficult for the anarchists to "admit that he had been shot like any ordinary man". Anarchist historian Josep Peirats posited that it was the strong attachment so many people felt towards Durruti that made them more likely to believe he was assassinated, which he called a "muddle-headed hypothesis". Durruti's biographer Abel Paz describes a "conspiracy of fear" surrounding Durruti's death, as everyone present was afraid of what the consequences of the news breaking might be.

Since Durruti's death, three main hypotheses have emerged to explain it. According to the official narrative, he was killed by the Nationalists. The anarchist narrative claims that he was assassinated by the NKVD. The Stalinist narrative claims that he was murdered by his own anarchist comrades. An additional version holds that he shot himself accidentally, although fewer people believed this narrative at the time.

=== Rumours of assassination ===
Rumours about Durruti's death circulated immediately after the news broke, causing clashes to break out between anarchists and communists and exacerbating divisions within the Republican ranks. Within the Durruti Column, a rumour spread that Durruti had been assassinated by communists. This narrative was suppressed in the anarchist press by order of the anarchist ministers in the Republican government but was later publicised by the Friends of Durruti Group. Interrogations of communists and International Brigaders found no evidence of there having been a communist assassin.

German journalist Antonia Stern linked Durruti's death to that of the Bavarian communist politician Hans Beimler, who had broken with the PSUC over their focus on the rearguard instead of the broader the war effort. Stern reported that Beimler had been killed in the University City 10 days after Durruti, and speculated about there having been a connection between the two deaths. Rumours circulated that Beimler had been assassinated by the Communist Party, and some militiamen were detained after speaking with Stern about the subject. According to Gaston Laval, an acquaintance had told him that the French Communist Party politician Auguste Lecœur openly bragged that the communists had assassinated Durruti.

Media commentary on Durruti's death began on the day of his funeral. On 23 November, the Nationalist-controlled Radio Sevilla declared that Durruti had been killed by people whose political ambitions he posed a threat to, and warned that the Republicans would kill more of his friends in the future. Members of the Falange claimed that Durruti, like his brother Pedro, was secretly a Falangist sympathiser and that the Communists had killed him in order to prevent him from joining up with the Falange. That same day, the French right-wing newspaper L'Écho de Paris and the German Nazi newspaper Völkischer Beobachter spread reports that communists had murdered Durruti at his apartment's front door, following alleged confrontations between the anarchists and communists on how to distribute loot from the "palaces of the nobility"; the papers also claimed that news of his death had provoked anarchists to massacre communists in Barcelona. The Nazi propagandist Karl-Georg von Stackelberg described Durruti as "subhuman", and repeated the narrative that he had been shot over the distribution of loot. Following these reports, Ricardo Rionda recalled that Nationalist radio stations abruptly changed their narrative, from claiming Durruti had been executed by communists, to claiming he had been killed by his own bodyguards. Rionda held the "fascists' troublemaker" Gonzalo Queipo de Llano responsible for circulating misinformation about Durruti's death and himself pressed the CNT newspapers to immediately publish a rebuttal to the rumours. The CNT and FAI issued a joint statement calling for anarchists to refrain from spreading the rumours of murder, which they blamed on the Nationalist "fifth column" and alleged to have been designed to divide and weaken the anti-fascist forces.

A year after Durruti's death, Ricardo Sanz organised an exposition on the defense of Madrid in Barcelona. There, Catalan politician Jaume Miravitlles saw the shirt Durruti had worn when he was shot. Miravitlles said he had medical experts examine the shirt, and that they concluded the bullet had been fired from a close range, reporting burn marks and traces of gunpowder. Miravitlles there concluded that Durruti had been murdered by anarchists in revenge for his strict discipline. According to Abel Paz, who also attended the exposition, the shirt was kept inside a glass display case; this meant that the doctors would have had to examine it through the glass, or Miravitlles would have required permission from Sanz to remove it. Miravitlles also claimed that he had met Durruti's partner, Émilienne Morin, at the exposition; according to Miravitlles, she told him that she would publicly accept the official narrative that he was killed by a Nationalist, but that she privately believed he had been murdered by one of his colleagues. When interviewed about this by Paz, Morin denied having attended the exposition and stated that she had never met Miravitlles.

=== Stalinist narrative ===
In an initial telegram to Solidaridad Obrera after the report of Durruti's death, Communist Party of Spain leader José Díaz mourned Durruti's loss at the hands of the "fascist bandits" and invoked his example to call for working-class unity against the Nationalists. On 23 November 1936, the Soviet newspaper Izvestia published an article praising Durruti. It credited him with the formation of the Popular Front government and claimed that he had become more sympathetic to the Communist Party before his death, reporting that he wanted a portrait of Joseph Stalin on his desk. Historian Burnett Bolloten describes the story as a "crude fabrication" that was "undoubtedly designed to capitalise on Durruti's death". Bolloten, who interviewed Durruti a few weeks before he died, reported that he displayed no indication of Soviet sympathies and only spoke of "the ultimate victory of the Anarchist revolution".

Soon after, Stalinist sources accused the anarchists of being responsible for Durruti's death and attempted to appropriate Durruti's image for their own ends. The Stalinists circulated rumours that Durruti had defected to the Communist Party but had kept his membership secret and that he was murdered by anarchists as a result. Karmen depicted most of the Durruti Column's "adventurist" militiamen as having been "capable of killing Durruti". The narrative of a secret defection was later taken up by Spanish historian Federico Bravo Morata. American journalist Louis Fischer reported that "it was generally assumed that his own men had murdered [Durruti]" due to his support for the government and his advocacy of anarchist collaboration in the war effort. The CNT-FAI pushed back against the various rumours, depicting them as a slanderous plot by the Nationalists to sabotage anti-fascist unity, and reaffirmed that Durruti had been killed on the frontlines like many others who had died fighting the Nationalists. Abel Paz also views these accounts with suspicion, saying that, although Durruti had vocally supported a united front against fascism, he never publicly expressed support for Stalinism or Bolshevism, not even when appealing to Soviet workers for support. Paz describes the narrative of Durruti joining the Communist Party as requiring "huge leaps of imagination". Federica Montseny dismissed the claims that anarchists had murdered Durruti as a "vile lie", spread by the communists to "descredit the anarchist movement".

Stalinist historiography diverges sharply from the eyewitness accounts and medical reports, contradicting them about the location where and date when Durruti's death occurred and holding that he was killed by one of his own men in front of the Modelo Prison on 21 November. Soviet journalist Mikhail Koltsov reported this version of events but did not speculate whether it had been an intentional shooting or a stray bullet. Rumours soon began to circulate that Durruti had been killed by his own men, who resented his strict discipline. Pierre Rosli, a French communist of the XI International Brigade, claimed that Durruti Column militiamen had told him that Durruti was killed by his own men, who had become disillusioned with his strict discipline and communist sympathies. French communist journalist Dominique Desanti likewise reported that a former anarchist had told her that Durruti had been executed by fellow anarchists, who disliked his strict discipline and authoritarian command.

This version of events is repeated by French historians Pierre Broué and Dominique Desanti and by British historian Hugh Thomas in an early edition of his book The Spanish Civil War, although in the book's 2001 revised edition, Thomas concluded that this version of events was both unproven and unlikely. An altered version of this narrative was also accepted by American author Ernest Hemingway, who wrote that Durruti was shot by his own indisciplined men at the Puente de los Franceses because he had ordered them to attack. Abel Paz adamantly rejects the Stalinist narrative, arguing that the Durruti Column's members were fiercely loyal to Durruti and willing to follow him to their deaths. He believes the only possible explanations for the column's militiamen assassinating Durruti are that one of them was "mentally unstable" or that the assassin was one of the Carabineros the column recruited upon arriving in Madrid. Interrogations of Durruti's companions found no evidence that any had been double agents.

=== The Times narrative ===
The Stalinist narrative was later reinforced by a journalist writing for the British newspaper The Times. In the 24 December 1964 issue of The Times Literary Supplement, a review of James Joll's The Anarchists and George Woodcock's Anarchism advanced a different narrative of Durruti's death. According to this version, after making a deal with the Communist Party, Durruti was shot on Gran Vía in full view of several eyewitnesses by agents of the extremist Friends of Durruti Group. The anonymous reviewer criticised Joll and Woodcock for accepting the official narrative that Durruti had been killed on the frontline by an unknown assailant, which the reviewer depicted as Republican government propaganda intended to cover up the conflict between the anarchists and communists. The reviewer called Durruti's death "the last act in the quarrel between [Mikhail] Bakunin and Karl Marx".

Hugh Thomas quickly responded to the review, questioning the assertions that the killing had been observed by several eyewitnesses, that the government wanted to hide the facts of Durruti's death, and that the Friends of Durruti Group even existed at that time. Albert Meltzer also responded, calling the reviewer's claims unsubstantiated and reaffirming the narrative that Durruti was shot on the frontlines by a Nationalist. He pointed out that the Friends of Durruti Group was not formed until after Durruti's death, following a Spanish anarchist tradition of calling groups "Friends of" a respected dead person. Meltzer denied that the Communist Party was in a position to strike a deal with Durruti during his lifetime, as the party only gained prominence after his death. He also pointed out that Durruti had publicly criticised Soviet-style communism and talked about suppressing the communists if the need arose. James Joll himself wrote back, commenting that the reviewer's anonymity made it difficult to assess the review's reliability as a source.

In response to the criticisms, the anonymous reviewer claimed to have been at the scene of the murder less than half an hour after it had taken place and that they were told what had happened by two of Durruti's bodyguards. They agreed Durruti had been shot from a window but rejected Meltzer's belief that it had been the work of Nationalists, instead claiming that the hospital was not held by the Nationalists at that time. They claimed that their sources were all dead, although they alluded to the possible existence of corroborating accounts in the American press and complained that Meltzer had not cited any sources either. They also disputed that the Friends of Durruti did not exist before Durruti's death and insisted on their culpability for Durruti's death, declaring it had been their objective to disrupt his negotiations with the communists. The narrative presented in The Times was later taken up by the Spanish communist politician Enrique Líster.

Abel Paz disputes the narrative, arguing that the circumstances are inconsistent with other information about the shooting and that the author neglected to mention specific details such as the location of the window the shot was fired from. He further argues that the author did not mention what any of the shooting's witnesses did in response. Paz concludes that the narrative presented in The Times was "pure invention" and that nothing in it "conforms to reality". Robert Kern also says that no proof either confirming or rebutting The Times narrative can be found.

=== Arnal's account ===
In 1967, while production was taking place for the war film Golpe de mano (Explosión) in the Aragonese village of Ballobar, cinematographer Mariano Pacheco struck up a conversation with Durruti's former secretary Jesús Arnal and asked him about how Durruti had died. He told Pacheco that Durruti had been shot accidentally after dropping his gun on the ground in the Plaza Moncloa. He claimed that division captain Ricardo Rionda had disclosed this to him in confidence while they were crossing the France-Spain border. According to Arnal, Pacheco confirmed the story, saying Julio Graves had been his father's assistant and had told him the same story. He said they had painted an anarchist red and black flag on the floor where it happened and that it remained visible for a long time after.

After Arnal announced his intention to publish his memoirs, in November 1969, he was interviewed for EFE by Angel Montoto. The interview was republished several times over the subsequent year, first in El Noticiero Universal, then in Heraldo de Aragón, La Mañana and La Prensa. Jaume Miravitlles discarded his previous hypothesis that Durruti was murdered and came to believe Durruti was killed accidentally by his own naranjero machine gun. Miravitlles felt that a CNT coverup under these circumstances would have been understandable, as they would "not want to destroy the myth that had formed round Durruti with such a banal explanation". After the interview was published, Arnal reported that a man by the name of "Ragar" had approached him and confirmed the broad details of the story while disputing some of the specifics. Ragar stated that Rionda had not been in the vehicle and that he did not know how Rionda had found out. Arnal claimed that Mariano R. Vázquez and Federica Montseny had sworn the witnesses to secrecy.

Seeking to investigate the story further, Arnal and the journalist Angel Montoto interviewed Durruti's doctors, Manuel Bastos and Josep Santamaria. The latter's testimony alleged that the bullet had been fired at point-blank range. This aligned closely with their own version of events. According to Montoto, Montseny confirmed the truth about the accident to him.

Arnal then went to Réalville, Occitania, where he visited Rionda. Rionda confirmed that he was not present at the scene of Durruti's shooting but that Manzana had told him what had happened shortly afterwards. Rionda reported that Durruti had been careless and held his naranjero (which Rionda called "a terrible gun [that] goes off easily") with its barrel towards him. Arnal only interviewed people with indirect knowledge of the shooting and never asked Pacheco how he could contact Julio Graves despite knowing Graves was an eyewitness to the events. Arnal ultimately concluded that Durruti's death was accidental. By June 1971, Arnal had broken off his collaboration with Montoto after the latter kept hold of his manuscripts; in a letter to Paz, Arnal accused Montoto of having "exploit[ed] the matter for his own benefit."

While in recovery from an eye operation, Rionda wrote to Abel Paz, providing his own version of events. According to Rionda, he had not known about the accident hypothesis until Arnal had told him about it. He had never mentioned such an accident to Arnal while they were crossing the France-Spain border. He said that Arnal was told this story by Durruti's driver and bodyguard and that he himself had been told about the circumstances of Durruti's death by a young man at his house in Barcelona. He said that when Arnal had visited him in Realvila, he told Arnal that it was not true that Durruti was wounded on Moncloa Plaza, as he had himself been there at that time. According to Rionda, when Arnal asked him about Durruti's machine gun firing accidentally, Rionda responded that he could neither confirm nor deny it, as he only knew what Manzana had told him. Rionda said that "Durruti died defending the revolution".

In her own letter to Paz, sent in July 1971, Federica Montseny reaffirmed her view that Durruti was shot by an enemy bullet while getting out of his car. She had said the same thing in previous interviews with Hans Magnus Enzensberger and Ángel Montoto. She blamed Montoto for circulating the story that Durruti's death was an accident. Montseny admitted to Paz that she had only briefly been led to doubt the official narrative after they told her he had been shot at close range. She said she had never even met Arnal, and that until Enzensberger and Montoto presented her with the story of the accident, she had not heard any alternative account of Durruti's death other than the official story and the hypotheses that he was assassinated. She said that she could not confirm or deny anything, as she was not in Madrid when Durruti died. She also disregarded the claim that she and Vázquez had sworn the witnesses to secrecy, arguing that it was improbable that such a secret could have been kept for 35 years. Paz ultimately concludes that Arnal's account of Durruti's death had been a publicity stunt. Montseny remained positive that Durruti was killed by an enemy bullet, reaffirming this in an interview with the Toulouse newspaper España Libre in November 1978. She continued to discuss Durruti's "unexplained" death in her memoirs, published in 1987.

=== Historians' conclusions ===
Various historians, including Julián Casanova, Joan Llarch, Jaume Miravitlles and Abel Paz, have summarised the various different possible narratives and presented them against each other. Abel Paz was ultimately unable to come to a solid conclusion about his death, which he says had become an "historical enigma". He states that none of the versions of Durruti's death have satisfactorily resolved the questions surrounding it, with all of them containing contradictions or omissions, and that no singular narrative can be synthesised without relying on speculation and diverging from appropriate historical methodologies. Helen Graham writes that, despite Paz's "ostensibly extensive analysis", his review of the differing narratives had "shed little light". In 1991, historian Burnett Bolloten wrote that the circumstances of Durruti's death "[remain] a mystery to this day". Biographer Hans Magnus Enzensberger presents the contradictory accounts and narratives as Durruti's "seven deaths".

In contrast, Robert Kern says that the "only tenable assumption" is that Durruti was killed by Nationalist snipers, who were scattered around the area by Juan Yagüe and who likely sought revenge for the failure of their Madrid offensive and the death sentence issued to Primo de Rivera. Josep Peirats also believed that it was "most likely" that Durruti had been killed by a Nationalist sniper, and that it was likely the sniper had not known who their target had been. Stanley G. Payne believes Durruti was "probably killed by friendly fire". Antony Beevor says one of Durruti's comrades accidentally shot him after their naranjero pistol got caught on the car door. Paul Preston writes that Durruti's death was "almost certainly the result of a gun accidentally going off in his car". Military historian Michael Alpert also believed that Durruti's death was caused "probably by the accidental discharge of a firearm". Helen Graham says that Santamaria's forensic analysis, as elaborated by Arnal, "appears compelling"; she ultimately concluded that, regardless of the various stories, "if Durruti’s end symbolised anything, then it was the brutal happenstance of death in war."

== Remains ==
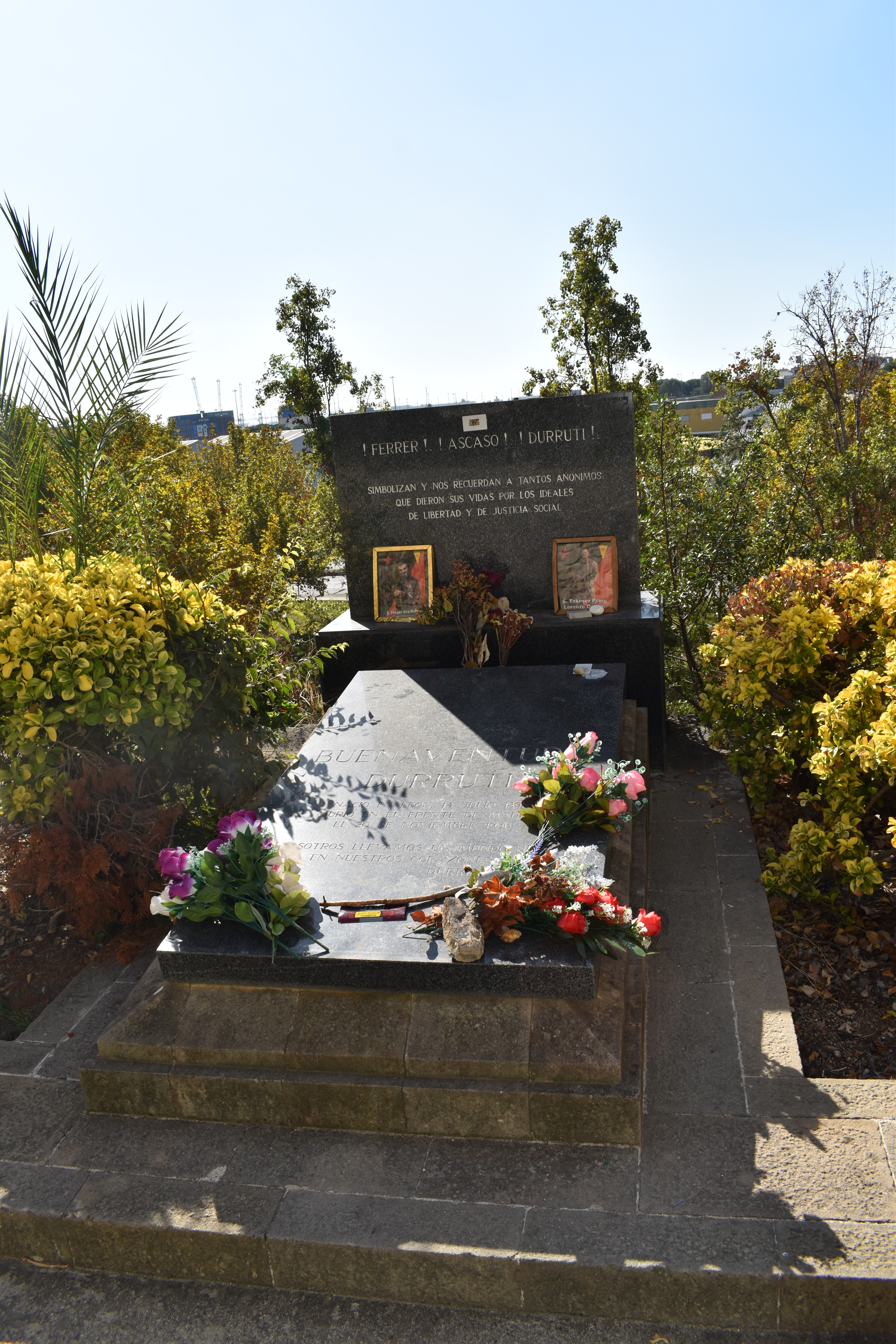
Durruti's gravestone in Montjuïc Cemetery

Durruti's remains were initially buried in the 69th plot at Montjuïc Cemetery on Via San Joan Bautista.The plot was previously vacant for 21 years and had been ceded to the confederal militias by the City Council of Barcelona. On 23 November 1937, in a commemoration marking the first anniversary of Durruti's death, the CNT and FAI unveiled a new mausoleum in the civil cemetery's Esplanada Igualdad. There they reinterred Durruti's remains alongside those of Francisco Ascaso and Francesc Ferrer. According to Mary Low, the tomb was designed with an opening so that Durruti's embalmed body could still be seen. The following year, a second commemoration was held at the mausoleum, attended by Joan Garcia Oliver and Ricardo Sanz. The latter was presented a wreath from the 26th Division (formerly the Durruti Column).

On 26 January 1939, Barcelona fell to the Nationalists' Catalonia Offensive. The Nationalist leader Francisco Franco subsequently ordered his men in Barcelona to erase identifying features of "red" burial sites in Montjuïc Cemetery in order to prevent them from becoming meeting places. In turn, the new civil governor of Barcelona, Wenceslao González Oliveros, ordered that identifying markers be removed from all graves of anarchist and Catalan nationalist leaders. He singled out Durruti's grave as a priority, ordering police to detain anyone attempting to visit the graves. Durruti's grave, as well as the adjoining graves of Ferrer and Ascaso, were desecrated and their inscriptions destroyed. The wall behind the graves, seen in photographs of it from 1938, was also demolished. Despite the Francoist authorities' intentions, the removal of the graves' inscriptions made them easier to identify.

When Abel Paz investigated the location of the tombs in the wake of the Spanish transition to democracy, a cemetery employee gave him information about the graves. He reported that the unmarked tombs were on what was then called Via San Carlos, but that the remains of Durruti, Ascaso and Ferrer were no longer buried there. The employee reported that the remains had been collected after the war by Émilienne Morin, which Paz knew to be false, and that they knew no more information than what they had in the cemetery's record book. The book said that by the following decade, grave 69, where Durruti's remains had been buried in November 1936, must have been empty, as Clara Vicente Boada's remains were buried there in July 1947. It said nothing else about the location of Durruti's remains. Paz subsequently called for Barcelona City Council to launch an investigation into the location of Durruti's remains and to identify the remains in the cemetery's unmarked mass grave.

== Bibliography ==
- Alexander, Robert J. (1999). The Anarchists in the Spanish Civil War. London: Janus Publishing Company. ISBN 978-1-85756-400-6.
- Alpert, Michael (2013). The Republican Army in the Spanish Civil War, 1936–1939. Cambridge University Press. ISBN 978-1-107-02873-9.
- Beevor, Antony (2006) [1982]. The Battle for Spain: The Spanish Civil War 1936–1939. London: Weidenfeld & Nicolson. ISBN 0-2978-4832-1.
- Bolloten, Burnet (1991). The Spanish Civil War: Revolution and Counterrevolution. University of North Carolina Press. ISBN 0-8078-1906-9. LCCN 89-77911.
- Enzensberger, Hans Magnus (2018) [1972]. "His Death". Anarchy's Brief Summer: The Life and Death of Buenaventura Durruti. Translated by Mitchell, Mike. Seagull Books. pp. 265–284. ISBN 9780857426000. OCLC 1077270536.
- Graham, Helen (2002). The Spanish Republic at War, 1936–1939. Cambridge: Cambridge University Press. ISBN 0-521-45932-X. OCLC 464890766.
- Kern, Robert W. (1978). Red Years/Black Years: A Political History of Spanish Anarchism, 1911-1937. Institute for the Study of Human Issues. ISBN 0-915980-54-1. LCCN 77-13595.
- Payne, Stanley G. (2012). The Spanish Civil War. Cambridge University Press. ISBN 9780521174701.
- Paz, Abel (2006) [1996]. Durruti in the Spanish Revolution. Translated by Morse, Chuck. Edinburgh: AK Press. ISBN 1-904859-50-X. LCCN 2006920974. OCLC 482919277.
- Peirats, Josep (2011) [2001]. Ealham, Chris (ed.). The CNT in the Spanish Revolution. Vol. 1. Translated by Sharkey, Paul; Ealham, Chris. PM Press. ISBN 978-1-60486-207-2.
- Preston, Paul (2006) [1986]. The Spanish Civil War: Reaction, Revolution and Revenge (3rd ed.). Harper Perennial. ISBN 9780007370061.
- Thomas, Hugh (2001) [1961]. The Spanish Civil War (4th ed.). New York: Modern Library. ISBN 0-375-75515-2.
