= Clara Thalmann =

Swiss anarchist (1908–1987)

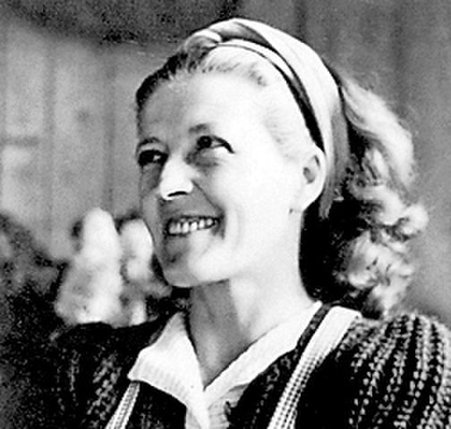
- Thalmann in 1936
- Born: Clara Ensner; 24 September 1908; Basel, Switzerland
- Died: 27 January 1987 (aged 78); Nice, France
- Spouse: Paul Thalmann (m. 1928; died 1980)
- Military career
- Allegiance: Spanish Republic
- Branch: Confederal militias (1936–1937)
- Units: Durruti Column (1936–1937); POUM Shock Battalion (1937)
- Conflicts: Spanish Civil War
- Occupations: Journalist, memoirist, athlete
- Political party: Communist Party of Switzerland (c. 1924–1929)
- Other political affiliations: Left Opposition (1928–1936); POUM (1936–1937)

Clara Thalmann (née Ensner; 24 September 1908 – 27 January 1987) was a Swiss journalist, athlete and militiawoman, who fought during the Spanish Civil War.

Born in Basel, she joined the Communist Party of Switzerland at an early age, but quickly developed sympathies for Trotskyism and anarcho-syndicalism, for which she was expelled from the party. Together with her husband Paul Thalmann, she went to Spain to participate in the People's Olympiad as a swimmer. When the Spanish Civil War broke out, she joined the Durruti Column and fought on the Aragon front. After experiencing disillusionment with the anarchists of the column, she joined up with the militias of the Workers' Party of Marxist Unification (POUM), in which she fought during the May Days of 1937.

After being arrested and imprisoned by Communist officials, she fled to France, where she helped to hide Jewish refugees during World War II. After the war, she supported a number of political causes but eventually fell out of political activism for around a decade, moving to the French Riviera in order to open a guesthouse. There she and her husband supported the student activists of the French New Left and wrote their memoirs about the Spanish Civil War. Clara herself returned to Spain after the Spanish transition to democracy and revisited the sites she had fought on, reflecting on the events she had participated in before her death in 1987.

== Biography ==
Clara Ensner was born in Basel, Switzerland, in 1908. At an early age, she joined the Communist Party of Switzerland, although by 1925, she was already breaking with the party line over her support for Leon Trotsky's Left Opposition. She also developed sympathies for Spanish anarcho-syndicalism, due to its radical programme that went even further in its revolutionary proposals than Soviet socialism. In 1928, she met Paul Thalmann, her future husband, through the publication Basler Volwarts. They were ejected from the communist party the following year. Together, Thalmann and Ensner became known as an exemplary "revolutionary couple", emphasising gender equality between them and together working towards their political goals. At this time, she developed a passion for swimming and joined the Swiss Workers’ Swimming Club (German: Schweizerischer Arbeiterschwimmclub).

=== Spanish Civil War ===
In 1936, Clara Thalmann travelled to Barcelona for the People's Olympiad, where she intended to compete as a swimmer. When the outbreak of the Spanish Civil War cancelled the planned events, she found herself fighting on the barricades during the Battle of Barcelona. Already a sympathiser of the anti-Stalinist left, she joined the Workers' Party of Marxist Unification (POUM) and helped produce its German language broadcasts.

She then enlisted with the anarcho-syndicalists of the Durruti Column, which went to fight on the Aragon front. According to her husband, Clara navigated the chaotic period of the early months of the civil war with relative ease. She quickly made contact with other European anti-fascist volunteers, forming the Durruti Column's International Group. She was only one of a handful of foreign women that fought on the front line, estimating 2% of the front line fighters in the confederal militias to have been women. She later wrote that she "scarcely considered herself a trailblazer or even a feminist."

She soon became disillusioned with the infighting that she observed among the ranks of the Spanish anarchists, instead gravitating towards the communists, who she saw as more organised. In early 1937, she left the Durruti Column and attempted to join up with the International Brigades, but she was rejected by the brigade's command, who declared that women "had no place in a professional army". She quickly returned to the Durruti Column but found that, in her absence, women had been purged from their ranks as well. But her experience in fighting allowed her to remain on the front line, even as other women volunteers were denied the same opportunity by vote of the male militiamen.

By April 1937, she had gravitated back towards the POUM, joining the party's "Shock Battalion" for a short time. She then turned her attention to the sectarian conflicts between various Trotskyist factions, helping to establish good relations between the POUM and the Italian anti-fascist refugees, who were largely organised around the Bolshevik–Leninists. She also became acquainted with the anarchist Friends of Durruti Group, which she alleged to have been under the direction of the German Trotskyist Hans Freund (aka "Moulin"). Víctor Alba and Stephen Schwartz disputed the validity of this allegation, claiming it to have been motivated by a "Trotskyist disbelief" in the agency of anarchists to act without Marxist intervention and pointing out its alignment with similar Stalinist accusations against the group.

During the May Days of 1937, Clara was caught up in the fighting, finding herself on a rooftop with other members of the POUM militia, including the English journalist George Orwell. After the victory of the Republican government's forces, Thalmann and her husband attempted to flee the country by boat, but they were captured and imprisoned by the Communist Party of Spain (PCE). In prison, they sang each other Swiss folk songs, changing certain lines in order to inform each other on what they were being interrogated. Swiss courts also served Clara with a prison sentence, having tried her in absentia for recruiting Swiss people to fight in Spain. Following an appeal from the Labour and Socialist International, the couple was released from their Spanish prison and decided to flee to France.

=== World War II and after ===
Following the outbreak of World War II and the subsequent Nazi occupation of France, Clara mostly attempted to stay out of trouble, refusing to officially join the French Resistance due to her disappointment with the collapse of anti-fascism in Spain. Nevertheless, she still participated in individual acts of resistance, notably helping to hide Jewish refugees in Paris.

After the war, the Thalmanns threw their support behind the cause of Algerian nationalism and agitated against the totalitarian rule of Stalinism in the Soviet Union. But they eventually found themselves dissilusioned by both camps of the Cold War and resigned from political activity. They moved to the French Riviera in 1953, purchasing land near Nice. There they established the "Serena guesthouse", which formed an egalitarian community. With the development of the counterculture of the 1960s, the Thalmanns returned to activism, working with the student activists of the New Left.

=== Later life ===
In their later life, they contributed to documentaries about their lives and published their personal memoirs, which were released shortly before Paul Thalmann's death in 1980. The fidelity of many of the allegations made in their memoirs was challenged by Víctor Alba and Stephen Schwartz, who advised caution when reading them as a primary source. When Burnett Bolloten questioned Clara herself on her husband's allegations that "right-wing" members of the POUM had shot Trotskyists, she claimed to have had no knowledge of such executions occurring.

Following the Spanish transition to democracy, in 1983, Clara Thalmann and the German anarchist Augustin Souchy travelled back to Spain and revisited the sites they had fought in during the Spanish Civil War. The following year, she expressed regret for the excesses of the Red Terror in Spain, particularly disagreeing with the executions of nuns that had resulted from the outburst of violence at the beginning of the war. After returning from her trip, Thalmann died in Nice in 1987.

== Selected works ==
- Thalmann, Clara; Thalmann, Paul (1977). Revolution für die Freiheit Stationen e. polit. Kampfes Moskau, Madrid, Paris (in German) (2 ed.). Hamburg: Verlag Association. ISBN 978-3-880320-46-8. OCLC 256628548.
- Thalmann, Clara; Thalmann, Paul (1983). Combats pour la liberté, Moscou, Madrid, Paris (in French). Translated by Darbon, Caroline. Paris: Spartacus. ISBN 978-2-902963-00-3. OCLC 28835323.
- Thalmann, Clara; Souchy, Augustin (1985). Die lange Hoffnung. Erinnerungen an ein anderes Spanien (in German). Grafenau: Trotzdem-Verlag. ISBN 978-3-922209-54-6. OCLC 230821451.

== Bibliography ==
- Alba, Víctor; Schwartz, Stephen (1988). Spanish Marxism vs Soviet Communism: A History of the P.O.U.M. Transaction Publishers. ISBN 0-88738-198-7. OCLC 807346688.
- Arielli, Nir (2013). "Getting There: Enlistment Considerations and the Recruitment Networks of the International Brigades during the Spanish Civil War". In Arielli, Nir; Collins, Bruce (eds.). Transnational Soldiers: Foreign Military Enlistment in the Modern Era. Palgrave Macmillan. pp. 219–232. doi:10.1057/9781137296634. ISBN 978-1-349-34012-5.
- Bolloten, Burnet (1991). The Spanish Civil War: Revolution and Counterrevolution. University of North Carolina Press. ISBN 0-8078-1906-9. LCCN 89-77911.
- Durgan, Andy (2018). "With the POUM: International volunteers on the Aragon Front (1936-1937)". Ebre 38: Revista Internacional de la Guerra Civil (1936-1939) (8): 131–161. doi:10.1344/ebre38.2018.8.21999. ISSN 1696-2672.
- Kruizinga, Samuël (2020). "'For your freedom and ours!': transnational experiences in the Spanish Civil War, 1936–39". In Gildea, Robert; Tames, Ismee (eds.). Fighters across frontiers: Transnational resistance in Europe, 1936-48. Manchester University Press. pp. 12–30. doi:10.7765/9781526151254.00010. ISBN 978-1-5261-5124-7. JSTOR j.ctv18hxw0g.10.
- Lines, Lisa (2011). Milicianas: Women in Combat in the Spanish Civil War. Lexington Books. ISBN 9780739164945.
- Physick, Ray (2017). "The Olimpiada Popular: Barcelona 1936, Sport and Politics in an Age of War, Dictatorship and Revolution" (PDF). Sport in History. 37 (1): 51–75. doi:10.1080/17460263.2016.1246380. ISSN 1746-0263. S2CID 151792051.
- Sanders, Huub (1997). "The collections of the International Institute of Social History, Amsterdam, with special reference to Switzerland". In Studer, Brigitte; Vallotton, François (eds.). Histoire sociale et mouvement ouvrier: un bilan historiographique, 1848-1998 (in French). Editions d'en bas. pp. 283–302. ISBN 978-2-8290-0226-7.
- Stout, James (2020). The Popular Front and the Barcelona 1936 Popular Olympics. Singapore: Palgrave Macmillan. doi:10.1007/978-981-13-8071-6. ISBN 978-981-13-8070-9. OCLC 1109779203. S2CID 199296339.
