= Jesús Arnal =

Aragonese Catholic priest and writer (1904–1971)

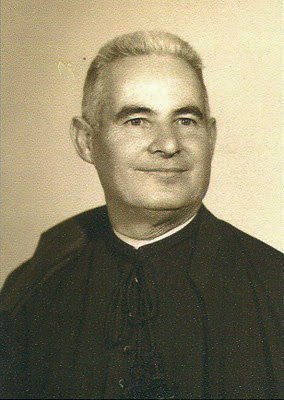
- Church: Catholic Church
- Diocese: Uesca

Personal details
- Born: Jesús Arnal Pena; 28 January 1904 Candasnos, Uesca, Spain
- Died: 8 December 1971 (aged 67) Ballobar, Uesca, Spain
- Denomination: Catholicism
- Occupation: Priest, secretary, writer
- Military career
- Allegiance: Spanish Republic
- Service: Confederal militias (1936); Spanish Republican Army (1937–1939)
- Service years: 1936–1939
- Rank: Commissar
- Units: Durruti Column (1936); 26th Division (1937–1939)
- Conflicts: Spanish Civil War

Jesús Arnal Pena (28 January 1904 – 8 December 1971) was an Aragonese Catholic priest and writer. He was caught in Aragon at the beginning of the Spanish Civil War, and joined the Durruti Column to protect himself from anti-clerical violence. He worked as a clerk for the Column, organising personnel and attempting to prevent looting by militiamen. After revealing his status as a priest to the Column and becoming friends with its commander Buenaventura Durruti, he became known as "Durruti's priest". After Durruti's death, he became a secretary to Ricardo Rionda Castro, the captain of the 26th Division, who told him Durruti had been shot accidentally by his own gun. Later in life, he began working on his memoirs and publicised Rionda's account of Durruti's death in the Spanish press.

== Biography ==
=== Early life and priesthood ===
Jesús Arnal Pena was born in 1904. He became a Liberal Catholic priest, holding a modernised view of the priesthood. In 1935, Arnal became the parish priest for the small Aragonese village of Aguinaliu; he caused a commotion after he arrived in the town on a motorbike wearing overalls. Despite this, he was not able to convince the villagers of the sincerity of his liberal values and witnessed rising tensions in the community over the subsequent year.

=== Civil War ===
When the Spanish Civil War broke out in July 1936, he worried that his life was at risk and fled to Candasnos, where he sought refuge from his anarchist friend Timoteo Callén. However, Callén was unable to guarantee his safety and suggested that he instead join up with the Durruti Column, an anarchist militia which had already been rumoured to have killed priests and burned churches in Lleida. Arnal later disputed the Durruti Column's responsibility for this, saying the Old Cathedral of Lleida had been set on fire by a unit of 100 radicals one month after the Durruti Column had passed through the city. He also said that Buenaventura Durruti, the Column's commander, had punished the men responsible after they arrived in Aragon.

Arnal went to the Column's headquarters in Burcharaloz, where he was assigned work as a clerk. From this post, Arnal registered new volunteers for the Column and kept a list of all its personnel. Within the Column, Arnal came to understand the anarchists' motivations for anti-clerical violence, as they saw priests as an instrument for capitalism. He came to believe that clergymen did not face hostility for "the mere fact of their existence", but that they were attacked if they were perceived to be working with the Nationalists. He did not initially reveal his status as a priest to the Column. Some militiamen recognised him, but did not say anything, as he was known to be under Durruti's protection. After he finally told the Column the trurth about himself, he was warmly accepted by the militiamen.

On one occasion, Arnal recalled that Durruti saved a former landlord from execution and had Arnal assign him a job as a primary school teacher. On another occasion, Durruti directed Arnal to organise vehicles to collect sex workers from the frontlines, take them away to Sarinyena and then send them back to Barcelona. Arnal asked Durruti if he could give them a sermon on the commandment "Thou shalt not commit adultery", but Durruti told him only to send them away from the front. Arnal reported that, despite them moving the sex workers from the front, more showed up again soon after. In September 1936, militiamen of the Column had begun looting supplies from storehouses in the province of Lleida. Durruti ordered Arnal to put a stop to the looting, and when Arnal protested, worried about being shot over his status as a priest, Durruti provided him with an escort and a written order. Arnal collected receipts of the requisitions and ordered a stop to the requisitions. He singled out one militiaman, who he found in a brothel, and ordered him to return all the cases of Virginia cigarettes which he had stolen. Arnal reported that the looting ceased soon after.

Over the early months of the war, Arnal formed a close friendship with Durruti, who gifted him with a Latin Bible before he was killed in the Siege of Madrid. When Durruti departed for Madrid, he left Arnal behind in Aragon. By this time, Arnal had become known by the nicknames of "Durruti's secretary", "Durruti's priest" and the "red priest". Arnal later went on to become the political commissar for a company of the Spanish Republican Army, and acted as a secretary for Ricardo Rionda Castro, the captain of the 26th Division. After the Nationalist victory in the war, Arnal fled over the France–Spain border, where Rionda told him that Durruti had died in an accident after his own submachine gun's safety failed. According to Arnal, they had been sworn to secrecy about the accident by Mariano R. Vázquez and Federica Montseny.

=== Later life and memoirs ===
Shortly after the war, Arnal returned to Spain, where the Francoist dictatorship interned him in a concentration camp. After he was released, he moved to Aragonese village of Ballobar to resume his work as a parish priest.

In 1967, while production was taking place in his village for the war film Golpe de mano (Explosión), he had a conversation with the cinematographer Mariano Pacheco, who asked him about how Durruti had died. This conversation inspired him to begin writing his memoirs. After he announced his intention to publish his memoirs, he was interviewed by Angel Montoto in late 1969; the interview, in which he proclaimed Durruti to have accidentally shot himself with his own submachine gun, was republished several times by various different publications.

After the interview was published, Arnal was approached by a man calling himself "Ragar", who confirmed the broad strokes of the story while disputing individual details. Seeking to investigate the story further, Arnal interviewed Durruti's doctors Manuel Bastos and Josep Santamaria Jaume; the latter's testimony aligned the closest with their own understanding of the events. While Montoto went to Tolosa to speak with Federica Montseny, Arnal went to Realvila to talk to Rionda; both confirmed the veracity of the story. Arnal concluded that "the last word has been said on the matter". In 1971, he sent letters to Durruti's biographer Abel Paz, who attempted to reconcile the different narratives of Durruti's death. His memoirs were finally published in 1972.

== Selected works ==
- "Mis aventuras en la Columna Durruti" ["My Adventures in the Durruti Column"] (La Prensa, 1970)
- Por qué fui secretario de Durruti [Why I was Durruti's secretary] (Lleida, 1972)

== Bibliography ==
- García-Guirao, Pedro (2018). "Representations of Catholicism in Contemporary Spanish Anarchist-themed Film (1995–2011)". In Christoyannopoulos, Alexandre; Adams, Matthew S. (eds.). Essays in Anarchism and Religion. Vol. II. Stockholm University Press. doi:10.16993/bas.d. ISBN 978-91-7635-072-0.
- Enzensberger, Hans Magnus (2018) [1972]. Anarchy's Brief Summer: The Life and Death of Buenaventura Durruti. Translated by Mitchell, Mike. Seagull Books. ISBN 9780857426000. OCLC 1077270536.
- Paz, Abel (2006) [1996]. Durruti in the Spanish Revolution. Translated by Morse, Chuck. Edinburgh: AK Press. ISBN 1-904859-50-X. LCCN 2006920974. OCLC 482919277.
- Ryan, Richard (2015). A ‘gigantic struggle between believers and those without God’? Catholics in the Republic during the Spanish Civil War, 1936-9 (PhD thesis). Royal Holloway, University of London.
