= Friends of Durruti Group =

Spanish radical anarchist group (1937–1939)

Friends of Durruti Group Agrupación de los Amigos de Durruti
- Secretary: Félix Martínez
- Vice-secretary: Jaume Balius i Mir
- Founded: 15 March 1937
- Dissolved: c. 1939
- Split from: CNT-FAI
- Headquarters: Barcelona
- Newspaper: El Amigo del Pueblo
- Ideology: Libertarian communism Platformism; Trotskyism (alleged)
- Political position: Far-left

The Friends of Durruti Group (Spanish: Agrupación de los Amigos de Durruti) was a Spanish anarchist group commonly known for its participation in the May Days. Named after Buenaventura Durruti, it was founded on 15 March 1937 by Jaume Balius i Mir and Félix Martínez, who had become disillusioned with the policies of the CNT-FAI's leadership. During the May Days in Barcelona, they actively agitated among the anti-government forces, advocating for the formation of a "revolutionary junta", in close collaboration with Spanish Trotskyists. Following the suppression of the uprising, the group began publishing the newspaper El Amigo del Pueblo, in which they denounced the CNT-FAI for "collaborationism", resulting in their expulsion from the organisation. Their 1938 pamphlet Towards a Fresh revolution, which reaffirmed their proposals for a revolutionary junta, became an influential text within the anarchist current of platformism. But the group ultimately failed to make a broader impact within the Spanish movement and collapsed by the end of the war.

== Formation ==
From the outset of the Spanish Revolution of 1936, elements of the Spanish anarchist movement expressed doubts about and even opposition to the policy of the CNT-FAI leadership. As the Spanish Civil War dragged on, frustrations emerged within the movement, as they began to feel that they were losing their influence over the direction of events. This was exacerbated when the CNT joined the Popular Front government, in a move that was rejected by some sections of the anarchist movement. In early March 1937, 1,000 militiamen quit the Aragon front in protest against the government's decree for their militarisation into the Spanish Republican Army.

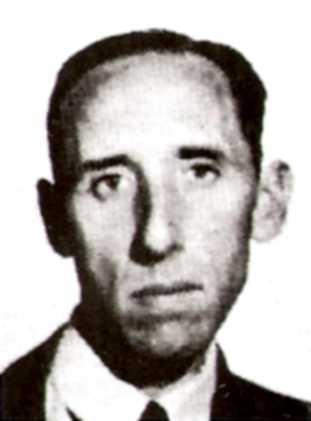
Jaume Balius i Mir, founder and vice-secretary of the Friends of Durruti group

In Barcelona, some members of this current converged into a small group that openly called on the anarchist rank-and-file to disobey the leaders of their organisations. Three of the leading figures in this group were: Francisco Carreño, an Argentine anarchist that had joined the Durruti Column, but who did not join the fight on the Madrid front; Pablo Ruíz, a textile worker unaffiliated with any anarchist group that many anarchists suspected of being an informant; and Jaume Balius i Mir, a former Catalan nationalist that made his name publishing a series of radical nihilist articles in the CNT's newspaper. According to Balius, this group began meeting in early January 1937.

On 15 March 1937, the Friends of Durruti Group was established by Felix Mártinez and Jaume Balius i Mir, who were associated with the CNT's newspaper La Noche. According to Albert Meltzer, the group's name followed a Spanish anarchist tradition of naming groups "Friends of" a deceased philosopher or activist; in this case, it was named after Buenaventura Durruti. The group declared their goal was to combat the CNT-FAI leadership's "counter-revolutionary" policies, publishing a series of pamphlets that argued their cause. They also closely allied themselves with the small Trotskyist organization known as the Bolshevik–Leninists, who were affiliated with the Fourth International. Balius would deny that they shared any members, despite Communist claims that the group was controlled by the Trotskyists.

From its early days, the group issued pamphlets denouncing the CNT leadership for "collaborationism" with the "Stalinist counter-revolution", instead calling for a government to be constituted solely by the CNT and UGT. In late April 1937, the group pasted its slogans on walls throughout Barcelona, gaining the support of the POUM, who agreed with their proposals for working-class power. According to Balius, by the beginning of May 1937, the organisation counted between 4,000 and 5,000 members.

== May Days ==
On 3 May, following an attack against the Telefónica building by the Communist-led Assault Guards, people throughout Barcelona began constructing barricades and a civil conflict erupted between government forces and the anarchists. The Friends of Durruti Group, along with their allies in the POUM and the Bolshevik–Leninists, quickly sprang into action.

When Joan Garcia i Oliver and Federica Montseny appealed for a cease fire, the Friends of Durruti and the Bolshevik–Leninists redoubled their efforts to keep the conflict going. The Friends of Durruti Group distributed leaflets among the barricades, demanding: the disarmament of the state's armed forces; the dissolution of all political parties that opposed them; the execution of the people responsible for the conflict; and the formation of a revolutionary junta, in the form of a CNT-FAI-POUM government. The POUM published the group's leaflet in their newspaper La Batalla, and the group quickly received praise for their proposals from the Spanish Trotskyist leader Grandizo Munis, who claimed the group's leaflets "corresponded entirely" with the Trotskyists' own leaflets.

The group's proposal for a Revolutionary Junta, which Spanish journalist Carlos Semprún noted to have only ever existed in "purely theoretical" terms, would have had anarchists and the POUM seize power from the Generalitat de Catalunya and shoot all of their opponents. But when the group attempted to negotiate the establishment of the Junta with the POUM, they failed to agree on terms. Pavel and Clara Thalmann would later note that the collaboration between the Friends of Durruti and the Marxist groups only amounted to distributing each other's leaflets, without any formal alliance being formed.

For their abortive attempts to form a revolutionary junta, the Friends of Durruti were denounced as agent provocateurs by the CNT-FAI regional committees, who reiterated calls for a cease fire. This was in turn repudiated by the Friends of Durruti, who claimed "moral authority" and encouraged people to keep fighting the government. The POUM's leadership was likewise criticised by American Trotskyist Felix Morrow, who denounced them for failing to defend the Friends of Durruti from the "slander". Nevertheless, repeated calls for a ceasefire from both sides brought the armed conflict to an end by 7 May, when revolutionaries withdrew from the barricades and assault guards occupied the city.

According to historian Robert J. Alexander, the Friends of Durruti Group really "had nothing to do with the May Events", pointing out that their appeals that anarchists remain on the barricades were unsuccessful. However, the group would later be blamed for the May uprising by the Communist Party, who denounced the group for encouraging "criminal Trotskyism" in El Noticiero Universal. British Communist John Langdon-Davies even denied the anarchist character of the May Days, claiming it to have actually been a Trotskyist putsch and that the Friends of Durruti were a Trotskyist front organization. The POUM was also harshly repressed in the wake of the May Days, in a Communist-led campaign that was condemned by both CNT general secretary Mariano R. Vázquez and the Friends of Durruti, the latter of whom warned that CNT-FAI militants could be targeted next in the political repression campaign.

== Later activity and legacy ==
In the wake of the May Days, the group began publishing the clandestine newspaper El Amigo del Pueblo, named after the French Revolutionary newspaper L'Ami du peuple. Their first issue opened by accusing the CNT-FAI regional committees of having "betrayed the workers and the revolution". This was quickly denounced by the CNT-FAI and the group's members were formally expelled from the anarchist organisations. In the pages of Fragua Social, the CNT also labelled Balius himself as a Marxist, a term that Balius rejected but never managed to dispel from the popular consciousness. AIT representative Helmut Rüdiger went further in his own denunciations, characterising the group as "bolshevik-fascist".

El Amigo del Pueblo continued publication until the end of 1938, with Balius claiming its peak circulation to be around 15,000. That year, the group also published its pamphlet Towards a Fresh Revolution, which itself circulated between 30,000 and 50,000 copies, and later came to be known as "the second core text of Platformism". Drawing from Mikhail Bakunin's proposal for a federated fighting force, the group reiterated its calls for the establishment of a Revolutionary Junta, capable of managing the war effort and supervising the revolution. Rejecting collaboration with capitalist forces, they also called for the state's arms and finances to be seized, allowing for the restructuring of the armed forces and the economy. The pamphlet was taken by American Trotskyist Felix Morrow to amount to a "conscious break with the anti-statism of traditional anarchism", due to its advocacy of a revolutionary junta as an organ of power capable of overthrowing capitalism. Morrow's characterisation was disputed by the South African sociologist Lucien van der Walt, who claimed it instead to represent a "reaffirmation of the traditional perspectives of anarchism", pointing out its basis in anarcho-syndicalism.

Although the group's analysis of the strategic failings of the Spanish anarchist movement were later taken up by CNT historian José Peirats, according to Robert J. Alexander, the group "never became a significant force within the anarchist movement." POUM member Juan Andrade later described the "ultrarevolutionary" Friends of Durruti as "a monument of ideological confusion" that ultimately had no political effect. Bolshevik-Leninist leader Grandizo Munis himself later praised the group for evolving from anarchism to Marxism, comparing their idea of the revolutionary junta to those of the soviets, while also criticising them for lacking "political clarity". In an article written for The Times Literary Supplement, an anonymous reviewer claimed that the Friends of Durruti Group had assassinated Buenaventura Durruti on Madrid's Gran Vía, in reprisal for a deal he had allegedly made with the Communist Party; this version of events was disputed by historians Hugh Thomas, Albert Meltzer and Abel Paz, who each pointed out that the group was not established until after Durruti's death. The group's publication El Amigo del Pueblo has been collected and archived by the International Institute of Social History.

== Bibliography ==
- Alexander, Robert J. (1999). Anarchists in the Spanish Civil War. Vol. 2. Janus Publishing. ISBN 1-85756-412-X.
- Amorós, Miquel (2003). La revolución traicionada: La verdadera historia de Balius y los Amigos de Durruti (in Spanish). Barcelona: Virus Editorial. ISBN 84-96044-15-7.
- Beevor, Antony (2006). The Battle for Spain: The Spanish Civil War. Weidenfeld & Nicolson. ISBN 0297848321.
- Bolloten, Burnet (1991). The Spanish Civil War: Revolution and Counterrevolution. University of North Carolina Press. ISBN 0-8078-1906-9. LCCN 89-77911.
- Casanova, Julian (2004) [1997]. Anarchism, the Republic and Civil War in Spain: 1931–1939. Routledge. ISBN 0-203-02280-7.
- Guillamón, Agustin (1996). The Friends of Durruti Group: 1937-1939. Translated by Sharkey, Paul. Edinburgh: AK Press. ISBN 1-873176-54-6.
- Paz, Abel (2006) [1996]. Durruti in the Spanish Revolution. Translated by Morse, Chuck. Edinburgh: AK Press. ISBN 1-904859-50-X. LCCN 2006920974. OCLC 482919277.
- Pinta, Saku (December 2012). "Council Communist Perspectives on the Spanish Civil War and Revolution, 1936–1939". In Prichard, Alex; Kinna, Ruth; Pinta, Saku; Berry, Dave (eds.). Libertarian Socialism: Politics in Black and Red. Palgrave Macmillan. pp. 116–142. ISBN 978-0-230-28037-3.
- van der Walt, Lucien; Schmidt, Michael (2009). Black Flame: The Revolutionary Class Politics of Anarchism and Syndicalism. Edinburgh: AK Press. ISBN 978-1-904859-16-1. LCCN 2006933558. OCLC 1100238201.
