= Arnal =

Arnal is both a surname and a given name. Notable people with the name include:

== Surname ==
- Ángel Ribera Arnal (1909–2002), Spanish chess master
- Albert Arnal (1913–1966), Spanish Valencian pilota
- Étienne Arnal (1794–1872), French actor
- Jesús Arnal (1904–1971), Aragonese priest
- Maria Arnal (born 1987), Spanish singer
- Mariana Arnal (born 1973), Argentine field hockey player
- José Cabrero Arnal (1909–1982), Spanish cartoonist
- Rubén García Arnal (born 1980), Spanish footballer

== Given name ==
- Arnal Llibert Conde Carbó (born 1980), Spanish footballer
