= Paul Thalmann =

Paul Thalmann may refer to:

- Pavel Thalmann (1901–1980)
- Paul Thalmann (footballer) (1884–?)
