= Pavel Thalmann =

Swiss journalist and activist (1901–1980)

- Born: 1901; Basel, Switzerland
- Died: 1980 (aged 78–79); Niça, Occitania, France
- Other names: Paul Thalmann, Franz Heller
- Occupation: Journalist
- Political party: Communist Party of Switzerland (1921–1929); Communist Party Opposition (1930–1935); Workers' Party of Marxist Unification (1936–1937)
- Movement: Trotskyism
- Spouse: Clara Ensner (m. 1928–1980)
- Military career
- Allegiance: Spanish Republic (1936–1937); Free France (1940–1944)
- Service: Durruti Column (1936–1937); French resistance (1940–1944)
- Service years: 1936–1944
- Wars: Spanish Civil War; World War II

Pavel Thalmann (1901–1980) was a Swiss Trotskyist journalist and activist. He was an early member of the Communist Party of Switzerland (KPS), from which he was expelled and subsequently joined the Communist Party Opposition (KPS-O). During the Spanish Civil War, he joined the Workers' Party of Marxist Unification (POUM) and fought alongside anarchists in the Durruti Column. He later participated in the French resistance and remained active as an activist until the last years of his life.

== Biography ==
Pavel Thalmann was born in the Swiss city of Basel in 1901. As a young man, he came under the influence of the Swiss anarchist Fritz Brupbacher and joined the Communist Party of Switzerland (KPS) in 1921. From its founding, Thalmann served as general secretary of the Swiss communist youth, and as a functionary for the Communist International. In 1922, he was delegated to attend a congress of the Young Communist International in Moscow, where he first came under the influence of Leon Trotsky. In 1925, Thalmann stepped down as secretary of the Swiss communist youth and enrolled in Moscow's Higher Party School, where he studied alongside Hermann Erb and Ernst Illi. He graduated in 1928 and returned to Basel, where he became editor of the communist newspaper Basler Vorwärts. He also met and married Clara Ensner, a fellow Swiss communist. They became known as an exemplary "revolutionary couples", emphasising gender equality between them.

In 1929, Thalmann and Ensner were expelled from the KPS and subsequently joined the Communist Party Opposition (KPS-O). In 1932, Thalmann became editor of its newspaper, Arbeiter-Zeitung, which was published from Schaffhausen. By this time, he was a himself a committed Trotskyist. After the outbreak of the Spanish Civil War in July 1936, he joined Clara in Revolutionary Catalonia. There Thalmann worked as a journalist, and joined the Workers' Party of Marxist Unification (POUM). Thalmann then signed up to fight in the Durruti Column, alongside anarcho-syndicalists from Germany. During the May Days, Thalmann and Ensner were imprisoned by the Communist Party of Spain (PCE). Around this time, they had become acquainted with the anarchist Friends of Durruti Group, which they later alleged to be under the influence of the Trotskyist Hans Freund (aka "Moulin"). Thalmann later alleged that some right-wing POUM activists executed Trotskyist members of the party, although Clara claimed she had no knowledge of this happening.

They soon fled to France. During World War II, Paul Thalmann participated in the French Resistance, providing aid to German refugees in Paris. After the war, Thalmann and Ensner agitated for the Soviet human rights movement and for Algerian independence. In 1953, they moved to Niça, where they opened a guesthouse and worked together with student radicals during the counterculture of the 1960s. During the 1970s, the couple published their memoirs in the French and German languages, which became key primary sources for histories of the Spanish Civil War. Their memoirs were more concerned with depicting the political sectarianism of the Trotskyist factions than the revolutionary activities of the POUM. Pavel Thalmann died in 1980.

== Selected works ==
- Thalmann, Clara; Thalmann, Paul (1977). Revolution für die Freiheit Stationen e. polit. Kampfes Moskau, Madrid, Paris (in German) (2 ed.). Hamburg: Verlag Association. ISBN 978-3-880320-46-8. OCLC 256628548.
- Thalmann, Clara; Thalmann, Paul (1983). Combats pour la liberté, Moscou, Madrid, Paris (in French). Translated by Darbon, Caroline. Paris: Spartacus. ISBN 978-2-902963-00-3. OCLC 28835323.

== Bibliography ==
- Alba, Víctor; Schwartz, Stephen (1988). Spanish Marxism vs Soviet Communism: A History of the P.O.U.M. Transaction Publishers. ISBN 0-88738-198-7. OCLC 807346688.
- Bolloten, Burnet (1991). The Spanish Civil War: Revolution and Counterrevolution. University of North Carolina Press. ISBN 0-8078-1906-9. LCCN 89-77911.
- Durgan, Andy (2018). "With the POUM: International volunteers on the Aragon Front (1936-1937)". Ebre 38: Revista Internacional de la Guerra Civil (1936-1939) (8): 131–161. doi:10.1344/ebre38.2018.8.21999. ISSN 1696-2672.
- Sanders, Huub (1997). "The collections of the International Institute of Social History, Amsterdam, with special reference to Switzerland". In Studer, Brigitte; Vallotton, François (eds.). Histoire sociale et mouvement ouvrier: un bilan historiographique, 1848-1998 (in French). Editions d'en bas. pp. 283–302. ISBN 978-2-8290-0226-7.
