= Mandarin Oriental Ritz, Madrid =

Hotel in Madrid, Spain

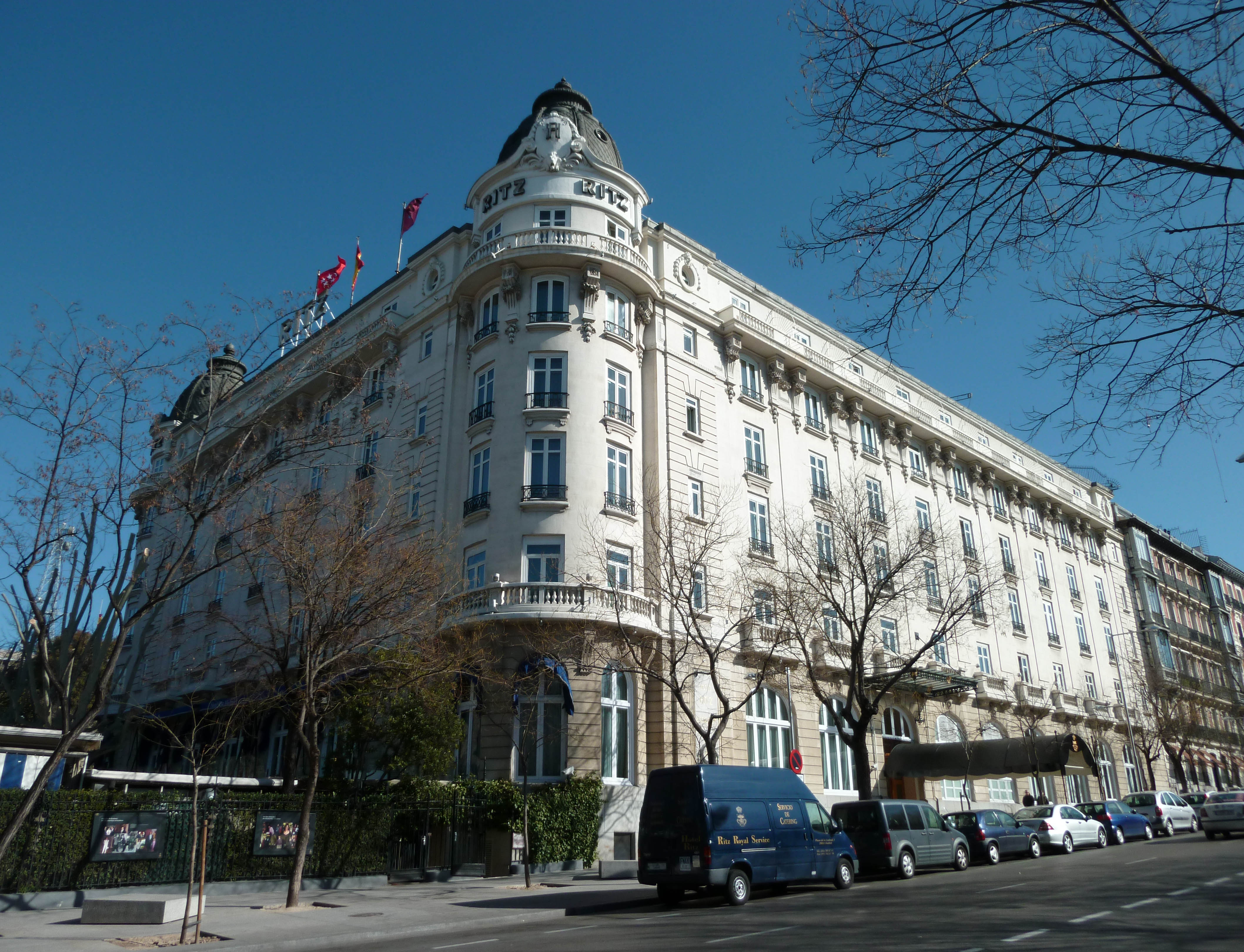
- Interactive map of the Mandarin Oriental Ritz, Madrid area

General information
- Architectural style: Art Nouveau
- Location: Plaza de la Lealtad 5, 28014, Madrid, Spain
- Coordinates: 40.4156°N 3.6928°W
- Opening: 1910
- Affiliation: Mandarin Oriental Hotel Group

Design and construction
- Architects: Charles Mewès; Luis de Landecho

Other information
- Number of rooms: 167

Website
- Mandarin Oriental Ritz, Madrid

The Mandarin Oriental Ritz, Madrid is a historic five star Belle Époque hotel in Madrid, Spain at No. 5 in Retiro district, next to the Prado Museum. Opened in 1910, it is owned and managed by the Mandarin Oriental Hotel Group. The hotel's façade is a listed national monument.

== History ==
The Hotel Ritz Madrid was built at the behest of King Alfonso XIII who, returning from a tour of Europe, realized that the Spanish Court lacked a hotel with enough pomp for European royalty and other illustrious visitors. His idea was for Madrid to have such a hotel to equal the likes of The Ritz London Hotel and Hôtel Ritz Paris. His own marriage to Victoria Eugenie of Battenberg was another excuse to give Madrid a luxury hotel, the first in the Spanish capital. The king himself contributed part of the capital, along with other members of Madrid society, and he instructed the Ritz Development Company that it would be designed and built under the personal supervision of César Ritz. Although Ritz initially intended to be involved in the project, he was unable to do so because of depression. Although there was an expressed desire of Alfonso XIII supporting the hotel's construction, some of the politicians of the time showed strong opposition to the project, alleging that the projected height of the building was not permitted by zoning laws for this area. Eventually, however, the project was able to proceed.

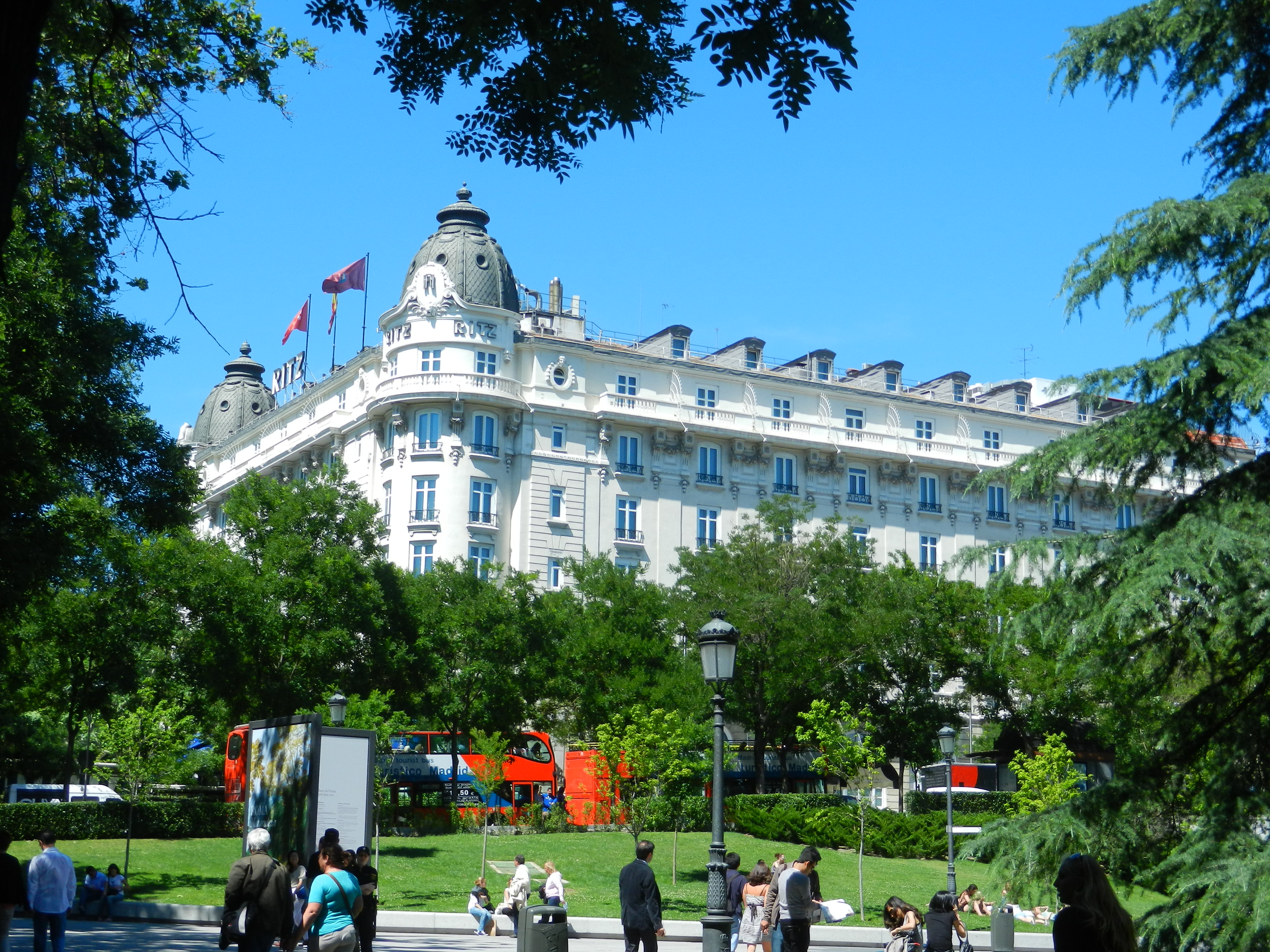
View of The Ritz from the park

The Ritz was designed by French architect Charles Mewes and Spanish architect Luis de Landecho. It became one of the first in Madrid to use reinforced concrete in its construction. The most famous Spanish and foreign companies of the time contributed to the decoration of its rooms. Carpets were woven to order at Spain's Royal Tapestry Factory, linens were commissioned from Ireland and crockery and cutlery arrived from England.

The chosen site was once an area occupied by barracks belonging to the Hippodrome Circus and the gardens of the old Theatre Tivoli, and was formerly owned by Jardines del Buen Retiro de Madrid. The hotel's grand opening on 2 October 1910 was officiated by King Alfonso XIII in the company of ministers and representatives of the mayor of Madrid. The hotel quickly became one of the leaders of the social and cultural life of the capital. The first board was chaired by Luis de Cuadra y Raúl Marquis de Guadalmina. The first hotel manager was Antonio Mella, who had previously managed the Ritz Hotel in Paris and London. His wife helped him in hotel management taking over guest services and laundry rooms.

Belmond sold the Ritz to the Mandarin Oriental Hotel Group and The Olayan Group in May 2015 for $148 Million. Mandarin Oriental announced plans to completely renovate the hotel at a cost of $103 million. On 18 September 2018, scaffolding and part of the sixth-floor of the hotel collapsed, killing one construction worker and injuring 11 more. The hotel reopened on April 16, 2021, as Mandarin Oriental Ritz, Madrid.

== Architecture and fittings ==
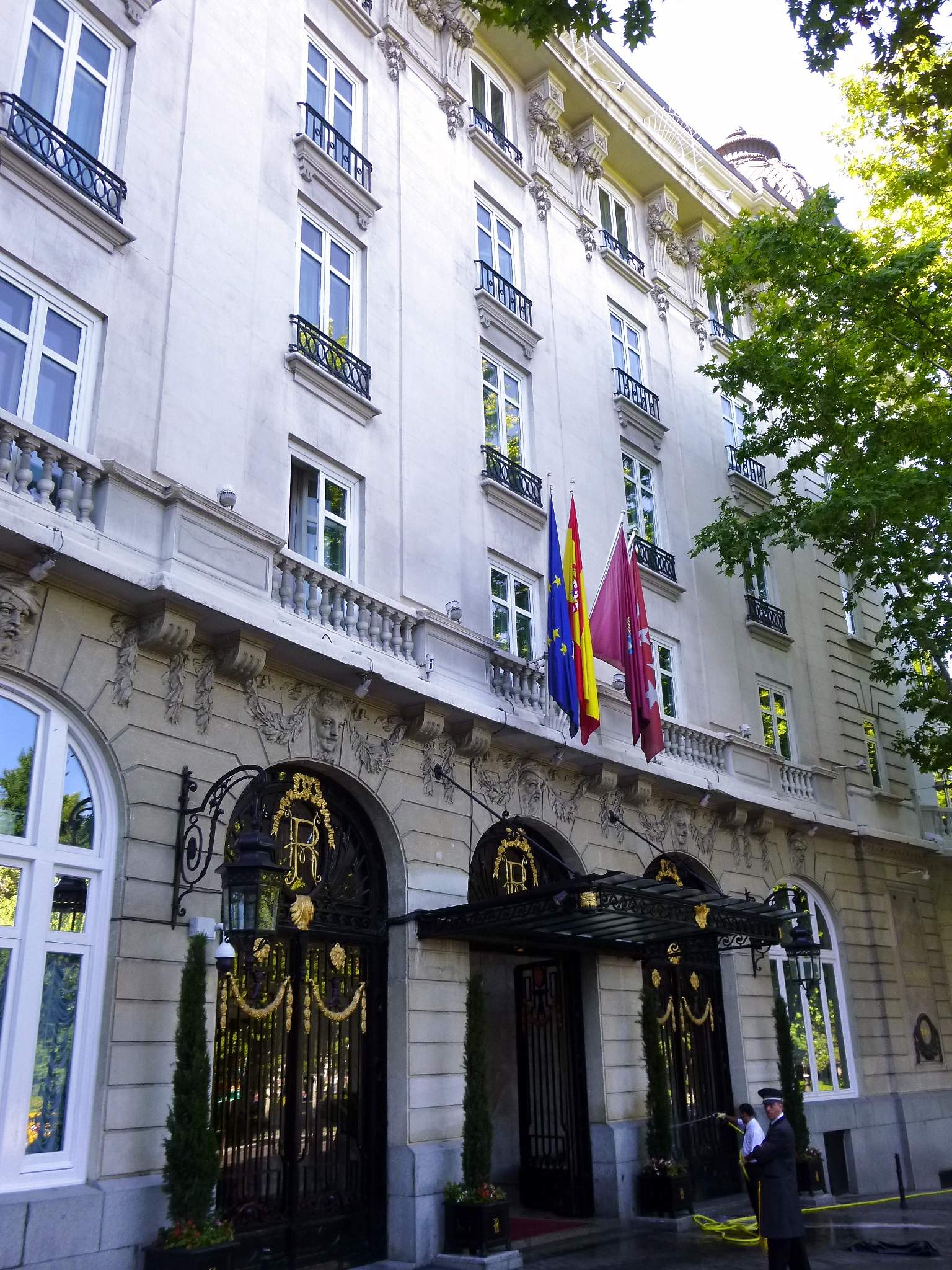
Principal entrance on the Plaza de la Lealtad

The building was designed in 1908 by French architect Charles Mewès and built in the period 1908-10 under the direction of Luis de Landecho. This was one of the first buildings in Madrid that used reinforced concrete in its construction, which was completed on 14 May 1910. Notable Spanish and foreign companies were hired to decorate the rooms. The carpets were woven in the Royal Tapestry Factory, linens was commissioned to Irish firms, the furniture was commissioned to Lissarraga y Sobrinos, and mirrors were by Pereantón. The china was by Limoges and cutlery was imported from The Goldsmiths.

== Chronology ==
- 1910: The hotel opened with a grand party attended by the king and other members of the royal family. It quickly became one of the major players in the capital's social and cultural life. Its first board of directors was chaired by Luis Raul Cuadra and Marquis de Guadalmina. The first hotel manager was Antonio Mella, who had previously worked at the Ritz hotels in Paris and London. The first Maître d'hotel was Olivier Pau and the chef Félix Ruiz del Castillo. Many of the dishes to be served in the restaurant were inspired by the great chef and restaurateur Georges Auguste Escoffier. The hotel introduced many new culinary customs such as afternoon tea. It also held dances on Tuesday evenings, when new styles such as the foxtrot became popular. Famous guests began to arrive.
- 1916: In October the exotic dancer and spy Mata Hari came to stay. She booked in under the name of Countess Masslov and operated from the hotel until January 1917.
- 1926: The hotel was acquired by the Belgian Georges Marquet. It was to stay in his family, being passed down through three generations, until his grandson sold it in 1978.
- 1936: During the Spanish Civil War the hotel became a military hospital and was the site of the death of Buenaventura Durruti
- 1939: The hotel reverted to its original purpose, under the direction of Georges Marquet's son, also called Georges.
- 1970s: The hotel saw a period of decline under the control of Georges Marquet's grandson, who had no interest in it. Some activities and traditional services, such as the New Year's Eve dinner and dining in the garden, ceased. Georges Marquet III was keen on philately and purchased a large stamp collection, using money taken directly from the hotel company, to the anger of certain shareholders.
- 1978: Former mayor of Barcelona Enrique (Henry) Maso acquired the hotel.
- 1981: UK company Trusthouse Forte, owner of some 880 hotels in 70 countries, bought the hotel. A period of investment began to regain its former glory.
- 1996: Following a series of legal and financial struggles Trusthouse Forte sold the hotel.
- 1999: The hotel's return to prominence was underlined when Travel & Leisure named it as one of the top ten hotels in the world.
- 2001: French group Le Meridien undertook a complete restoration.
- 2003: Orient-Express Hotels entered into a joint venture with Spain's Omega Capital to acquire and run the hotel.
- 2014: Orient-Express Hotels was renamed Belmond Ltd. and the hotel changed its name to Hotel Ritz by Belmond.
- 2015: Belmond announced the sale of its stake in the hotel to The Olayan Group. Its name changed to Mandarin Oriental Ritz Madrid.
- 2021: The hotel reopens after a complete renovation by architect Rafael de La-Hoz and designers Gilles & Boissier.

== Guests ==
Throughout its history, many famous guests have stayed at the hotel, from Ernest Hemingway to Rainier III, Prince of Monaco and his wife Grace Kelly who celebrated their honeymoon in one of its suites. Others include Ava Gardner, Michelle Pfeiffer, Madonna, Jagatjit Singh and Anita Delgado, Mata Hari, Randolph Hearst and Marion Davies, and Haile Selassie.

- An unwritten rule not to admit NTR (Spanish: No tipo Ritz, lit. 'Not the Ritz type': artists, film stars or bullfighters, men without a tie—Herbert von Karajan included—women in trousers, etc.) as hotel guests during the Marquet direction made the actor James Stewart unwelcome. However, he flashed his military badge and described himself as a colonel in the American army and therefore was admitted.
