= Nova Ibèria =

Illustrated magazine in Barcelona, Spain (1937)

- Categories: Propaganda magazine
- Frequency: Monthly
- Founded: January 1937
- Final issue: March 1937
- Country: Spain
- Based in: Barcelona
- Language: Catalan
- ISSN: 1887-7753
- OCLC: 779857779

Nova Ibèria (Catalan: New Iberia) was a monthly illustrated propaganda magazine which was published in Barcelona, Spain, in 1937 during the civil war. Its subtitle was Revue mensuelle illustrée (Catalan: Illustrated monthly magazine).

== History and profile ==
Nova Ibèria was established by the Commission for Propaganda of the Generalitat of Catalonia in Barcelona in 1937. The first issue of the magazine appeared in January that year. The magazine was a propaganda publication and was started during the civil war to disseminate news and reports about the activities of the Republican Catalan forces. It was published by the Propaganda Commissariat in large format in Catalan, but also featured articles written in French and English. The magazine also had a Spanish sister magazine.

Nova Ibèria employed the photographs and posters to support Republican forces based in Catalonia. Josep Sala and Margaret Michaelis, a Polish-Jewish photographer, were among the staff of the magazine. The Catalan propaganda secretary, Jaume Miravitlles, published articles in the magazine.

Nova Ibèria came out monthly until its closure in March 1937 and produced a total of four issues during its run. The last issue of Nova Ibèria was a double issue.
