= Communist Party Opposition (Switzerland) =

The Communist Party Opposition was a Swiss communist organisation active from 1930 to 1935. It was associated with the German Communist Party Opposition, and was affiliated with the International Communist Opposition. The organisation developed from divisions with the Communist Party of Switzerland, itself founded after a section of the left wing of the Social Democratic Party of Switzerland left the party in 1921.

== History ==
The Swiss Communist Party Opposition was formed in 1930 by members of the Communist Party of Switzerland who opposed the Comintern's policies of social fascism and the Revolutionary Trade Union Opposition strategy. Instead, they supported cooperation with social democratic organisations through a united front policy.

Its support was mainly concentrated in Schaffhausen, where much of the local communist party organisation joined the new group. Leading members included Walther Bringolf, Hermann Erb and Hermann Huber, and the party was associated with the daily newspaper Arbeiter-Zeitung. Smaller groups were also active in Zurich around Moritz Mandel and Ernst Illi, in Basel around Paul Thalmann, and elsewhere in German-speaking Switzerland.

In Schaffhausen, the party had significant electoral and trade union influence, with Bringolf being re-elected to the National Council in 1931 as one of the canton's representatives and was elected mayor of Schaffhausen in 1932. The organisation also held influence within the local structures of the Swiss Trade Union Federation.

Internationally, the Swiss Opposition was affiliated with the International Communist Opposition and maintained close relations with the German Communist Party Opposition associated with Heinrich Brandler and August Thalheimer. After the Nazi seizure of power in Germany in 1933, it supported the activities of German opposition communists operating against the regime.

The establishment of the Nazi regime in Germany also contributed to debate within the Swiss Opposition over closer cooperation with the larger socialist and communist parties. Negotiations with the Communist Party of Switzerland were unsuccessful, while discussions with the Social Democratic Party led to the gradual integration of most of the organisation into the latter by 1935.
