= Charles Mewès =

French architect and designer

Charles Frédéric Mewès
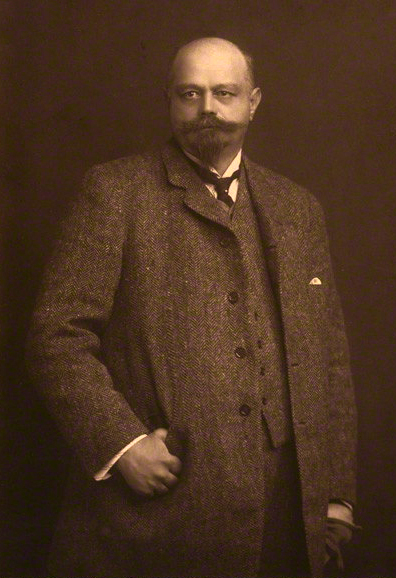
- Portrait of Charles Frédéric Mewès, c. 1906
- Born: 30 January 1858; Strasbourg, France
- Died: 9 August 1914 (aged 56); Paris, France
- Education: École des Beaux-Arts
- Occupation: Architect
- Practice: Mewès & Davis
- Buildings: Hôtel Ritz Paris; The Ritz London Hotel; Hotel Ritz Madrid; Carlton Hotel, London; Hotel María Cristina; Royal Automobile Club; Château Porgès de Rochefort-en-Yvelines
- Projects: Ocean Liner Amerika; Ocean Liner Vaterland; Ocean liner RMS Aquitania

Charles-Frédéric Mewès (30 January 1858 – 9 August 1914) was a French architect and designer.

== Biography ==
Born in Strasbourg, Alsace in 1858, Charles Frédéric Mewès grew up a Parisian after his family fled the Prussian invasion and annexation of Alsace in 1870. RIBA Journal described him as "essentially a big man, both mentally and physically. He was a magnetic personality with a compelling influence tempered by a humorous and tolerant outlook on life". He trained under Jean-Louis Pascal at the École des Beaux-Arts and throughout his career, eschewed Art Nouveau and the Modern style for an elegant, meticulous recall of eighteenth-century France: the logical, spatial symmetry of Louis XVI style recurs continuously.

Mewès's hotels, steamer interiors, clubs, and private residences suited the Edwardians' opulent taste. He designed the Hôtel Ritz in Paris (1898), the Ritz Hotel in London (1905-1906), and the Hotel Ritz in Madrid (1908-1910); he was also the designer behind Hotel María Cristina hotel in San Sebastián (completed in 1912). The London Ritz was one of Britain's earliest steel-framed buildings. Subsequently, he undertook the design of Pall Mall's largest club, the Royal Automobile Club (1910) which featured a "Pompeiian" swimming bath adapted from the earlier l'Etablissement Hydrominéral (1899-1900) at Contréxeville. His first maritime interior, the Hamburg America Line's SS Amerika was completed in 1905; the company so admired it that Mewès became their resident designer. On three German ships he incorporated a Pompeiian pool, although not on his last vessel, Cunard's Aquitania (1914).

Although Mewès only spoke French, he opened firms in both London and Cologne, Germany, with Arthur Joseph Davis, who had been his classmate at the École des Beaux-Arts, and with the Swiss Alphonse Bischoff.

Charles Mewès owned an extensive library, especially in the design field. In October 1947 the journal of the Royal Institute of British Architects described him as "The true type of the French intellectual of good stock". He designed many admired buildings, including the colossal Château Porgès de Rochefort-en-Yvelines, the Jules Ferry residence and his own residence at 36 Boulevard des Invalides in Paris. He himself became a teacher and taught many students from all over the world.

Charles Mewès bought the small castle of Scharrachbergheim in Alsace, where he spent much time with his three children after the death of his wife in 1896. He died in Paris in 1914.

== Selected works ==
=== Hotels ===
- Hôtel Ritz Paris, 15 Place Vendôme (1897–1898) : transformation of the Hotel de Gramont for César Ritz, the first hotel in the world to have a bathroom for each room thanks to his invention of ventilation courtyards.
- Carlton Hotel, London (1899), the first institution in London combining the use of stone and steel.
- Ritz Hotel, 150 Piccadilly (London) for César Ritz (1904–1905): Mewès attempted to realise a unity of style, dominated by references to the Louis XVI style.
- Hotel Ritz Madrid (1910), in association with the Spanish architect Luis de Landecho.
- Hotel María Cristina in San Sebastián (Spain) (1912).

=== Private residences ===
- Château Porgès de Rochefort-en-Yvelines (Rochefort-en-Yvelines) built between 1896 and 1904 for Jules Porges, inspired by the Hotel de Salm (Palais de la Légion d'honneur), but of double proportions. This grandiose project was not completed.
- Hotel Rodolphe Kann, 51 Avenue d'Iena (Paris): transformation for Calouste Gulbenkian of a building constructed by Ernest Sanson, in association with Emmanuel Pontremoli.
- Luton Hoo (Bedfordshire, England) for Sir Julius Wernher, associate of Jules Porges: complete redevelopment, addition of attic, grand staircase, interior decor (1903–05).
- Polesden Lacey (Surrey, England): extension built for the Hon. Margaret Greville to create an apartment intended to receive King Edward VII (1906).
- Coombe Court, Coombe (Surrey, England): renovation for Constance Gwladys, Countess de Grey.
- Internal remodelling of 16 Charles Street, Mayfair for Margaret Greville (1913–14)

=== Other buildings ===
- L'Etablissement Hydrominéral (1899–1900) at Contrexéville (Vosges)
- Royal Automobile Club on Pall Mall in London (1908–1911)
- Extension to the London Library (1932–34)
- Hudson's Bay House at 52-68 Bishopsgate for the Hudson's Bay Company (1926)

=== Ships ===
- Ocean liner SS Amerika (1905–1906), interiors: first Ritz restaurant at sea.
- Ocean liner SS Imperator (1913), interiors: remarkable for the use of marble in abundance, particularly for the swimming pool and for the first class dining room.
- Ocean liner SS Vaterland (1914), interiors: in this ship Mewès was the first to divide the shafts of the funnels to provide a complete vista of the central public rooms from one end of the ship to the other.
- Ocean liner RMS Aquitania (1914), interiors.
- Ocean liner SS Kaiserin Auguste Victoria.
