= Margaret Michaelis-Sachs =

Australian photographer (1902–1985)

Margaret (Margarethe) Michaelis-Sachs (née Gross, 6 April 1902 – 10 October 1985) was an Austrian-Australian photographer of Polish-Jewish origin. In addition to her many portraits, her scenes of the Spanish Civil War in Barcelona, Spain, and other places and her images of the Jewish quarter in Kraków in the 1930s are of lasting historical interest.

== Early life ==
Born in Dzieditz near Bielsko in southern Poland (then Austria-Hungary) on 6 April 1902, she was the daughter of Heinrich Gross, a well-to-do Jewish doctor. She studied photography at Vienna's Graphische Lehr-und Versuchsanstalt from 1918 to 1921.

== Career ==
In 1922, still in Vienna, she first worked for a period at the Studio d'Ora before spending a number of years at the Atelier für Porträt Photographie. She went on to work for Binder Photographie in Berlin and Fotostyle in Prague, and finally returned to Berlin in 1929 to work intermittently for a variety of studios during the hard times of the Depression.

In October 1933, she married Rudolf Michaelis who, as an anarcho-syndicalist, was almost immediately arrested and imprisoned by the Nazis. In December 1933, after Rudolf's release, the couple moved to Spain but they separated shortly afterwards. In Barcelona, Michaelis opened her own studio, Foto-elis. Collaborating with a group of architects, she produced documentary images of progressive architecture which were published in Catalan journals such as D'Ací i d'Allà and, after the start of the civil war, Nova Ibèria.

After returning to Poland in 1937, she obtained a German passport, went to London and, in September 1939, emigrated to Australia, first working as a house maid in Sydney. In 1940, she opened her "Photo-studio", becoming one of the few women photographers in Sydney. She specialized in portraits, especially of Europeans, Jews and people in the arts, many published in the journals Australia and Australian Photography. A member of the photographers' associations of New South Wales and Australia, in 1941, she was the only woman to join the Institute of Photographic Illustrators.

Margaret Michaelis's photographic career came to an end in 1952 as a result of poor eyesight. In 1960, she married Albert George Sachs, a glass merchant. She died on 10 October 1985 in Melbourne.

== Styles ==
In her early life, Michaelis used the sharp focus and sometimes unusual vantage points of modernist photography, while her portraits sought to reveal the psychological essence of her sitters. Her portraits were primarily focused on capturing the lives of Jewish immigrants. Of particular significance is the small set of scenes from the Jewish market in Kraków taken in the 1930s. Helen Ennis of the National Gallery of Australia stated the images "carry the weight of history, offering a visual trace of a way of life that was destroyed by fascism."

Michaelis was also fond of self-portraiture, using the landscapes around Sydney and Melbourne as her backdrop.

== Legacy ==
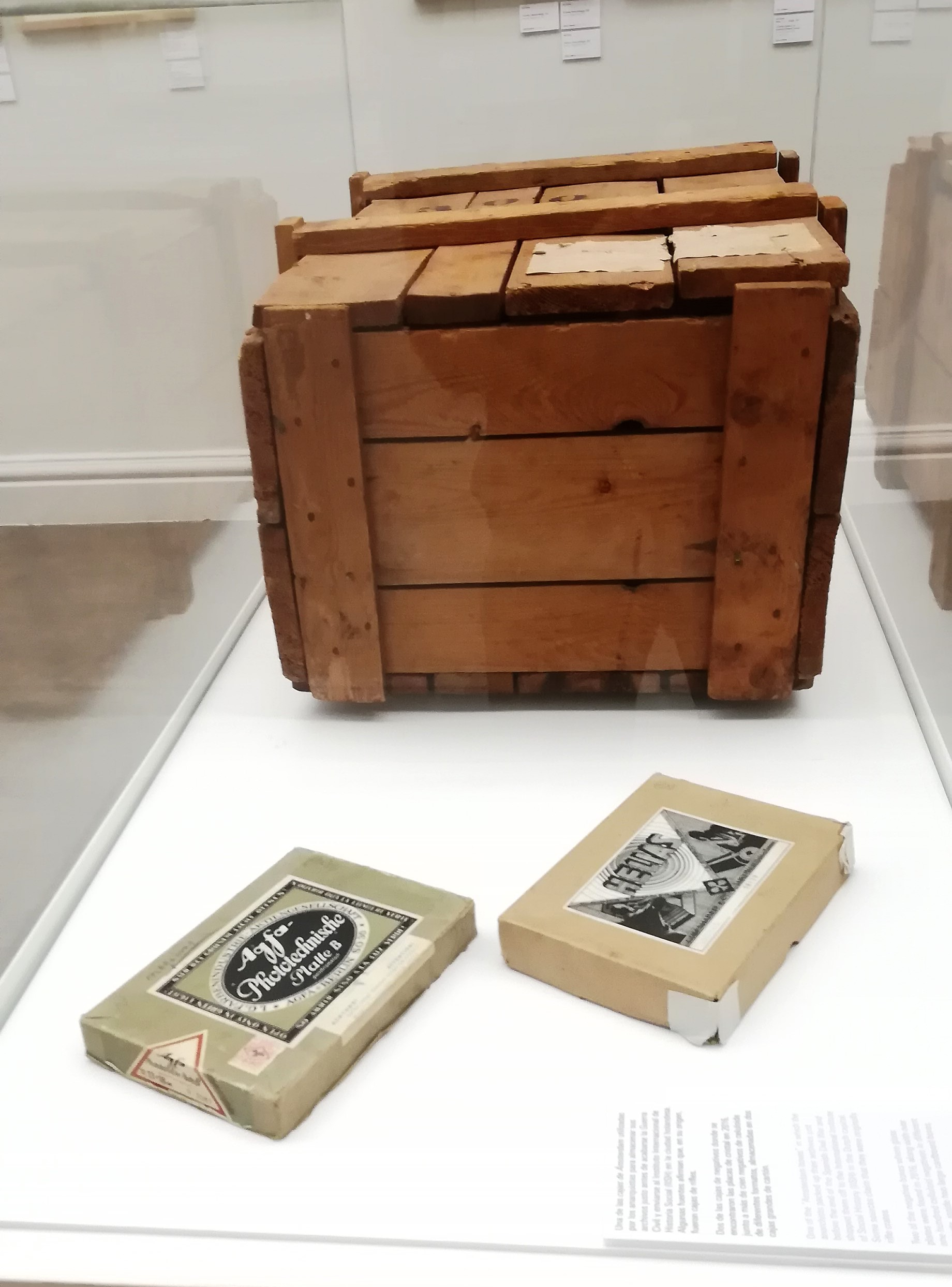
Historical crate and paper boxes for photographs from Spanish Civil War

During the Spanish Civil War, she used her Leica camera in Barcelona and other places in Catalonia for the public relations office of the anarchist movement CNT-FAI (Confederación Nacional del Trabajo and Federación Anarquista Ibérica). These were used by the propaganda commissariat of the CNT-FAI in an effort to encourage morale and action in their fight against the Spanish Fascist movement. At the end of the civil war, her photographs along with other documents were shipped in wooden crates to the International Institute of Social History (IISH) in Amsterdam. Overlooked and forgotten in the crates, her and fellow photographer Kati Horna's photographs were only rediscovered after 80 years by Spanish art historian and curator Almudena Rubio. Most of these pictures had never been published and were presented for the first time in an exhibition in Madrid during the PhotoEspaña festival in June 2022.

Among Michaelis's pictures are scenes of street actions by anarchist militants, views of daily life in Barcelona and Catalonian villages, rare photographs of the veteran anarchist Emma Goldman and the arrival of the British Red Cross in Portbou on the border between France and Spain. On the occasion of the Madrid exhibition, Rubio was quoted:

"The legacy of the work of Michaelis and Horna is unique, precisely because it shows us the rearguard revolutionary experience, neglected by official historiography, that was instigated by the anarchists of the CNT-FAI. At the same time, it allows us to reconstruct in more detail the life of the two photographers during the civil war, and better to appreciate their work in antifascist Spain."

== Exhibitions ==
- 1987: Retrospective, National Gallery of Australia
- 1998: Instituto Valenciano de Arte Moderno Centre Julio González, Valencia
- 2005: Retrospective, National Gallery of Australia
