= The Spanish Republic at War, 1936–1939 =

2002 monograph by Helen Graham

- Author: Helen Graham
- Subject: History of Spain
- Publisher: Cambridge University Press
- Publication date: 2002
- Pages: 472

The Spanish Republic at War, 1936–1939 is a 2002 monograph by Helen Graham on the Spanish political left before, during, and after the Second Republic.

== Bibliography ==
- Alpert, Michael (2004). "Review of The Spanish Republic at War, 1936–1939". War in History. 11 (4): 471–473. doi:10.1177/096834450401100419. ISSN 0968-3445. JSTOR 26062003. S2CID 161464794.
- Buchanan, Tom (2004). "Review of The Spanish Republic at War, 1936–1939". History. 89 (1): 159–160. ISSN 0018-2648. JSTOR 24426739.
- Casado, Pablo Gil (2005). "Review of The Spanish Republic at War, 1936-1939". Hispanófila (143): 121–122. ISSN 0018-2206. JSTOR 43807455.
- Ealham, Chris (2007). "'Myths' and the Spanish Civil War: Some Old, Some Exploded, Some Clearly Borrowed and Some Almost 'Blue'". Journal of Contemporary History. 42 (2): 365–376. doi:10.1177/0022009407075769. ISSN 0022-0094. JSTOR 30036448. S2CID 159741385.
- Esenwein, George (2005). "Review of The Spanish Republic at War, 1936–1939". The Journal of Modern History. 77 (2): 468–470. doi:10.1086/431860. ISSN 0022-2801. JSTOR 10.1086/431860.
- Frank, Willard C. (2004). "Review of The Spanish Republic at War, 1936-1939". The International History Review. 26 (1): 189–191. ISSN 0707-5332. JSTOR 40110491.
- Godicheau, François (2004). "Review of The Spanish Republic at War (1936-1939)". Annales. Histoire, Sciences Sociales. 59 (3): 679–681. doi:10.1017/S0395264900017984. ISSN 0395-2649. JSTOR 27587506. S2CID 165875021.
- Morcillo, Aurora G. (2004). "Review of Republic of Egos: A Social History of the Spanish Civil War; The Spanish Republic at War 1936-1939". Social History. 29 (3): 413–415. ISSN 0307-1022. JSTOR 4287116.
- Núñez, Xosé-Manoel (2004). Lefebvre, Michel; Skoutelsky, Rémi; Graham, Helen; Rodrigo, Javier; Seidman, Michael (eds.). "New Interpretations of the Spanish Civil War". Contemporary European History. 13 (4): 517–527. doi:10.1017/S0960777304001936. ISSN 0960-7773. JSTOR 20081236. S2CID 162229958.
- Ortiz, David (2003). "Review of The Spanish Republic at War, 1936-1939". Arizona Journal of Hispanic Cultural Studies. 7: 296–297. ISSN 1096-2492. JSTOR 20641679.
- Richards, Michael (2004). Graham, Helen; Seidman, Michael (eds.). "Egos and Ideals in the Spanish Civil War". History Workshop Journal. 58 (58): 340–348. doi:10.1093/hwj/58.1.340. ISSN 1363-3554. JSTOR 25472774.
- Robinson, R. A. H. (2004). "Review of The Spanish Republic at War, 1936-1939". The Journal of Military History. 68 (3): 985–986. doi:10.1353/jmh.2004.0141. ISSN 0899-3718. JSTOR 3396767. S2CID 162372010.
- Schauff, Frank (2005). "Review of The Spanish Republic at War 1936-1939". International Review of Social History. 50 (1): 118–119. doi:10.1017/S0020859005101874. ISSN 0020-8590. JSTOR 44582883.
- Seidman, Michael (2004). "Review of The Spanish Republic at War, 1936–1939". The Historian. 66 (4): 871–872. ISSN 0018-2370. JSTOR 24453019.
- Shubert, Adrian (2004). "Reviews of Books". The American Historical Review. 109 (2): 622–623. doi:10.1086/530505. ISSN 0002-8762. JSTOR 10.1086/530505.
