= Jaume Miravitlles =

Catalan writer and politician (1906–1988)

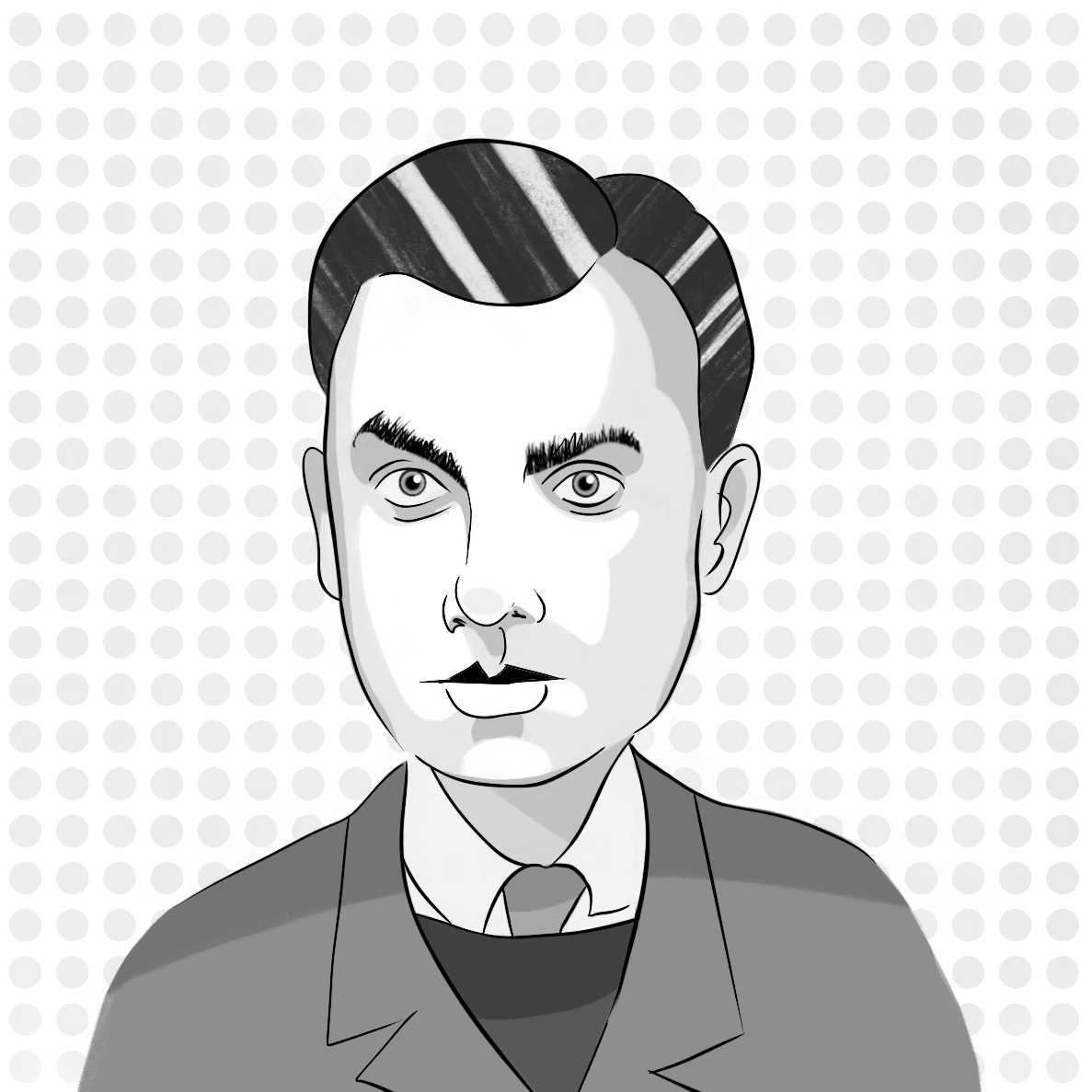
Caricature of Jaume Miravitlles

Jaume "Met" Miravitlles i Navarra (Figueres, 18 February 1906 – Barcelona, 10 November 1988) was a Catalan writer, politician, and journalist. He served as Commissary for Propaganda of the Catalan Government during the Spanish Civil War. He published articles in Nova Ibèria in 1937, a propaganda magazine of the Commissary for Propaganda.

He was an acquaintance of Salvador Dalí and appeared alongside him, as a priest, in the 1929 surrealist film Un Chien Andalou.
