= Helen Graham (historian) =

British historian

Helen Graham (born 1959) is a British historian. She is Professor Emeritus of Modern European History at the Department of History, Royal Holloway University of London. She co-wrote a standard reference work on Spanish cultural studies with Jo Lebanyi, and her introduction to the Spanish Civil War sold more than fifty thousand copies and was translated into five other languages.

== Life ==
Helen Graham was born in Liverpool in 1959. She earned a DPhil at Oxford. She has worked at the University of Southampton, New York University and most recently Royal Holloway University of London, where she is Professor Emeritus of Modern European History in the Department of History.

Her research interests span the social and cultural history of 1930s and 1940s Spain, including the Spanish Civil War; Europe in the inter-war period (1918–1939); comparative civil wars; the social construction of state power in 1940s Spain; women under Francoism; comparative gender history. In 2017 she was awarded a Leverhulme Trust Major Research Fellowship to research Franco’s prisons between 1936 and 1976.

Graham's work has been published widely, including in the Guardian, Independent on Sunday, History Today, BBC History, Literary Review and the London Review of Books. She has written a number of books, including Spanish Cultural Studies with Jo Labanyi, published by Oxford University Press (OUP) in 1995, which became the standard reference work. The 2005 OUP The Spanish Civil War. A Very Short Introduction sold more than 50,000 copies and was translated into Spanish, German, Portuguese, Greek and Turkish.

== Publications ==
Book	Year	Type	Published	Other
The French and Spanish Popular Fronts: Comparative Perspectives	1989	Non-fiction	Cambridge U.P.	with Martin S. Alexander
Socialism and War. The Spanish Socialist Party in Power and Crisis 1936-1939	1991	Non-fiction	Cambridge U.P.	
Spanish Cultural Studies. An Introduction	1995	Non-fiction	Oxford U.P.	with Jo Labanyi
Spain 1936. Resistance and revolution. The Flaws in the Front in Opposing Fascism	1999	Non-fiction	Cambridge U.P.	eds Tim Kirk & Anthony McElligott
The Spanish Republic at War, 1936–1939	2002	Non-fiction	Cambridge U.P.	
The Spanish Civil War. A Very Short Introduction	2005	Non-fiction	Oxford U.P.	
"The memory of murder: mass killing, incarceration and the making of Francoism"	2008	Non-fiction		in War Memories, Memory Wars. Political Violence in Twentieth-Century Spain
Interrogating Francoism: History and Dictatorship in Twentieth-Century Spain	2016	Non-fiction	Bloomsbury Publishing	

Paper	Year	Type	Published	Other
"Against the State: a genealogy of the Barcelona May Days of 1937"	1999		European History Quarterly 29:4 (Oct. 1999) pp. 485–542	
