= Víctor Alba =

Víctor Alba who also went as Pere Pagès i Elies (Barcelona, 1916 – Sant Pere de Ribes, 10 March 2003) was a Spanish anti-Stalinist communist politician, journalist, writer and Spanish university professor.

== Career ==
Alba began to study rights at a young age, beginning his studies at the University of Barcelona. He started his career as a political journalist at a young age. Affiliated with the Bloque Obrero y Campesino (Workers and Peasants' Bloc, BOC), he later worked for the Workers' Party of Marxist Unification (POUM) when the BOC combined with it. During the Spanish Civil War, he was the director of La Batalla, the organ of expression for the POUM. After the capture of the Basque region by Francoist forces in May 1937 he was arrested and jailed for six years in Valencia. After leaving prison, he went into exile in France, where he worked alongside Albert Camus, and in 1947 moved to Mexico, where he published various works. In Mexico he began a prolific literary production, in Spanish, French, Catalan and English, and became director of the Social Training center. In 1957, he moved north to the United States, working with various international groups and became a professor of the University of Kansas and in the Kent State University in Ohio. Initially identifying as a Marxist, he adopted social-democratic and anti-communist views during his exile.

In 1974 he retired from Kent State University, returning to Spain where he died in 2003.

== Bibliography ==
Alba wrote many works in various languages:

- Els supervivents. Ed. Catalonia. México, DF, 1950. Novela sobre la Barcelona de posguerra. Reeditada en Barcelona, 1996.
- Historia del comunismo en América Latina. Ed. Occidentales. México DF, 1953.
- Mexicanos Para La Historia Biblioteca Minima Mexicana 1955
- The Latin Americans. Praeger, Nueva York, 1969
- Retorn a Catalunya. Portic, Barcelona, 1970.
- Catalunya sense cap ni peus. Portic, Barcelona, 1971.
- Homo sapiens catalanibus. Portic, Barcelona, 1974
- USA, centre de la revolució mundial. Portic, Barcelona, 1974.
- Catalonia. A Profile. Praeger, Nueva York, 1975
- El pájaro africano. Planeta, Barcelona, 1975. Novela finalista del Premio Planeta de 1975.
- El marxisme a Catalunya. 1919–1939. I-Historia del BOC. II-Historia del POUM. III-Andreu Nin. IV-Joaquim Maurín, Pòrtic, Barcelona, 1974–1975.
- Els problemes del moviment obrer de Catalunya. Portic, Barcelona, 1976.
- Historia de la resistencia antifranquista, 1939–1955. Planeta, Barcelona, 1978.
- Todos somos herederos de Franco. Planeta, Barcelona, 1979
- Sísifo y su tiempo. Laertes. Barcelona, 1996. Memorias.

== Books ==
Victor Alba created many works including journals, articles, and books. Many have also been reviewed by organizations. The Hispanic American Historical Review analyzes the book The Mexicans. The Making of a Nation by Victor Alba. It is written that Alba gives a good approach on not emphasizing winners or losers in his book. On the other hand, he is mostly weak on highlighting political conflicts and unfolding national ideals. The reviewer of this book mentions another flaw on how Alba lacks emotional representation towards English readers and that it lacks relevant facts and reliable research. It is mostly about his personal opinions about the longing for an independent nation for Mexico. Although, Victor Alba is highly praised by the reviewer for being able to create a readable text because of his journalistic skills. He is also best at discussing political issues like the labor movement, the Leftist Movement, and many other major problems being faced in cases related to Latin America.

== Articles ==
"The Mexican Revolution and the Cartoon" is an article written by Victor Alba that discusses the influences cartoons made against political figures. In this essay, Alba expresses the media being used to provoke and attack an individual or an idea. Cartoons in Mexico were influenced by many countries, but it slowly developed into something different that came to be known as an original Mexican style. There are two ways cartoonists approach this media. The first approach Victor Alba mentions is symbolic cartoon. This media is aimed at those with less cultural or educational knowledge. More specifically, it is aimed at those who are incapable of understanding complex issues regarding political life. Portrait cartoons depict reality and demonstrates them to audiences with more interpretation. Alba describes the usage of these medias to fight against political leaders rather than social issues. After the Mexican Revolution, he acknowledges that political cartoons turned into social cartoons (cartoons revolving around social matters). Social cartoons were mostly created to criticize the community of middle class Mexicans who have suddenly become dominant. With the points discussed in Victor Alba's article, he conveys how modern cartoons have become more effective in contributing to the growth of the Mexican nation and rising self-awareness by publishing the issues on social life.

"The Chinese in Latin America" is also a famous article written by Victor Alba that discusses the influence that China had on Latin America to lead them forward towards a Revolution. Alba considers the effects of propaganda usage in China to promote their growth and success in the nation. In addition, they invited many influential guests to look at their empire, this includes journalists, representatives, artists, and more. Victor Alba points out that the goal China was trying to accomplish was to serve as an influence to change Latin America in order for them to create the same performance as China. In the article, Alba also describes the relationship between China and Cuba. As mentioned in Alba's work, China has helped Cuba in a significant way because both countries could relate to the problems they were facing against North America. In the end, Alba expresses that not only did China place a good reputation on Latin America, but they have also been able to strengthen the Hispanic nation.

"The Lessons of the Collectives" was the last work published by Victor Alba before his death. In this text, he predicts that people will come into groups to fight for the desire for more wealth. Firstly, he mentions how many workers who were in the enterprise committees had to pay a price after the civil war by being imprisoned and facing harsh working conditions. The reason for this was because their chief became jealous of their workers’ success (most of them had businesses that were growing rapidly). Many enterprise committees were also oppressed by communists and republicans. These parties were being blackmailed by the Soviet to keep the collectives silent if they wished to proceed with the provision of weapons and services. With military support from the Soviet, many workers from the enterprise committee could not defend the collectives. To change the inequality between social classes, Victor Alba explains that people must make the effort to change collectivized enterprises while also not becoming like those who seek power and wealth. To do so, Alba mentions that people must be attentive to avoid using the influences of capitalists when dealing with businesses, be aware of the heart's desire for profit, change social norms and values to form equity with the people, and provide skills for workers so that they can take on responsibility and create independence. In the end Victor alba expresses the need to be prepared for the future opportunities that will be provided to accomplish collectivization. To do this, one must learn from past experiences and create strategic plans to turn their expectations into reality.
