= Réalville =

- Commune
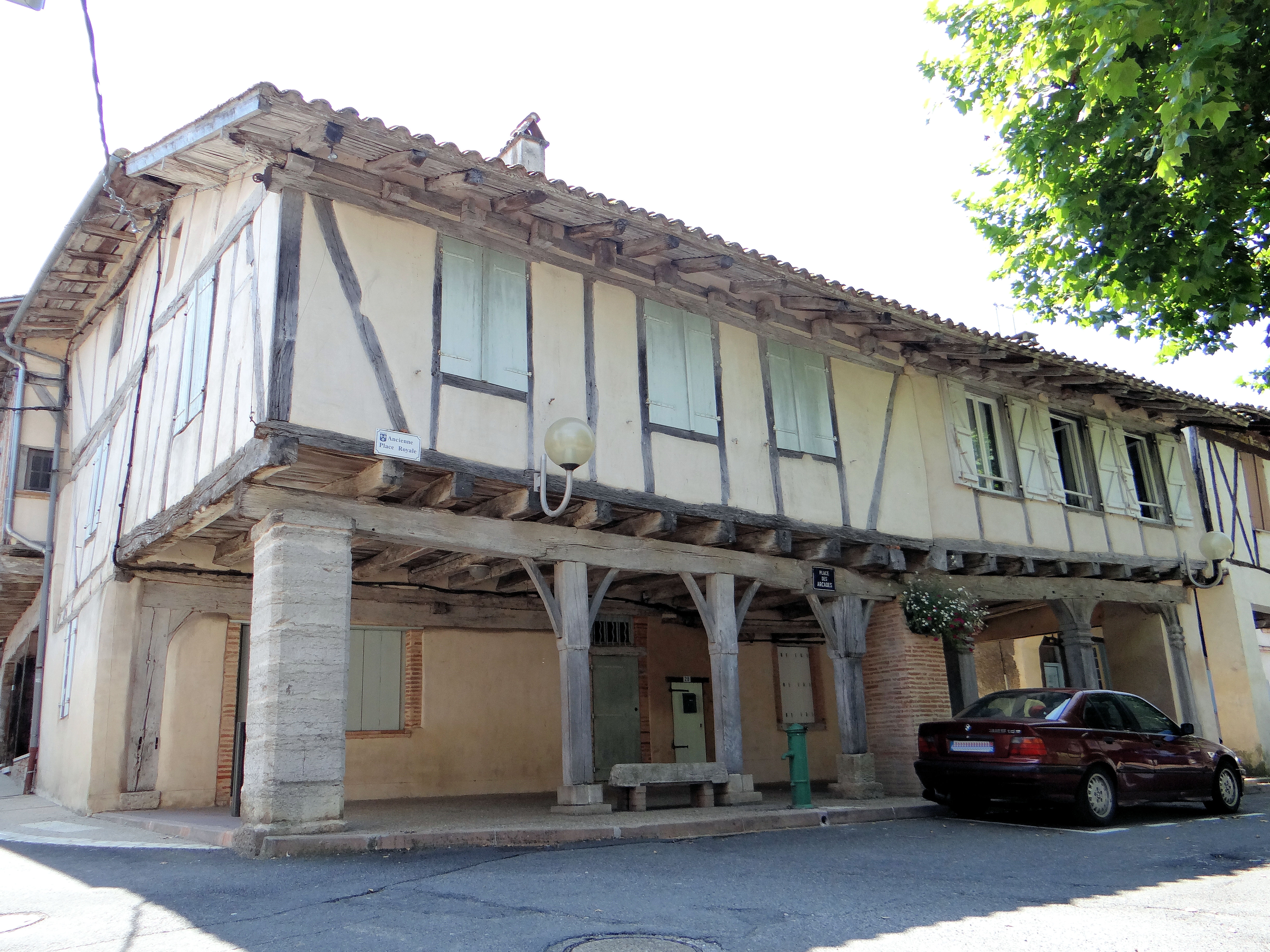
- The Place de Arcades, in Réalville

- Coat of arms
- Location of Réalville
- Location within France Location within Occitanie
- Coordinates: 44°06′56″N 1°28′49″E
- Country: France
- Region: Occitania
- Department: Tarn-et-Garonne
- Arrondissement: Montauban
- Canton: Quercy-Aveyron
- Intercommunality: Quercy caussadais

Government
  - Mayor (2020–2026): André Mourgues
- Area^{1}: 25.09 km^{2} (9.69 sq mi)
- Elevation: 40 m (130 ft)
- Highest elevation: 210 m (690 ft)
- Lowest elevation: 79 m (259 ft)
- Population (2023): 1,869
  - Density: 74.49/km^{2} (192.9/sq mi)
- Time zone: UTC+01:00 (CET)
  - Summer (DST): UTC+02:00 (CEST)
- INSEE/Postal code: 82149 /82440
- ^{1} French Land Register data, which excludes lakes, ponds, glaciers > 1 km^{2} (0.386 sq mi or 247 acres) and river estuaries.

Réalville (French pronunciation: [ʁealvil]. Occitan: Realvila) is a commune in the Tarn-et-Garonne department in the Occitanie region in southern France.

== History ==
The town was founded by King Philip the Fair and built instead of Gardemont; it replaced what existed in Almont, which was then demolished and whose materials were used in part for the construction of the new town. Philip the Fair gave Réalville a Charter of Customs by a decree dated at Poissy in January 1310, the date considered to be that of the founding of the city.

From 1939 to 1940, an Internment camp of France was established on the municipal territory, hosting the 533rd and 534th Foreign workers groups, until June 1940.

== See also ==
- Communes of the Tarn-et-Garonne department
