= Ballobar =

Ballobar Vallobar
- municipality
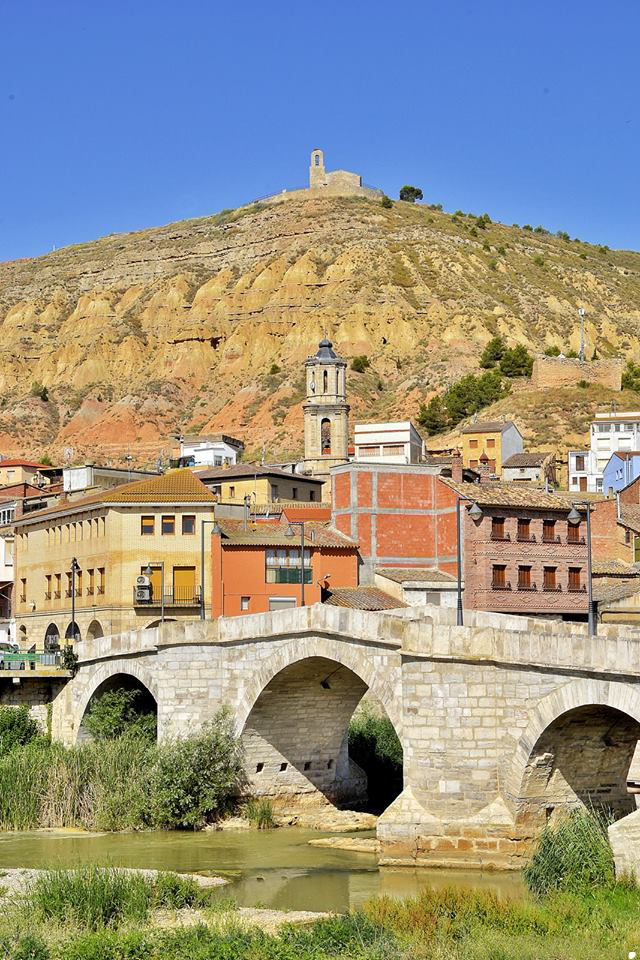

- Flag Coat of arms

- Location within Aragon Location within Spain
- Coordinates: 41°37′N 0°12′E
- Country: Spain
- Autonomous community: Aragon
- Province: Huesca
- Comarca: Bajo Cinca

Area
  - Total: 127.73 km^{2} (49.32 sq mi)
- Elevation: 154 m (505 ft)

Population (2025-01-01)
  - Total: 862
- Demonym: Ballobarino / Ballobarina
- Time zone: UTC+1 (CET)
  - Summer (DST): UTC+2 (CEST)

Ballobar (Spanish: [baˈʎoβaɾ]) (Aragonese Vallobar) is a municipality in the province of Huesca, Spain. As of 2010, it has a population of 981 inhabitants.

== See also ==
- List of municipalities in Huesca
