= Burnett Bolloten =

British writer and scholar

Burnett Bolloten in 1980.

Burnett Bolloten (1909 – October 27, 1987) was a British-born American writer and scholar of the Spanish Civil War.

== Early life ==
The son of a Liverpool jeweler, he was born in the United Kingdom. Not wishing to follow his father's career, he began to travel around the Mediterranean. While on vacation in Barcelona, he was witness to the outbreak of the Spanish Civil War, a conflict that he covered as correspondent for the United Press agency.

== Spanish Civil War ==
While initially a supporter but not a militant of the Spanish Communist Party, he became disappointed with it during the course of the war. He eventually came to the conclusion that the party had betrayed the republic.

== Historian ==
After the war, he moved to Mexico and spent several years there with his first wife, Gladys Evie Green. There, he interviewed refugees of the conflict and put together material about the war. That material is now held at the Hoover Institution of Stanford University.

After separating from his wife, he in 1949 immigrated to the United States and settled in Sunnyvale, California. For many years, he worked as an historian and a real estate broker.

== Death ==
Bolloten died of prostate cancer in Sunnyvale, California in October 1987.

== Works ==
He wrote three volumes about the Spanish Civil War:

- The Grand Camouflage. The Communist conspiracy in the Spanish Civil War (1961)
- The Spanish Revolution: The Left and the struggle for power during the Civil War (1979)
- The Spanish Civil War: Revolution and Counterrevolution (1991)

Bolloten's work had a great influence on other North American Hispanists like Stanley G. Payne as well as on the historiography of the war in Spain itself. His research on the revolution of 1936 has been followed by a good number of specialists in this period of Spanish history.
