= Milicianas in the Spanish Civil War =

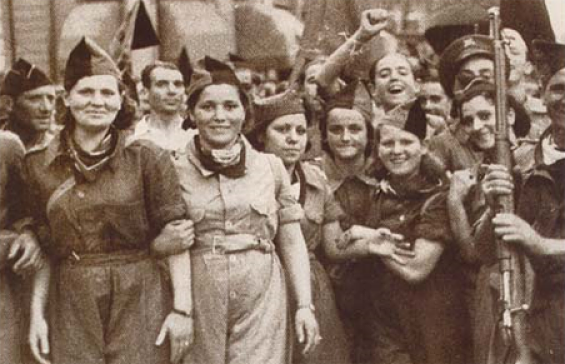
Anarchist milicianas during the Spanish Revolution of 1936

Milicianas, female fighters, fought in the Spanish Civil War. They came from a culture with iconic fighters, and where women had been recently empowered through direct political engagement in political organizations and labor unions. The Dictatorship of Primo de Rivera saw women take more to the streets to protest and riot, though their actions were dismissed by male political leaders. The establishment of the Second Spanish Republic fostered an environment that encouraged active political participation across Spanish society, ultimately aiding many women in their decision to join the front lines, as the government expanded women's rights, including the right to vote, divorce, attend school, and run for office.

The Asturian miners' strike of 1934, three years into the Republic's history, saw women mobilized on a battlefront where they defended the rights of striking miners. This created paranoia on the right that women would take up arms and dispense with male leadership. Two years later, the Spanish Civil War started in Melilla and soon expanded nationwide. Women rose up to defend the Republic, playing a critical role in making the war a protracted affair. The start of the Civil War saw women mobilized in militias affiliated with unions and political organizations, with over 1,000 women joining up in the opening months to serve on the front lines of the Republican side. Unlike men, women actively sought out this choice. Communists and anarchists would make up the bulk of women on the front. Women also came from abroad to fight in the International Brigades.

On the front, women served alongside men in mostly mixed-gendered battalions, and were transferred around Spain. Despite a desire for combat, some of those in male leadership positions made them serve in support roles. Women were killed and injured on the front. The first Spanish Republican woman to die on the battlefield was Lina Ódena on 13 September 1936. They were on the front from July 1936 to March 1937, when they were officially demobilized. This decision was made by male political and military leaders, who were threatened by their presence. The decision was opposed by the women themselves.

The valuable contributions of Republican women fighters has been under reported, and women's own stories have frequently been ignored. This was a result of sexism, women fearing torture and death, and lack of primary sources.

== Prelude to the Second Republic (1800 - 1922) ==
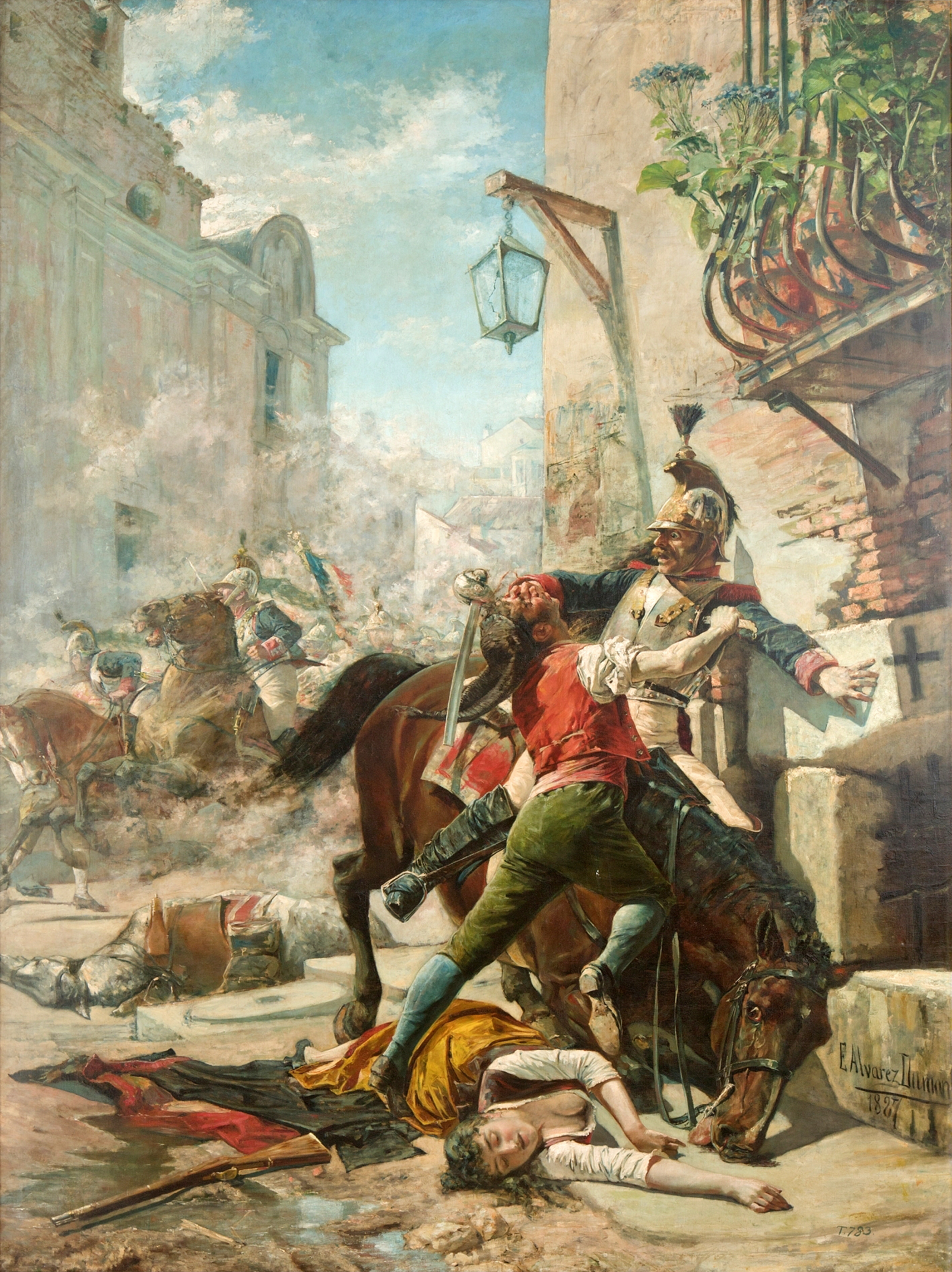
Malasaña y su hija by Eugenio Álvarez Dumont. The piece shows the moment in which the guerrilla Juan Malasaña kills the French dragoon who has just murdered his daughter, the embroiderer Manuela Malasaña who supplied her father with gunpowder and ammunition to fire on French troops from his home during the assault on the Monteleón park.

While women had been sporadically involved in combat in Spain, no large organized force of female fighters (Spanish: miliciana) had been mobilized in the prelude to the Second Republic. Notable women who had participated in the past included Napoleon resistance fighter Agustina de Aragón, Manuela Malasaña and Clara del Rey during the Peninsular War. During the Peninsular War, a writer for the La Gaceta de Madrid would ask why the city's women fighters exceeded their men in courage. Despite their status as national icons, these women were the exception to the rule about women's roles in war in this period.

Still, this period would start to set the stage for women's later involvement. Women continued to be locked out politically, and created auxiliary organizations to male dominated ones in order to be politically engaged in ideologies like socialism and anarchism. Depending on the level of acceptance from these groups and unions, women moderated their voices accordingly. As a consequence, when the Civil War came, anarchist women headed to the front lines in greater numbers than socialist women, as their political involvement was greater and more direct.

== Dictatorship of Primo de Rivera (1923-1930) ==
When political activity occurred by women during the Dictatorship of Primo de Rivera, it was often spontaneous. Despite an increasing presence on the streets, women were often ignored by left-wing male political leaders who purported to support their cause. Despite this, women were increasingly involved in riots and protests, representing increased political awareness of their need to be more active in social and political spheres to enact change to improve their lives. Their participation politically though did not yet involve taking up arms against or in support of the government.

The abdication of Spain's king in 1930 would spell the end of the dictatorship of Miguel Primo de Rivera, and usher in the era of the Second Republic.

== Second Spanish Republic (1931 - 1937) ==
The rights women attained under the constitution of the Second Republic played a role in encouraging active participation in broader Spanish society, and ultimately served to assist many women in their decision later to head to the front. The rights included in the constitution included universal suffrage, the ability to run for office, employment in government offices without regards to gender during the hiring process, access to unified education across all levels, and divorce. The first elections in the Second Republic saw three women elected to office, before women had achieved the right to vote.

The Second Republic also heralded in a period of the creation of numerous women's political organizations across the political spectrum all around Spain. Committee of Women against War and Fascism (Spanish: Asociación de Mujeres contra la Guerra y el Fascismo) was created in 1933, with support from Partido Comunista de España (PCE) and Dolores Ibárruri acting as its major driver. It soon attracted women from across the political spectrum.

Existing tensions within the anarchist movement, as a result of deliberate exclusion or discouragement by male leadership, eventually led to the creation of Mujeres Libres by Lucía Sánchez Saornil, Mercedes Comaposada and Amparo Poch y Gascón in May 1936, shortly before the start of the Civil War. Initially based in Madrid and Barcelona, the organization had the purpose of seeking emancipation for women. Their goals also included "to combat the triple enslavement to which (women) have been subject: enslavement to ignorance, enslavement as women and enslavement as workers". Anarchists activity during the Second Republic, including classes on ideology, would be the roots from which many militia women (Spanish: milicianas) emerged.

=== October Revolution of 1934 ===
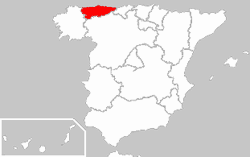
Location of Asturias, Spain.

Women played roles behind the scenes in one of the first major conflicts of the Second Republic, when workers' militias seized control of the mines in Asturias. Originally planned as a nationwide strike, the workers collective action only really took place in Asturias. Some women were involved in propaganda others in assisting the miners, and some in active combat confrontation. After the government quelled the insurrection by bringing in Moroccan legionaries, some 30,000 people found themselves in prison and another 1,000 were put into graves. A large number of those put into prison were women.

During fighting in Oviedo, women were on the battlefield serving in a variety of roles. At least one attended to the wounded while shelling went on around her. Others took up arms. Still more went from leftist position to leftist position with active shelling happening, providing fighters with food and motivational speeches. Aída Lafuente was among the Spanish women who took part in militant labor action in October 1934 in Asturias.

The Asturian conflict saw few instances of women initiated violence. This fed into paranoia among those on the right that women would violently try to seize power from men. Both on the left and the right, people viewed these women as heroic, and men wanted to limit their potential for further political action. Women were also involved in building barricades, clothing repair, and street protests. For many women, this was the first time they were civically engaged without a male chaperone as in many cases these women were working on behalf of imprisoned male relatives. Women were also killed in this conflict. Aída Lafuente was active on the front, and died during the Asturian conflict. The actions of women attached to Asociación de Mujeres contra la Guerra y el Fascismo in the event led to the organization being declared illegal later in the year. To get around this, the women re-organized as Organización Pro Infancia Obrera.

More recently, academics have debated if the Asturian miners' strike represented the real start of the Spanish Civil War. Imagery from the conflict was subsequently used by both sides for propaganda to further their own agenda, particularly inside PSOE who saw it the situation as a call for political unity on the left if they were to have any hope of countering the rise of fascism in Spain. PSOE consequently used a lot of gendered imagery to sell people on their ideas. Propaganda used featuring the events in October 1934 featured women in gender conforming ways that did not challenge their roles as feminine. This was done by male leadership with the intention of counteracting the image of strong women political leaders, who unnerved many on the right. Right wing propaganda at the time featured women as vicious killers, who defied gender norms to eliminate the idea of Spanish motherhood.

=== Start of the Civil War ===
Location of Melilla, where Nationalist forces started their campaign in 1936.

On 17 July 1936, the Unión Militar Española launched a coup d'état in North Africa and Spain. They believed they would have an easy victory. They failed to predict the people's attachment to the Second Republic. With the Republic largely maintaining control over its Navy, Franco and others in the military successfully convinced Adolf Hitler to provide transport for Spanish troops from North Africa to the Iberian peninsula. These actions led to a divided Spain, and the protracted events of the Spanish Civil War. It would not officially end until 1 April 1939.

Franco's initial coalition included monarchists, conservative Republicans, Falange Española members, Carlist traditionalist, Roman Catholic clergy and the Spanish army. They had support from Fascist Italy and Nazi Germany. The Republican side included Socialists, Communists, and various other left wing actors.

The military revolt was announced on the radio across the country, and people took to the streets immediately as they tried to determine the extent of the situation, and if it was a military or political conflict. Dolores Ibárruri would soon coin the phrase "¡No pasarán!" a few days later, on 18 July 1936 in Madrid while on the radio from the Ministry of the Interior's radio station, saying, "It is better to die on your feet than live on your knees. ¡No pasarán!"

At the start of the Civil War, there were two primary anarchist organizations: Confederación Nacional del Trabajo (CNT) and the Federación Anarquista Ibérica (FAI). Representing working-class people, they set out to prevent the Nationalists from seizing control while also serving as reforming influences inside Spain.

Great Britain, France, Germany, Italy and the Soviet Union signed the Non-Intervention Treaty in August 1936, promising not to provide material support for the war to any of the parties, even as Germany and Italy were already and continued to provide support to the Nationalist faction.

== Spanish Civil War (1936 - 1939) ==
=== Background ===
Because of changes in society, women who wanted to be involved in the war against the Rebel forces had two options: they could fight on the front lines or they could serve in auxiliary roles away from the front. Their options were not limited, like that of many women near the battlefields of World War I, where the only available role was that of auxiliary role to support men on the front.

Asociación de Mujeres contra la Guerra y el Fascismo underwent a second name change in 1936, shortly after the start of the Civil War. Their new name was Agrupación de Mujeres Antifascistas. From there, the group would play a prominent role in sending and supporting women on the front lines in the war. At the same time that the new Agrupación de Mujeres Antifascistas was readying for war, many women's organizations on both the right and the left were shutting down.

=== Mobilization ===
The Spanish Civil War started on 17 July 1936 with a coup d'état. The military revolt that started the civil war did not immediately succeed in part because of women who took part in spontaneous uprisings.

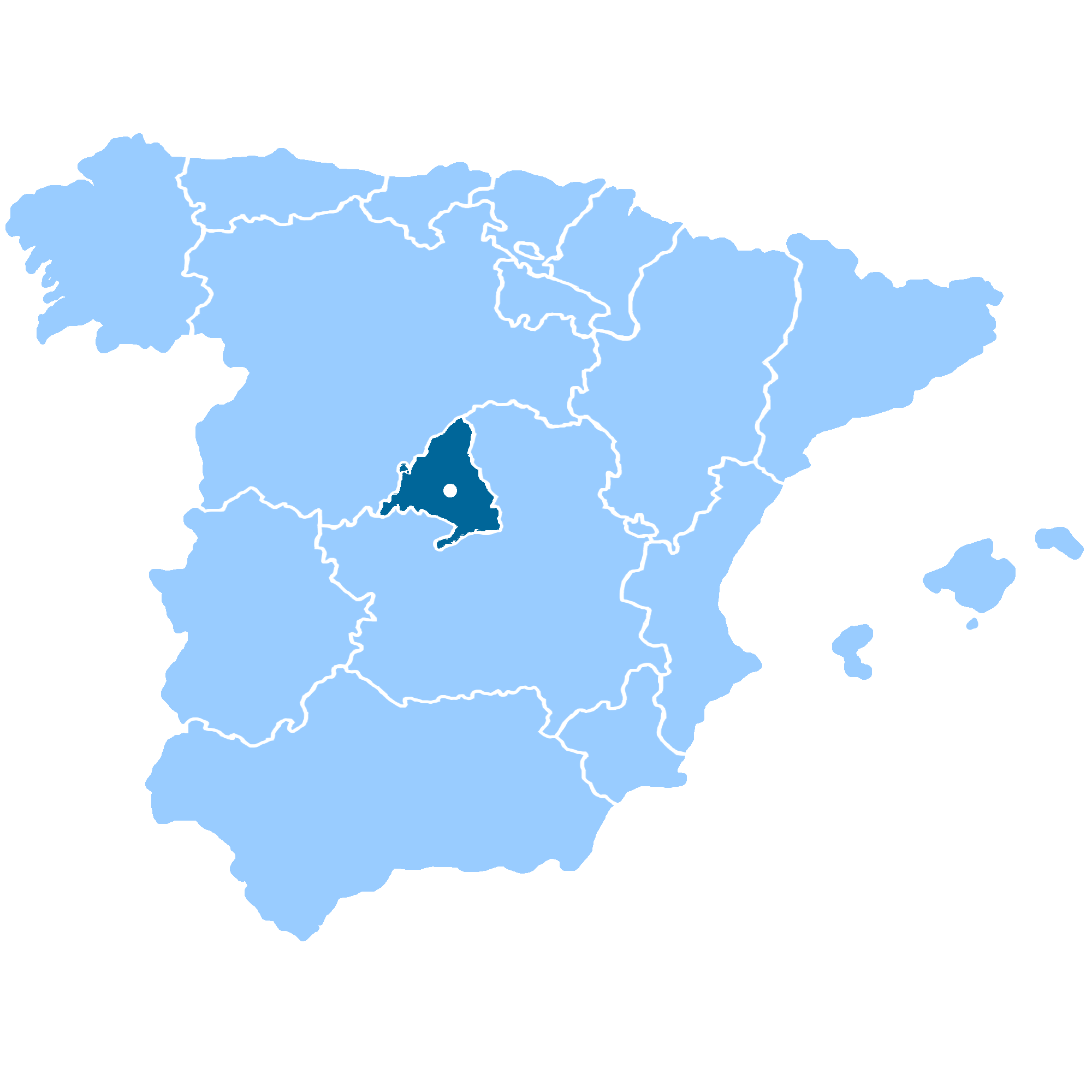
Location of Madrid, Spain's capital city, where many women were mobilized to defend the home front.

One of the most important mass mobilizations of women in Spain's history was their participation on the anti-Nationalist front. Shortly after the start of the Civil War, around 1,000 Spanish women volunteered to serve on the front lines of the Republican side. One of the cities that saw the greatest number of armed women rise to its defense was Madrid. This quick mobilization of women was part of the reason that the Nationalists did not gain a quick victory, and the war became a more protracted affair.

Most of the militias that were created during the immediate outbreak of the Civil War came from civil society groups like trade unions and political parties. CNT, UGT and other unions stepped in to provide logistical support for many of these militias. The number of women mobilized was never high. Most joined in order to further support political ideologies they supported. Most came from militant libertarian organizations like CNT, FAI and FIJL. These militias often lacked the typical military structure in order to better represent their ideologies and better mobilize local populations.

Women were not actively recruited to serve in militias. Rather, they actively sought out places to enlist. Unlike men, women had the choice to fight and made that choice. Their efforts were often difficult, as many militias rejected them on basis of their gender, and they were constantly asked to prove themselves more than men on front.

Other women called them to the front, including Dolores Ibárruri. In the last days of Republican control of Madrid, she implored both men and women to take to arms against Nationalist forces in the city. The numbers of women mobilized and armed behind the front in support of cities exceeded the numbers who were on the front line. At most, probably 1,000 women fought on the front lines, while several thousand served in city defense. The latter included a women's only battalion that served in Madrid.

Communists and anarchists columns attracted the most women among all the political groups on the Republican front. POUM attracted women fighters, but in smaller numbers. Partido Socialista Obrero Español (PSOE) was one of the only major actors on the left to immediately reject the idea of women participating in combat. The idea was too radical for them, and they believed women should serve as heroes at home, providing support to civilian populations well behind the front lines. Women who were members of PSOE who found their way to combat did so by joining communist and socialist youth groups.

Women also came from abroad to fight as part of the International Brigades, with their total numbers documented at between 400 and 700 women. Many women first traveled to Paris, before going by boat or train to fight. They came from countries like the United States, Poland, France, Russia, Switzerland, England, Norway and Germany. A 1937 agreement designed to stop foreign intervention eventually largely put a stop to recruitment to the International Brigades for both men and women. While the national branches of Communist Party supported sending foreign fighters to Spain to fight in the Civil War in the International Brigades, they often opposed their female members from going. When they sometimes agreed to send determined women to Spain, it was often in support roles as reporters or propagandists. The party apparatus in Spain then actively worked to keep women away from the front.

The first Spanish Republican women to die on the battlefield was Almeria born JSU affiliated miliciana Lina Ódena on 13 September 1936. With Nationalist forces overrunning her position, the unit commander chose to commit suicide rather than to surrender at a battle in Guadix. Her death would be widely shared by both Republican and Falangist propagandists. With Nationalist forces threatening her with the potential of being raped by Moorish soldiers if she does not surrender, Republicans were able to cast her as an innocent who chose death rather than to be debased and lose her honor. Falangist propaganda said there was never there and there was never a threat of rape. This made Ódena's death meaningless. Beyond that, Falangist propaganda implied Ódena had been guilty of murdering a Catholic priest a few weeks prior, with her suicide was a way of escaping punishment.

=== On the front ===
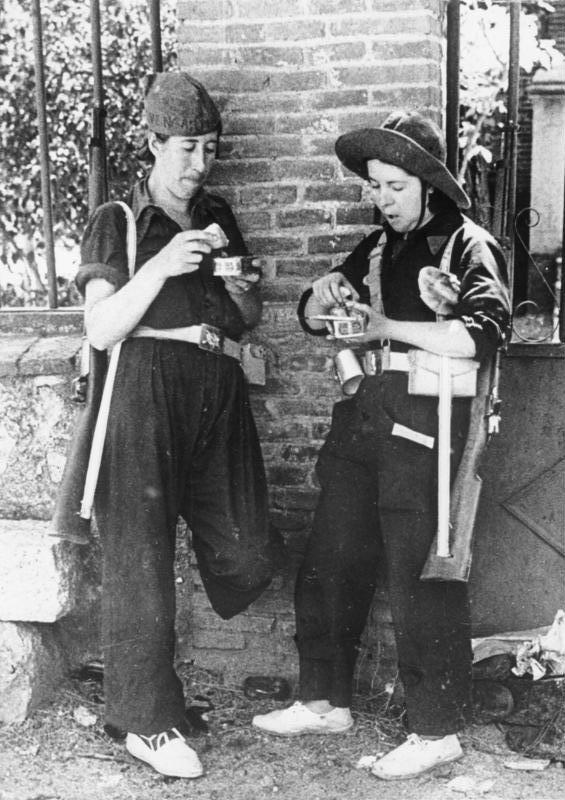
Milicianas with their weapons during the Spanish Civil War.

On the front, the norm was for women to serve in mixed gender battalion units. They were transferred around Spain, depending on military needs for troop reinforcements. Rearguard miliciana groups were more likely to be organized into women only battalions, and were more likely to be based in the same location as part of defensive units. As a consequence, the roles played by each tended to be different.

Women on the front often were faced with a duel burden of being expected to fight and to provide auxiliary support. Male leadership decisions to require this reinforced sexism inside the Republic, by allowing women to break free of gender norms by serving in combat but at the same time forcing them to engage in traditionally gendered tasks. Despite this, they were recognized by their peers for their bravery.

Most women on the front served in militias aligned with some political group. A very small number served as members of the regular Republican army. Members included Esperanza Rodríguez. In the first few months of the war, the Fifth Regiment had the largest contingent of milicianas among all militias. Most of the women serving in front line roles had their positions defined by the communist, anarchist or POUM leadership. Most of these gave women equal roles when it came to combat, and providing the same military contribution. In comparison to men, women on the front were often more expected to take care of injured comrades. This sometimes put them in more harms way, as some women militia members were shot while tending to injured comrades in battle. Women who had to deal with this situation included Josefa Rionda. Captains might also divert women on the battlefield to hospitals, where they expected them to work alongside nurses. In some cases, milicianas were told by column leaders that they were only allowed to remain on the front in support roles for men, by doing working as nurses or teaching largely illiterate militiamen to read. A number of these women left those columns, seeking other units where they could serve in combat. Among the women serving in the international brigades, most worked as nurses, pharmacists or doctors. Some Jewish, Polish and American women did go to Spain, and did serve in combat. They were actively discouraged from doing so by anarchists, and outright banned from doing so by communists.

Combat experience did not significantly differ based on the political affiliation of the battalion that women in combat were attached to. Women proved versatile on the front, able to serve in many different combat roles. Women in rearguard battalions often met daily to practice weapons training, marching and drilling. Many also received specialized training in the use of machine guns. POUM was the only organization that had accepted women and provided them with weapons training. The lack of weapons training by women in other militias would later be used as a reason to try to remove them from the front, even as those militias also failed to prove their male recruits with weapons training.

Milicianas also came from all over Spain, including Madrid, Majorca, Catalonia and Asturias. One miliciana served as captain of the artillery company of the Second Asturias Battalion.

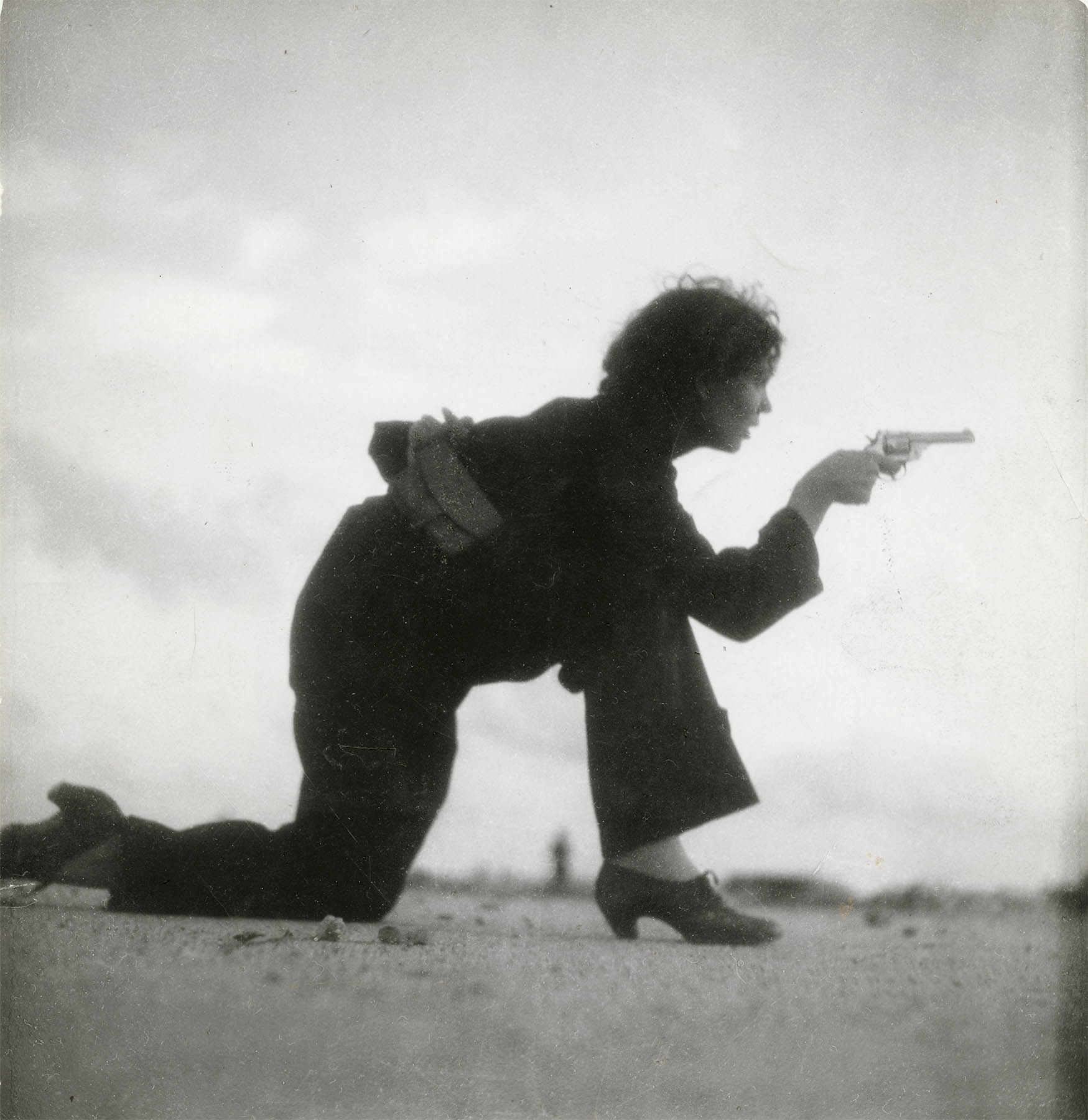
An armed Republican miliciana in 1936 in a photo by Gerda Taro.

These women also came from across the leftist political spectrum. One of the few publicly socialist identified militia women in this period was María Elisa García, who served as a miliciana with the Popular Militias as a member Asturias Battalion Somoza company.

Women were injured on the front. Julia Manzanal was a miliciana who found herself pregnant on the front as a result of her relationship with her boyfriend. She found a midwife, had an abortion in the morning and was back to fighting on the front in afternoon. As a consequence of the abortion, she bled for over a month while in combat. While on the front, Rosario Sánchez had an accident involving an explosive made from a condensed milk jug that led to the amputation of her hand. She almost bled out as a consequence of her wounds, but survived only to later be captured and sent to prison. Steel Battalion Jacinta Pérez was mortally wounded by urged her comrades ahead towards the enemy they were facing.

Women in the Pasionaria Column of the Fifth Regiment of the Popular Militias often tried to transfer out. This was in part because column leaders often tried to keep women out of combat, and instead have them work in support roles for the column that included cook, and cleaning clothes and dishes. Captains in the Column often tried to force women assigned to the Column out.

Some women in the milicianas cut their hair in case of capture. They did not want their heads shaved except for tufts that would then have Nationalist ribbons put in them and then being paraded around a town near where they were captured. Nationalists would frequently execute prisoners of war that had been transported to prison. This included executing pregnant milicianas captured in combat. The threat of rape of female combatants was one used regularly by Nationalist forces to discourage their involvement. It was a very real threat as it happened as a regular feature for both combatant and non-combatant women, with Moorish soldiers being used in some cases to further the debasement of these women soldiers among their battalions and in the wider population. It also served Nationalist forces to remind all women that they were inferior to men, and that men would easily conquer them. Consequently, when women died on the front, their deaths were often treated not as deaths towards a higher purpose, but a personal loss of honor resulting in death. Female fighters caught on the front and given death sentences were often raped before being shot. Franco's treatment of Republican women fighters caught on the front line at times shocked his German allies. He could and did order their execution, and then return to eating breakfast as if nothing special had occurred.

In the last half of 1936, milicianas were not considered exceptional by many of their male colleagues; they served as comrades alongside men in separate or mixed gender battalions. This was in large part because many of the milicianas were motivated to fight because their own revolutionary beliefs: they believed their involvement could change the course of the war, and bring about a new revolution in thinking in society. A few women fought because they were following husbands, fathers or sons into battle. This group though represented a very small minority, with the majority fighting for ideological reasons.

Because women were viewed by some as unnatural participants in battle, women were often suspected of espionage or seeking to betray Republican ideals. They began to become suspect on the battlefield. This paranoia would later play a role in removing women from the front. Milicianas were also suspected of passing along sexually transmitted diseases to men, which resulted in male fighters dying from syphilis. This was perceived as viewing bringing militias into disrepute and harming male readiness for combat. Military and political leaders also slandered milicianas, accusing them of being prostitutes and nymphomaniacs, representing a greater threat to the loyalist forces than the rebel forces they were facing in battle because they spread venereal disease. (Note: Mika Etchebérhère in Ma guerre d'Espagne à moi published in Paris in 1976 contends that some women were straight up prostitutes, encouraged to the front by the presence of single men who had money.) (Note: María de la Luz Mejías Correa in Así fue pasando el tiempo. Memorias de una miliciana extremeña published in 2006 in Seville said that despite going to the front to accompany her husband, local women in the area still called her (incorrectly) a prostitute and a slut. These local women also accused milicianas of spreading venereal disease. While there were some brothels near the front, they were not run by milicianas and de la Luz Mejías Correa contends that men who went to brothels were never accused of spreading venereal disease.) Clara Campoamor would be among a number of voices urging women off the front, accusing women of being prostitutes. When this was shared among milicianas, it made some of their blood boil, as it demonstrated to them that the left was no better than the right when it came to protecting women's rights. Such rationales, along with lack of weapons training, were used to make an argument that women should be removed from the front.

Lina Ódena, Soledad Casilda Méndez, Aída Lafuente, Rosario Sánchez Mora, Concha Lozano and Maruja Tomico were all milicianas who would be immortalized by the Republic during this period of active women's involvement in combat.

==== July 1936 ====
===== Aragon Front =====
The Catalans had their own militia in Aragon, with a small contingent of elite women fighters. The Los Aguiluchos de Les Corts group moved from Barcelona to Caspe on the Aragon front, following their involvement in conflicts in Barcelona. Concha Pérez Collado joined the Ortiz column while in Caspe, going with her new unit to Azaila. Soledad Casilda Méndez served in a militia from the Basque Country, where she was the only woman initially. Involved at the fighting during the last days on the Aragon front, she was one of only two women involved in active combat with her militia.

===== Barcelona Front =====
Unión de Muchachas battalion included two thousand women aged fourteen to twenty-five. They started training in July 1936, when the Civil War began. They were sponsored by the National Confederation for Physical Education, and came from a group of leftist sportspeople who had protested Hitler organizing the 1936 Summer Olympics, and who had organized the People's Olympics in Barcelona that year in protest. The start of the war led to the cancellation of the event, with a number of the participants enlisting in support of the Republic and being involved in the July 1936 defense of Barcelona. This included English woman Felicia Browne. Upon enlisting, she was quoted as saying, "I am a member of the London Communists and I can fight as well as any man". Switzerland's Clara Thalmann was another woman who joined a Republican militia after the cancellation of the Games, volunteering in the Durruti Column.

Concha Pérez Collado was part of Los Aguiluchos de Les Corts, a group of 100 armed soldiers from her Barcelona neighborhood, who joined shortly after the outbreak of the war. Only seven members of the group were women. Shortly after the start of the Civil War, Pérez Collado was part of a group that attacked the Model Prison with a goal of freeing political prisoners housed inside. Later, she was part of a group that took control of a convent. She also assisted in creating barricades in her Barcelona neighborhood. Along with other anarchists, she rode in the back of a pickup truck covered by a mattress and with four guns between them. They went to the Pedralbes Barracks, engaged in fighting there and managed to gain a small cache of weapons. Following this, her group went to Caspe on the Aragon front.

Marina Ginestà i Coloma was another woman on the front in Madrid in July 1937. Originally from France and a member of the Unified Socialist Youth, she joined the war as a reporter when she was only 17 years old. Ginestà i Coloma, working with Mikhail Koltsov, served as a photographer and translator for the Soviet newspaper Pravda. A famous photograph of her at the original Hotel Colón was taken on 21 July 1936. A non-combatant, it was the only time during the war when she handled a weapon.

Lois Orr served in Workers' Party of Marxist Unification (POUM) female militia in Barcelona in the early part of the war.

===== Siege of Cuartel de la Montaña =====
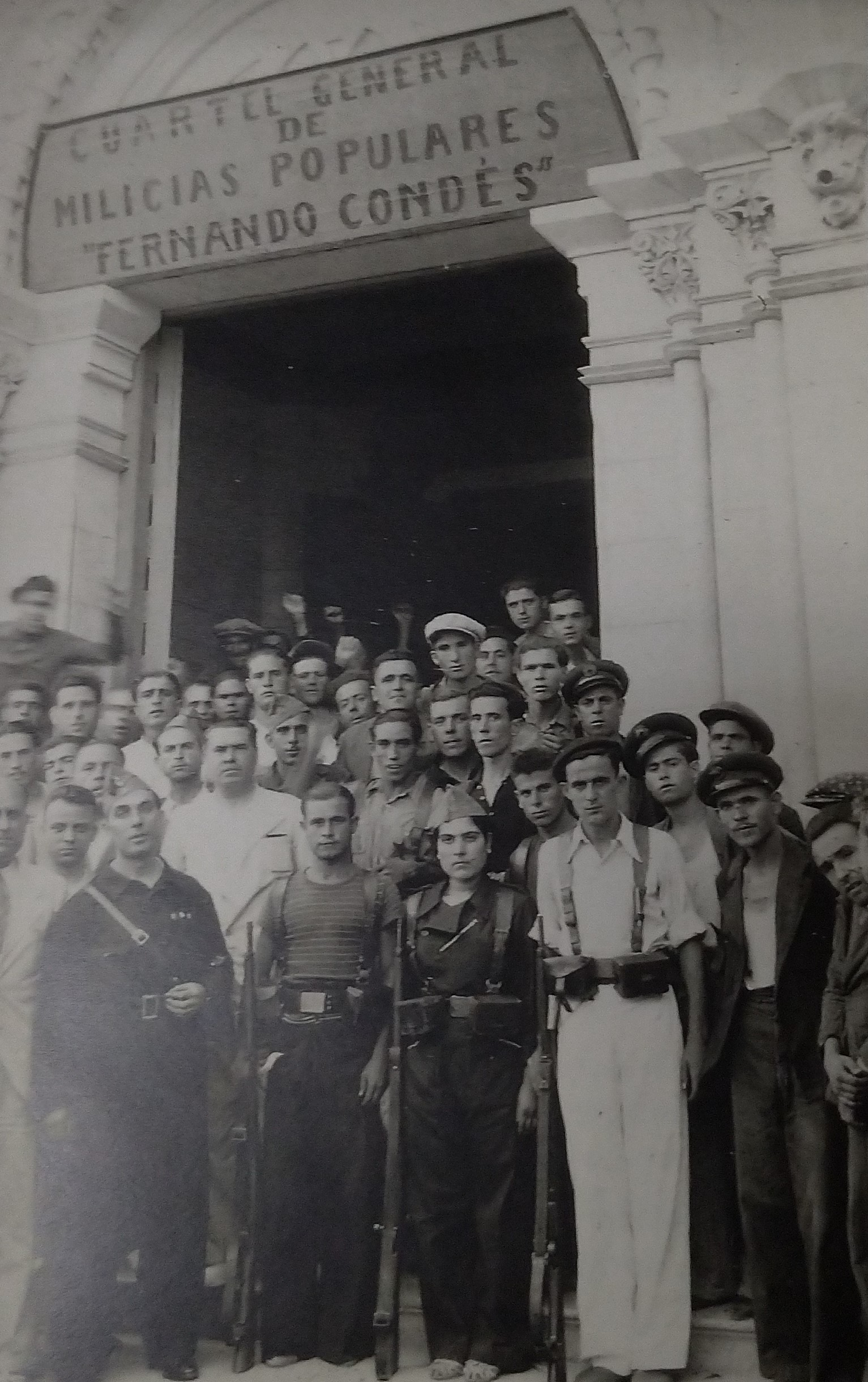
Volunteered of Milicias Populares at Cuartel General "Fernando Condés" during the first days of the war.

Women's only battalions existed behind the front lines as rearguard support in defense of their cities. Barcelona had such a battalion organized by PSUC. In Mallorca, there was the Rosa Luxemburg Battalion, and in Madrid there was the Unión de Muchachas. In the first days of the war, Trinidad Revoltó Cervelló was involved in front line combat at the Military Headquarters and at the Atarazanas Barracks in Barcelona. Pepita Laguarda Batet was also among the women who were involved in July confrontations.

Women were involved in the Montaña Barracks attack. Angelina Martínez was among them. Originally from Madrid, she was a member of Juventudes Socialistas Unificadas. She continued fighting even after most of the men in her unit were killed. Her actions were featured later that month in the newspaper Estampa.

===== Madrid Front =====
POUM initially required both men and women in combat to also engage in support roles as needed. Women were in the trenches and stood guard. Captain Fernando Saavedra of the Sargento Vázquez Battalion said these women fought just like men.

Fidela Fernández de Velasco Pérez had been trained in the use of arms before the start of the war, and served on the front lines right away outside Madrid. She captured a cannon from the Nationalists, before being transferred to the Toledo front. Her new unit was the same one which Rosario Sánchez de la Mora was serving. There, Fernández de Velasco Pérez fought on the front and sought action by going behind enemy lines to sabotage them alongside other shock troops. She learned how to construct bombs.

Rosario Sánchez Mora was one of the first women to join the militias in defense of Madrid following the outbreak of the Spanish Civil War, enlisting as a 17-year-old on 17 July 1936. Teófila Madroñal was another Spanish woman who served on the front lines. She enlisted in Leningrad Battalion during the first days of the war, underwent weapons training and then was deployed to the Estremadura highway during the Siege of Madrid.

When the war broke out, Margarita Ribalta was initially assigned by JSU to a position at headquarters. Unhappy with not being more involved, a few days later she enrolled with a Partido Comunista de España column and was transferred to the front, where she volunteered to be part of an advance group trying to take a hill. She led her group, running between two Nationalist positions while carrying a machine gun. A Republican support plane mistook her group for Nationalists, bombing them and wounding Ribalta.

Argentine born Mika Etchebéhère served in a POUM militia during the Civil War. A self-described Trotskyist, Etchebéhère moved to Madrid from Paris a few days before the outbreak of the War, enlisting immediately and then being deployed as part of the Hipólito Etchebéhère column to the front near Madrid.

==== August 1936 ====
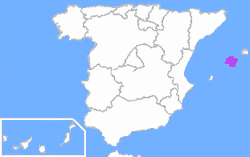
Location of Mallorca, where POUM had a column that included women fighters.

Women were in the rearguard in August 1936, supporting the defense of Barcelona.

===== Battle of Majorca =====
POUM had a column that included milicianas in the Mallorca campaign. Trinidad Revoltó Cervelló joined the Popular Militias and went to the Balaeric Islands, where she again saw front line action at Battle of Mallorca. Catalans also sent 400 fighters to the Balearic Islands front, with 30 of the fighters being milicianas.

In Mallorca, there was the Rosa Luxemburg Battalion that saw action on the front in defense of the city. Women in rearguard battalions often met daily to practice weapons training, marching and drilling. Many also received specialized training in the use of machine guns.

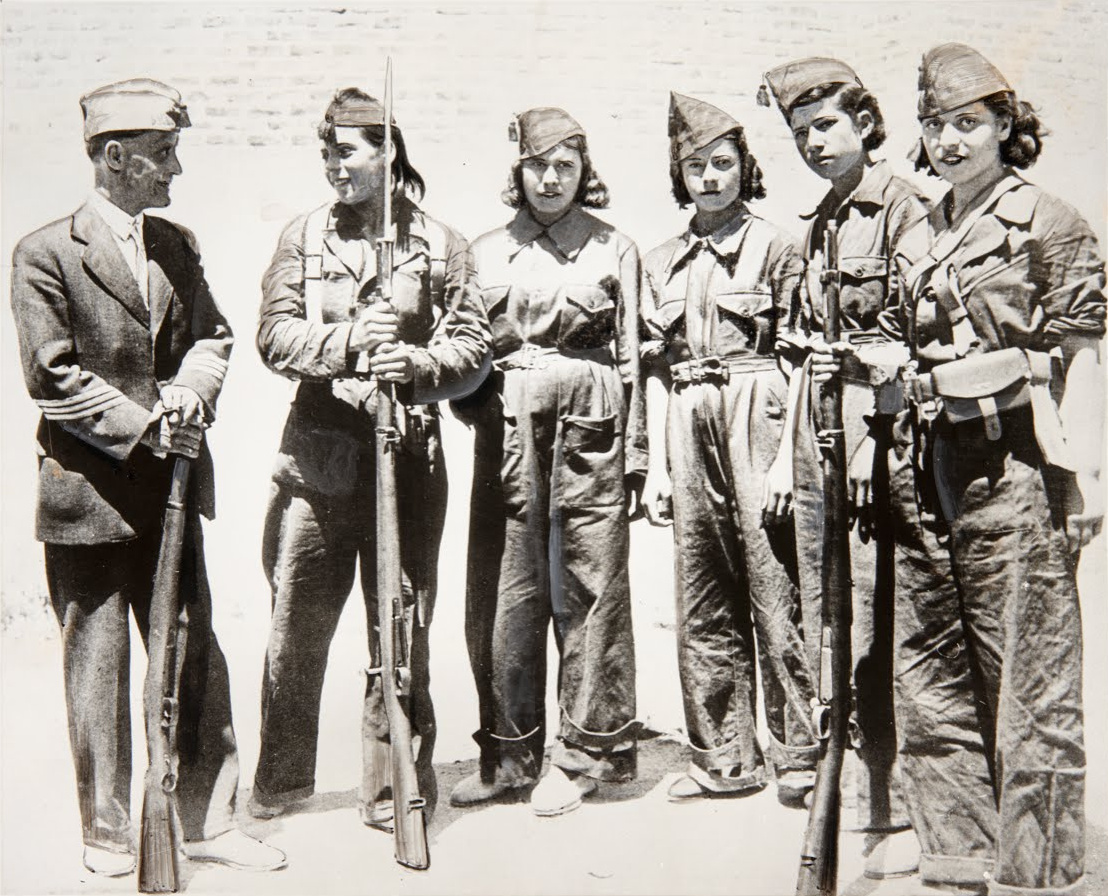
Milicianas in 1936.

===== Siege of Oviedo =====
María Elisa García fought with the Battalion at the Lugones front, and later in the Basque mountains.

===== Aragon Front =====
Felicia Browne, an English artist and communist, served in the international brigades, died on the Aragon front on 25 August 1936. She was the first British volunteer of either sex to die in combat in the war. She died while serving as part of a raiding party that was targeting a train filled with military munitions. The group was ambushed, with some injured. Browne was attempting to aid a wounded Italian comrade when she was shot in the head. Her body had to be left behind and it was not safe enough to retrieve it.

Clara Thalmann, part of Durruti Column, served on the Aragon Front, marching their from Barcelona where she had enlisted.

Concha Pérez Collado's unit stayed in Azaila until they mobilized for the attack on Belchite on 24 August 1936. She remained on the Aragon front for another four months, after which she departed for the Huesca.

Along with her boyfriend Juan López Carvajal, Pepita Laguarda Batet enlisted in the Ascaso Column from where they were deployed to the Aragon front shortly after. Arriving on 19 August 1936 as part of the 45 group, the couple always stayed on the front line. She told her boyfriend shortly after enlisting, ”At Pedralbes, in the Miguel Bakunin barracks, a column is forming to go to the Aragon front, and I have enrolled as a volunteer”. Juan replied : “If you’re going there, I’ll go with you”.

==== September 1936 ====
===== Aragon Front =====
Serving on the outskirts of Huesca, Pepita Laguarda Batet participated in fighting for several hours early on the morning of 1 September. Around 5:00 AM, she received a major wound that would kill her several hours later at 9:30 AM. After being injured, she was quickly transferred to Vicién hospital before again being moved to a hospital in Grañén.

===== Sierra Front =====
In September 1936, the Largo Caballero Battalion which included about ten women, fought on the Sierra front. Those in combat included Josefina Vara.

===== Madrid Front =====
By September, Mika Etchebéhère had become a commander after being promoted as a result of her own commander being killed in battle.

==== October 1936 ====
===== Zaragoza Front =====
The International Group of the Durruti Column had many women serving in it. Involved in fighting in October 1936 at Perdiguera, a group of these women died. The dead included Suzanna Girbe, Augusta Marx, Juliette Baudard, Eugenie Casteu and Georgette Kokoczinski. The next month, Suzanna Hans of the same group died at the battle of Farlete.

===== Siege of Sigüenza =====
Women militants and civilians were part of the group that found themselves trapped for four days at the Sigüenza Cathedral as a result of a Nationalist siege in October 1936. After running out of food and ammo, with the walls of the Cathedral beginning to fall from incessant cannon fire, many in the group decided to make a run for it at night. POUM Captain Mika Feldman de Etchebéhère was among those at the cathedral. She was one of the approximately one third of people who fled who survived. Her bravery during the Siege of Sigüenza earned her a promotion to POUM's Lenin Battalion Second Company Captain. After recovering from the siege in Barcelona, she was ordered to Moncloa, where she was in charge of a special shock troop brigade.

==== November 1936 ====
===== Siege of Madrid =====
While most battalions were mixed gendered, the Women's Battalion organized by the PCE and saw combat on the Madrid front was only women. The battalion was called Batallón Femenino del 5º Regimiento de Milicias Populares. Some women who were already serving as nurses as part of the Fifth Regiment returned from the front specifically to join the women's only battalion. Battalion members would sometimes march down Gran Vía in Madrid in groups of two or three since shelling on the street was too heavy to allow them to march in formation.

Communist women were able to achieve front line leadership roles. 22-year-old Aurora Arnáiz commanded a JSU column during the Siege of Madrid. Julia Manzanal became the Political Commissar for the Batallón Municipal de Madrid when she was only 17. From there, she armed herself with a rifle and a pistol, fighting on the front lines, serving as a guard and engaging in espionage role despite having enlisted initially with the role of educating her comrades in Communist ideology.

By this time, Unión de Muchachas was a communist organized rearguard women's only battalion in Madrid that fought on the front line starting on 8 November 1936. Positioned at Segovia Bridge and near Getafe on the Carabanchel front and representing the bulk of the Republican forces in those positions, Unión de Muchachas fighters were among the last to retreat.

Teófila Madroñal was deployed to the Estremadura highway during the Siege of Madrid.

==== December 1936 ====
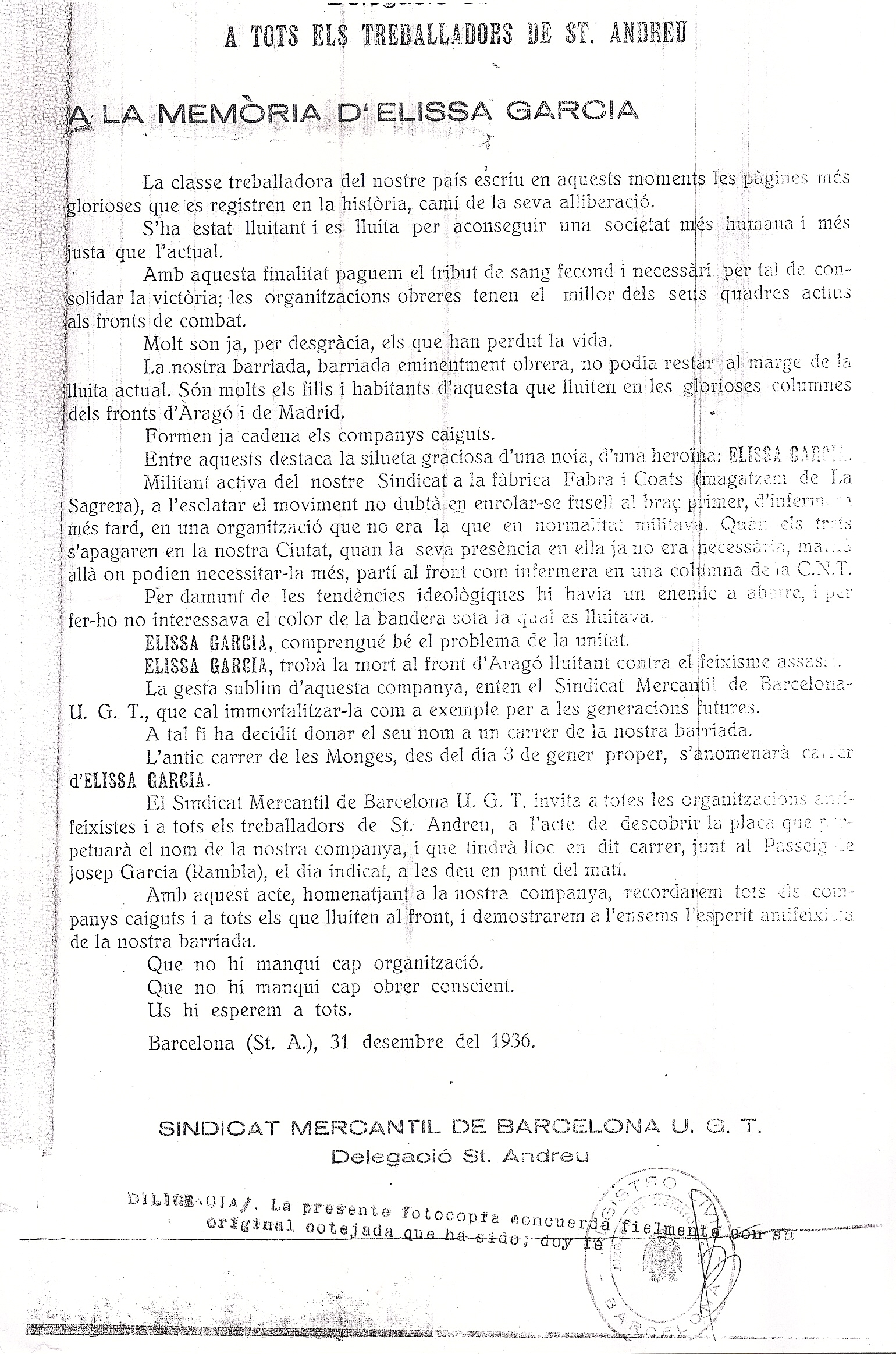
Note in memory of Elisa García Sáez, published by UGT in December 1936 following her death in combat.

During the winter of 1936, the Republican government tried to formally convert militias into units in their armed forces. Until this point, women had joined militias affiliated with various political parties and unions.

===== Tardienta sector =====
Starting in December, Concha Pérez Collado was part of a group of milicianas that fought in the Tardienta sector. The women were eventually moved off the front by the end of the year.

==== January 1937 ====
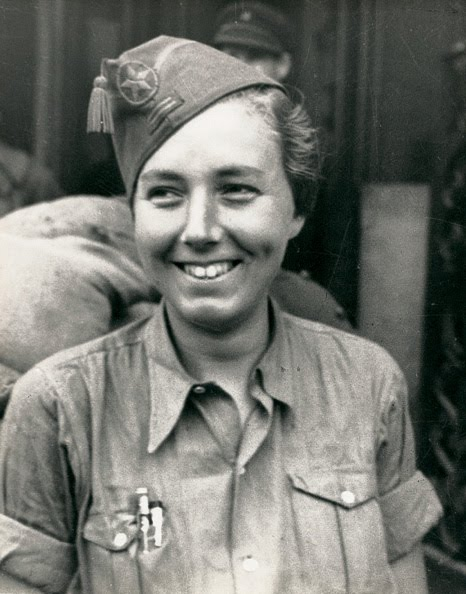
Fanny Schoonheyt in Barcelona, May 1937.

===== Battle of Jarama =====
In January 1937 at the Battle of Jarama, Republican forces were near the point of retreating until three Spanish milicianas inspired the men they were serving with to hold fast. The women, manning a machine gun post, refused to retreat.

==== March 1937 ====
===== Madrid Front =====
Salaria Kea, the only African American woman to serve in the International Brigades, joined the Abraham Lincoln Battalion in 1937. As a nurse in the American Medical Bureau, she was deployed along the Madrid front in March. where she was captured by Spanish Nationalist Army. Kea managed to escape six weeks later with assistance from International Brigade soldiers.

POUM milicianas in Madrid during the siege were at prohibited from taking up arms by the Communist organized La Pasionaria column. These women were instead required to cook and do laundry for men serving on the Madrid front.

==== May 1937 ====
===== Vizcaya Front =====
María Elisa García was killed in combat in the mountains of Múgica on 9 May 1937.

===== Barcelona Front =====
Concha Pérez Collado was ambushed in Barcelona and wounded while patrolling the area near Plaza de Catalunya. The metal fragment that was lodged in her leg would stay in her body for several years.

===== May Days =====
Clara Thalmann took part in the Barcelona May Days confrontation, serving with Amigos de Durruti, alongside Paul Thalmann, her future husband. While in Barcelona, she met George Orwell while serving on the barricades. A crackdown occurred as a consequence of the event, and Thalmann and her future husband went underground, but were later captured by Servicio de Información Militar (SIM) while trying to flee by boat from Barcelona. After several months in prison, the pair returned to Switzerland. Another woman who was POUM nurse Teresa Rebull. Her involvement led to punishment, which was part of the reason she subsequently fled Spain. Lois Orr was also involved in the Barcelona May Days.

==== June 1937 ====
===== Huesca Offensive =====
Women continued to die on the front while in combat. Margaret Zimbal was shot by a sniper in Huesca while attending to an injured comrade.

===== May Day Fallout =====
The fall out from the May Days resulted in a number of milicianas in Barcelona seeking to leave the city in June and the subsequent months after some were freed from prison.

Andrés Nin and the POUM executive were arrested on 16 June 1937 as part of the fallout of the May Day events. The following day, Lois Orr and a group she was with were arrested. With assistance from the United States Consul Mahlon Perkins, her group was released on 1 July. She then left the city two days later aboard a ship bound for France.

==== September 1937 ====
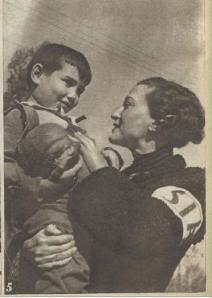
Antifascist International Solidarity (SIA) was founded in Spain in June 1937 by the National Confederation of Labor (CNT) with other libertarian organizations, the Iberian Anarchist Federation (FAI) and the Iberian Federation of Libertarian Youth (FIJL).

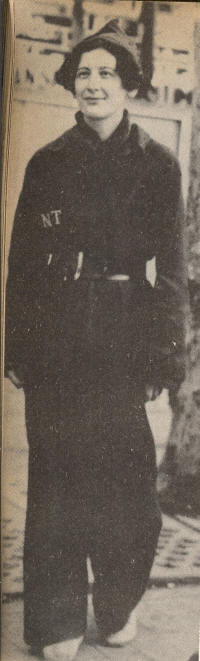
French miliciana Simone Weil during the Spanish Civil War.

===== Republican Army Peñarroya and Córdoba Attacks =====
Foreign observers covering the war often wrote about women's bravery on the front, including saying they took enemy fire better than many of the men they fought alongside. One example of such bravery happened in Cerro Muriano in September 1937, where Republican army forces from Jaén and Valencia fled the front while the small militia force from Alcoy, which included two women, withstood a Nationalist bombardment.

==== October 1937 ====
===== Northern Front =====
Argentina García was on the front in October 1937 in San Esteban de las Cruces. The communist's bravery in battle was recognized with a promotion to Captain in her Asturias Battalion.

==== July 1938 ====
===== Battle of the Ebro =====
Salaria Kea, serving as a nurse, was Abraham Lincoln Battalion during the Ebro Offensive.

=== Demobilization ===
There are conflicting accounts by historians as to when the decision was made to remove women from the front on the Republican side. One side dates the decision to late fall of 1936 as the date when Prime Minister Francisco Largo Caballero gave the order. Others date the order to March 1937. What is most likely is that various political and military leaders made their own decisions based on their own beliefs that led to different groups of female combatants gradually being withdrawn from the front. But whatever date ascribed, women were being encouraged to leave the front by September 1936.

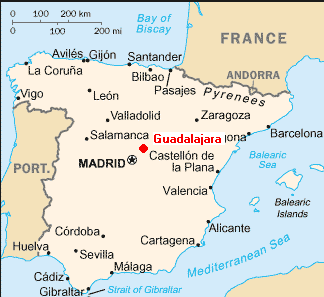
Location of Guadalajara, where women were told to leave the front in March 1937.

Women were told to leave the front in Guadalajara in March 1937. Following the battle, many were load into cars and taken to support positions further behind the lines. A few refused to leave, and their fate is uncertain though friends suspected most died in combat. Expelled soldiers included Leopoldine Kokes of the International Group of the Durruti Column. Some demobilized women left the front, and joined women's columns on the home front, in defense of cities like Madrid and Barcelona. When Juan Negrín became the head of the Republican armed forces in May 1937, women's time in combat ended as he continued efforts to regularize Republican forces into the Republican Army. Negrín also sent word out abroad that while men were still being actively recruited, organizations were banned from sending women fighters.

Feminists in PSUC and POUM responded by changing their messaging, either suggesting women should be deployed on the home front or that women had a different role to play than men during times of war.

The decision to remove milicianas from the front was one made largely by liberal male Republican leaders. Women on the front did not agree. They saw their removal as a backward step, a return to traditional roles that pre-dated the Second Republic. They viewed this decision as part of a larger symptom of problems for women in society, and did not want to return to the traditional gender roles from which they had used the war to escape. Neither milicianas themselves, nor the men they served with or other actors on the Republican side, launched a protest to their withdraw. The lack of support from male comrades was particularly upsetting for some women as it appeared to them as if they never bothered to try to understand their plight. Consequently, the milicianas just quietly faded away without public protest or awareness.

The removal of women from the front was a continuation of Second Republic policies designed to appeal to conservatives elements within it, who wanted to make the Republic more palatable by less overtly challenging traditional Spanish beliefs about topics such as the role of women. Removing women from the front was just part of a broader late Republican role back of women's rights to appease this base that had actually served to encourage Nationalist forces and ideas in the first place, with rationals like women did not know how to use weapons and women spread venereal disease.

=== Media depictions ===
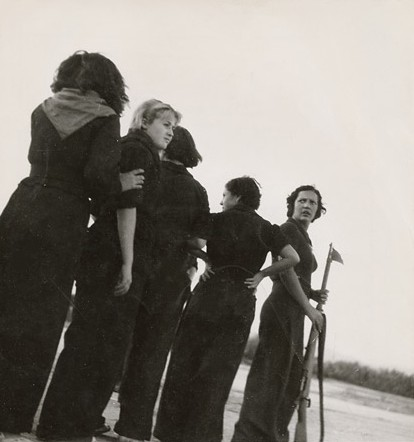
Republican militia women in training during the Spanish Civil War.

Republican propaganda about women fell into several broad categories including as a symbol of the struggle, as protective women like nurses, as victims, as representatives of the Republic, as protectors of Spain's rearguard, as carriers of venereal disease, and as combatants.

During the Spanish Civil War, the militia woman (Spanish: miliciana) served as an important figure for Republican forces in the period between July and December 1936.

Both foreign and domestic media printed images of these female fighters on Spain's front lines as breaking gender norms. Initially, they presented problems for some people in Spain, as the country had very traditional ideas about gender roles. While Republicans became more accepting of them, this started to change yet again by December 1936 when the Government of the Second Republic started using the slogan, "Men to the Front, Women to the Home Front." By March 1937, this attitude had spread to the front lines, where militia women, over their own objections, were withdrawn or placed into secondary roles.

Republican forces used the presence of milicianas as adventurous and sometimes frivolous in their own propaganda. Nationalist propaganda in contract often depicted the miliciana as a prostitute. To some degree, the image in Republican propaganda was one that many milicianas identified with and were complicit in sharing as they had absorbed cultural gender norms in their youth that they continued to perpetuate. At the same time, they often created and shared narratives that highlighted their chastity during the Civil War. When interviewed by the press, many women were offended by questions about their private lives. Rosario Sánchez Mora, La Dinamitera, reacted in anger when interviewed, saying that comparisons to prostitutes hurt her as these women were ready to die for their ideals and ready to die for those who shared in their leftist ideology. Independent Republican media often depicted milicianas not in combat, but in support roles. Many fighters were shown in photos while nursing injured in their battalions, or cooking and cleaning for them.

In contrast to the Republican miliciana, Nationalist propaganda held help the image of the mujer castiza. She was modest, pure, asexual, self-sacrificing and traditional, supporting the Spanish family through work at home, She was the anti-thesis of the Republican fighter in that she was far away from the front and would never be involved in combat.

Milicianas on the front often wrote about their experiences for publication in party supported media. One of the main topics they focused on was often inequality on the front, and the expectation that in addition to combat, they would also do support roles like tending to the injured, cooking and cleaning while male colleagues were afforded time to rest.

Following their removal from the front, milicianas and women in general stopped featuring in Republican propaganda. Visually, they returned to their lives before the war, where their primary role was behind the scenes at home. Communists and anarchists columns attracted the most women among all the political groups on the Republican front. Stories about POUM militants became more well known as they were more likely to have published their memories or had better contacts with international media.

In the end, milicianas featured in propaganda published by both sides during the Civil War often served as a symbol of a gendered cultural ideal. Their depictions were often for the male gaze on both sides of the propaganda war. The way there were often drawn as highly sexualized beings made it easy for those on both sides to dismiss them as prostitutes.

== Francoist Spain (1938 - 1973) ==
The end of the Civil War, and the victory of Francoist Spain, saw the return of traditional gender roles to Spain. This included the unacceptability of women serving in combat roles in the military. After the war, many milicianas faced difficulties. This included the general population being subjected to a propaganda war that ridiculed their involvement in the conflict. At the same time, the new government sought them out to put them in prison or torture them. Many fighters were also illiterate, and found this to be restrict later activities. This was coupled with restrictions placed on some when in exile in France that limited their opportunities. For those who remained politically active, they had to deal with open sexism in the Communist Party and in anarchist circles.

Some women's veterans of the war never retired. They instead continued active violence against the state as part of communist and anarchist cells, using terrorism like tactics. This included bombing Guardia Civil positions, robbing banks and attacking offices of Falange. Women involved with this resistance effort included Victòria Pujolar, Adelaida Abarca Izquierdo and Angelita Ramis. These women, and women like them, served as go betweens for exiled leaders in France and those on the ground in Spain. They worked with Communist Party leaders to plan attacks.

== Ignored and erased ==
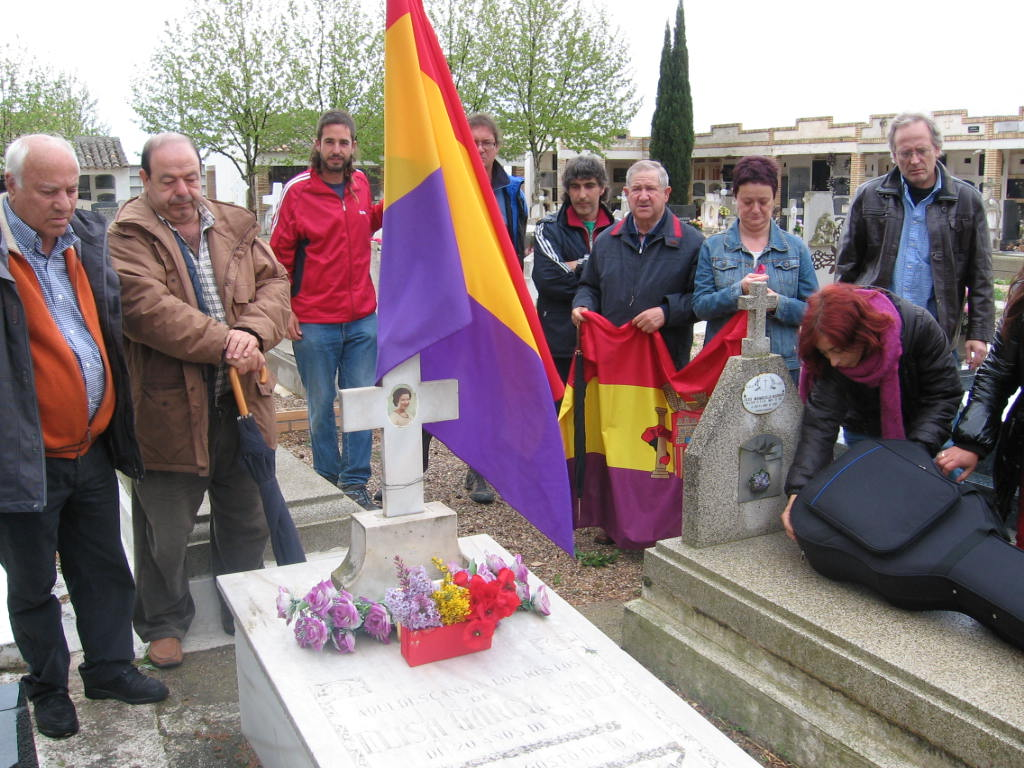
Homage on 14 April 2012 in honor of Aragón miliciana Elisa García Sáez.

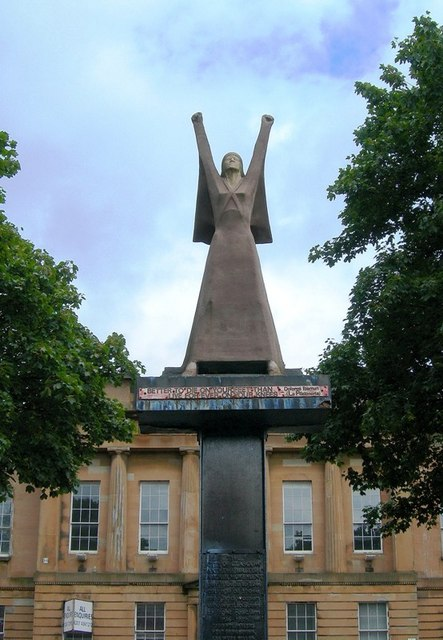
A labor union monument in Glasgow with Dolores Ibárruri 's quote, "It is better to die on your feet than live on your knees. ¡No pasarán!" on it.

The valuable contributions by Spanish women fighting on the Republican side have been under reported, and women's own stories have frequently been ignored. One of the major reasons for this was the sexism that existed at the time: Women and the problems of women were just not considered important, especially by Francoist victors. When women's involvement in the Civil War was discussed, it was treated as a bunch of stories not relative to the overarching narratives of the war. At the same time, because Nationalist forces won the war, they wrote the history that followed, As they represented a return to traditional gender norms, they had even less reason than Republican forces to discuss the importance of women's involvement on the losing side of the war.

Francoist propaganda actively targeted milicianas, ridiculing their involvement in the war. Many milicianas were imprisoned or tortured, even decades after the war ended. As a result, many of the women who fought during the war were forced to remain silent. The first time Spain's milicianas were discussed openly was in 1989 at a conference about the Civil War in Salamanca.

Another reason the role of Spanish women on the Republican side in the Civil War has been ignored is there is a lack of primary sources. This was a result oftentimes of either fleeing government forces destroying documents or women themselves destroying documents in order to protest themselves. Concealing their own involvement in the war in many cases assisted them in saving their own lives. In other cases, battles themselves resulted in the destruction of valuable documents that discussed women's involvement on the front.
