= UE Sant Andreu =

- Full name: Unió Esportiva Sant Andreu
- Nicknames: Quadribarrats; Grocs
- Founded: 21 January 1909; 117 years ago
- Stadium: Narcís Sala
- Capacity: 6,563
- Owner: Taica Corporation
- President: Manuel Camino
- Head coach: Javi Rey
- League: Primera Federación – Group 2
- 2025–26: Segunda Federación – Group 3, 1st of 18 (champions)
- Website: www.uesantandreu.cat
Home colours	Away colours	Third colours

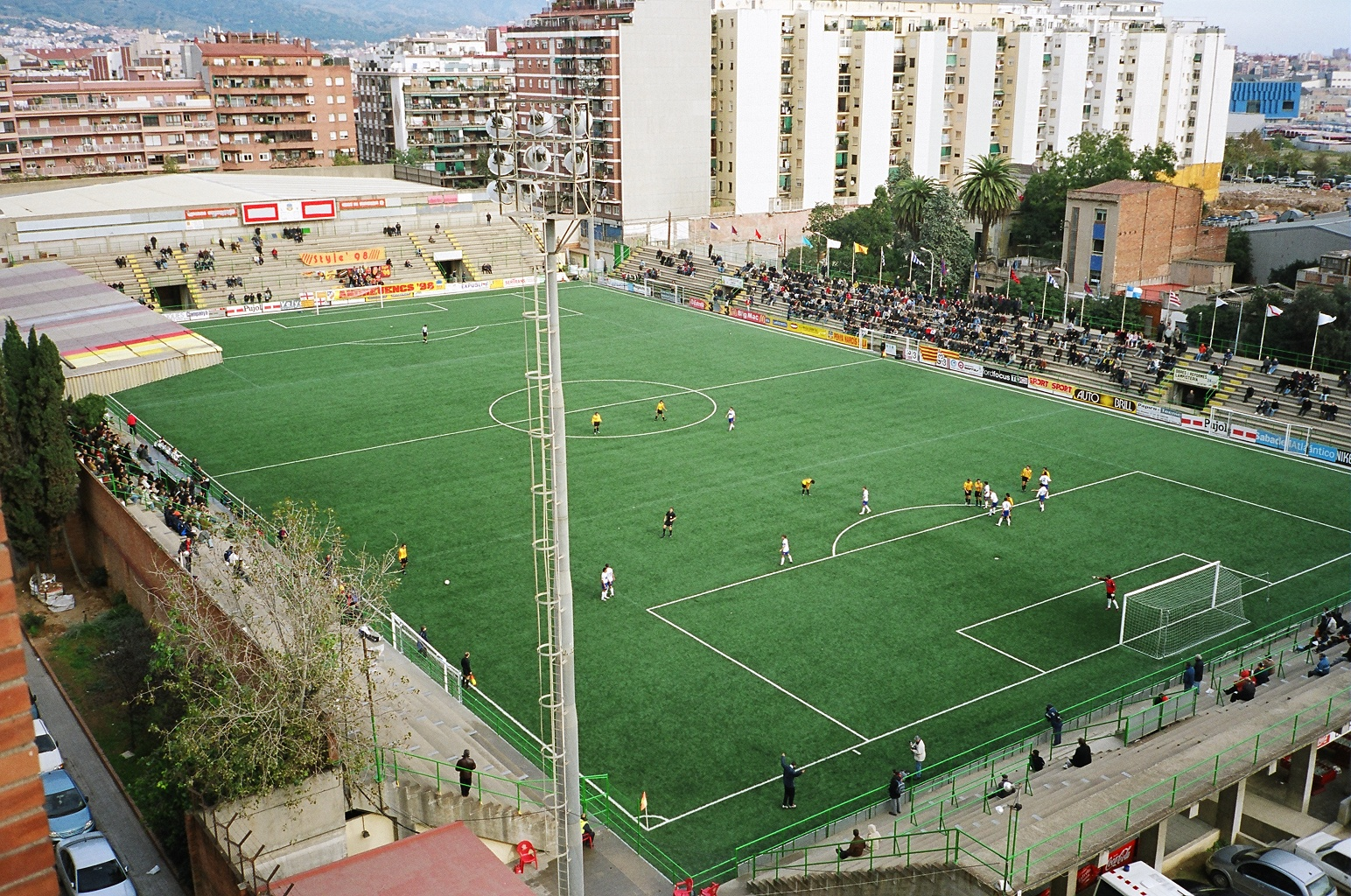
Municipal Narcís Sala, Sant Andreu's grounds

Unió Esportiva Sant Andreu (Catalan pronunciation: [uniˈo əspuɾˈtiβə ˈsant ənˈdɾew]) is a Catalan football club based in the district of Sant Andreu in Barcelona, Catalonia. Founded in 1909, it plays in Primera Federación – Group 2, holding home matches at Camp Municipal Narcís Sala, with an all-seated capacity of 6,563.

== Supporters and culture ==
=== Supporters' groups ===
The principal supporters' group of UE Sant Andreu is the Desperdicis, an organised fan collective with an ideological identity rooted in anti-fascism, anti-racism, Catalanism, and working-class solidarity. The group is known for large and politically expressive tifo displays at the Narcís Sala stadium, particularly during derby matches against CE Europa. Supporters and academic observers have compared the Desperdicis to similar politically engaged fan groups elsewhere in Spain, including the Bukaneros of Rayo Vallecano and the Herri Norte Taldea of Athletic Bilbao. Research conducted at the Universitat de Barcelona between November 2024 and April 2025 found that the Desperdicis have been the primary driver of the club's sociopolitical identity, with the organised fan base shaping the club's public image and values over successive changes of ownership. Supporters themselves have described the growth of the club's social membership as the product of fan-led effort rather than institutional direction.

=== Club membership ===
UE Sant Andreu experienced a significant expansion of its supporter base during the 2020s. Club membership stood at approximately 670 in 2020 and grew to 4,857 by March 2025, representing a 625% increase over five years. In October 2022, the club closed its season ticket window with 1,134 members; by the same date in 2023, this figure had risen to 3,110. The club reported over 5,000 fee-paying members by 2025. Club spokesman Gerard Álvarez attributed this growth to the values the club embodies and to the tireless efforts of supporters and club officials, describing Sant Andreu as "an anti-fascist, anti-racist, feminist, Catalanist, working class, and human rights-defending club".

=== Political and social identity ===
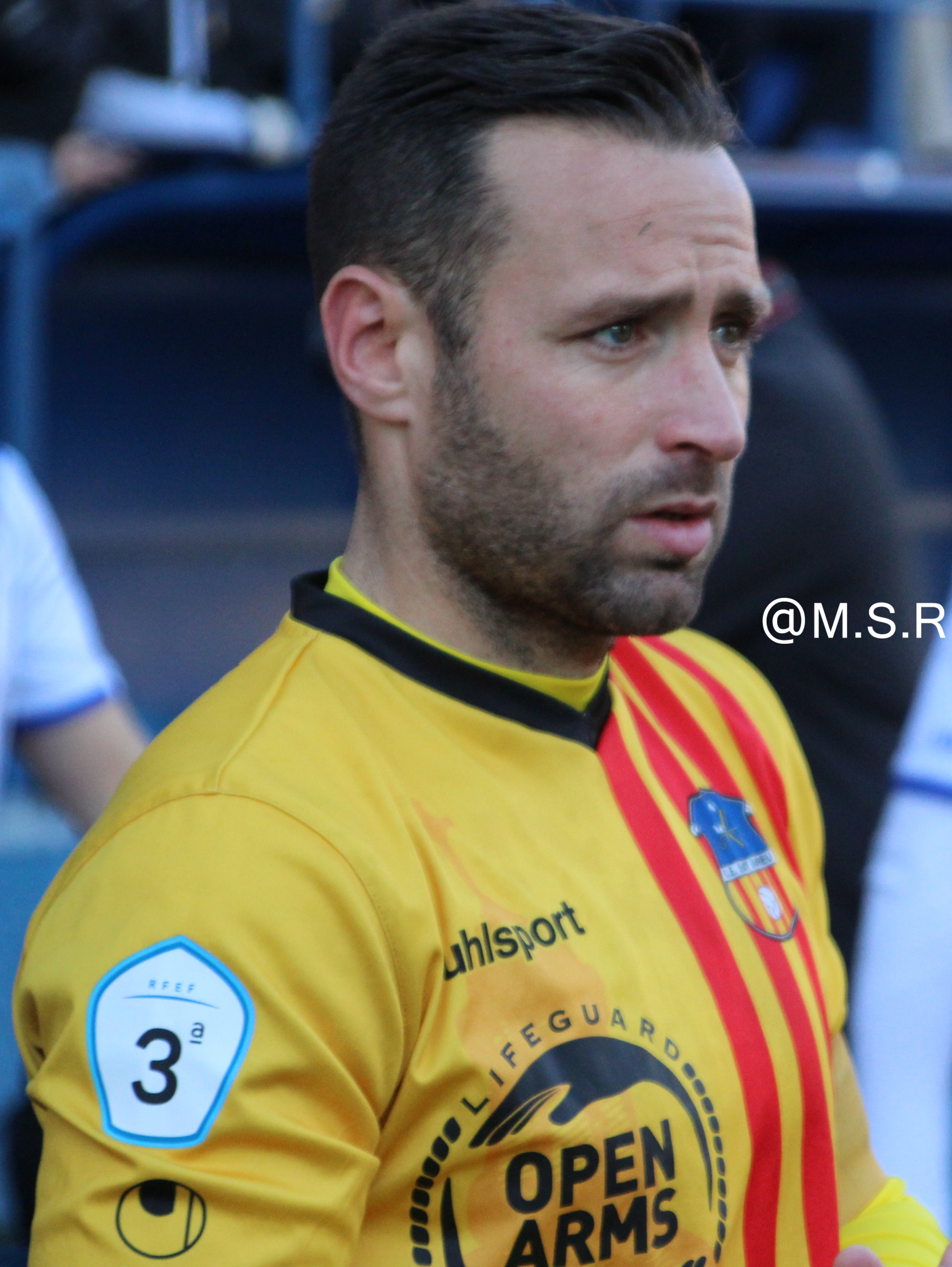
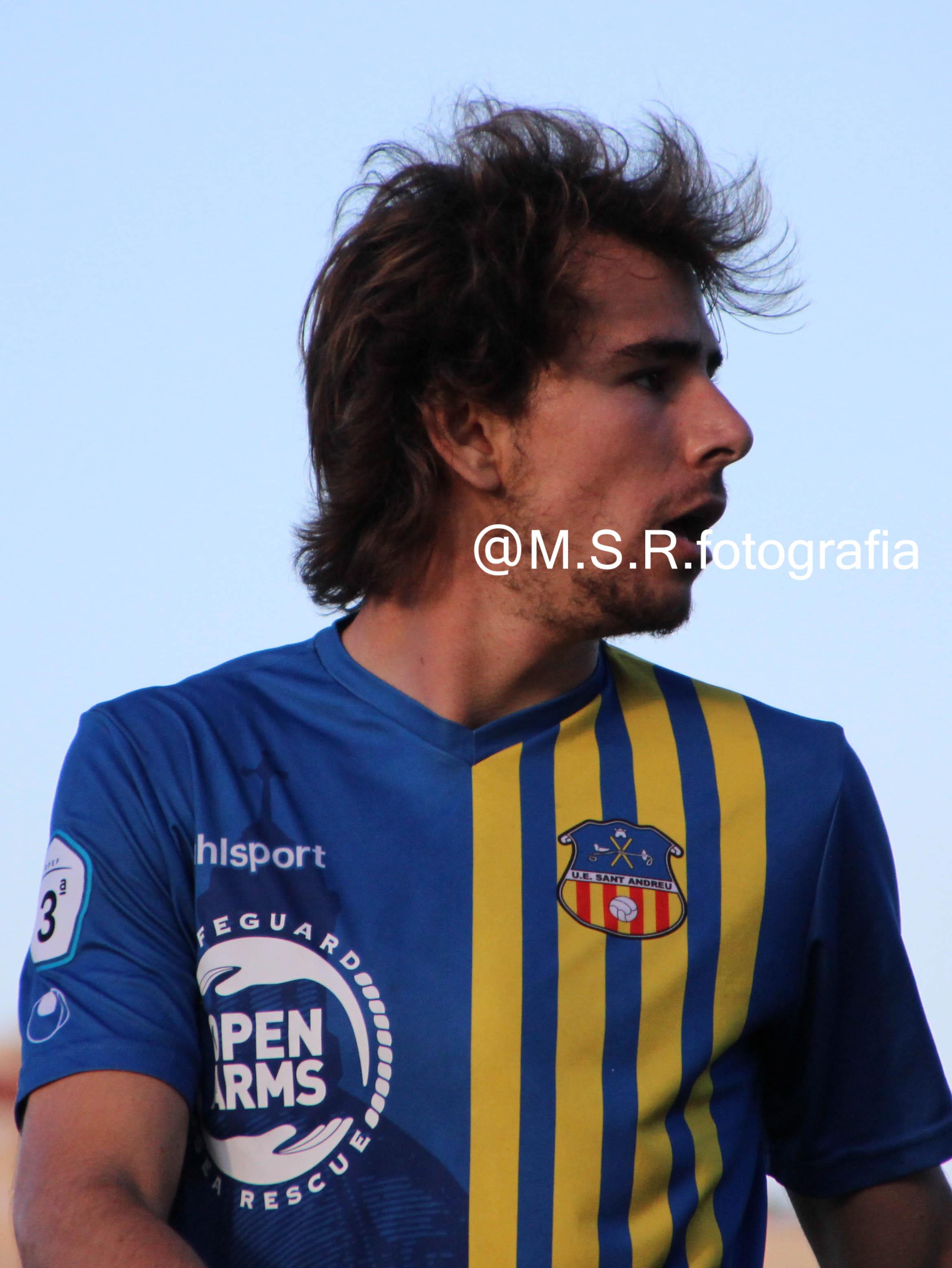
UE Sant Andreu kits from 2019/2020 featuring the Proactiva Open Arms collaboration

UE Sant Andreu has cultivated a pronounced sociopolitical identity. When drawn against Atlético Madrid in the 2018 Copa del Rey, the club chose to display the logo of Proactiva Open Arms (an NGO providing maritime rescue services to migrants attempting to reach Europe) on its shirts rather than commercial sponsorship. The club has continued to wear the Open Arms logo and donates portions of replica jersey sales to the organisation.

Sant Andreu was the first Spanish football club to publicly condemn the conduct of Luis Rubiales at the 2023 FIFA Women's World Cup final, in which the then-president of the Royal Spanish Football Federation kissed player Jenni Hermoso without her consent during the medal ceremony. The club has also supported LGBTQ+ rights and feminist causes, and has cooperated with various social entities within its territory. Academic research found that the club's sociopolitical positioning emerged through a bottom-up process driven by the organised fan base, a dynamic that contrasts with CE Europa, where ideological identity was initiated by club management in a top-down process. This sociopolitical profile has been maintained across successive ownership changes, including the acquisition of the club by Japanese investor Taito Suzuki in November 2024. Supporters have also established a legal support collective, Ajuda Quadribarrada, operating under the Federació de Penyes, to assist fans facing legal difficulties arising from alleged politically motivated police repression during away fixtures outside Catalonia.

The group's visual culture frequently incorporates historical and political themes. In 2024, supporters displayed a tifo commemorating three women associated with the Republican cause during the Spanish Civil War, including Elisa García Sáez, a native of Sant Andreu who died fighting nationalist forces in 1936. The club has also aligned itself with campaigns supporting refugees and encouraging social inclusion within its local community, including initiatives aimed at engaging elderly residents in club activities. Club representatives have described affiliation with Sant Andreu as implying a commitment extending beyond football to community engagement and social values.

=== Catalan language and culture ===
Catalan language and culture are central to the club's identity. All official social media content is published exclusively in Catalan, and the club's website, titled "L'orgull del poble des de 1909" ("Pride of the people since 1909"), is maintained in Catalan only.

The club has used its platform on X to advocate for language rights. Supporters and players have also been reported to assist newly arrived immigrants in learning Catalan as part of the club's broader community outreach. The club jersey has historically featured the quatre barres (four bars) of the Catalan flag, earning the team and its supporters the nickname "quadribarrats". This design was suppressed during the Francoist dictatorship, when the club was required to change its colours, but was subsequently restored and has since become a defining symbol of Catalan identity at the club. In a 2013 public statement, then-president Manuel Camino contested the use of similar colours by FC Barcelona, noting that Sant Andreu had worn the quatribarrada design since its foundation in 1909. It has been traditional to play "Els Segadors", the Catalan national anthem, before derby kick-offs against CE Europa. This practice was interrupted after 2017, amid political tensions following the independence referendum, but was revived in 2025 following supporters' demands. Fans also sing "El Virolai", a hymn dedicated to Our Lady of Montserrat, and the official club anthem "Flames i ginesta", which celebrates the Catalan colours. The anthem was reinterpreted in 2025 by Ginestà, a pop group from Sant Andreu de Palomar with close ties to the club.

=== Attendance ===
Matchday at the Narcís Sala is characterised by a strong community atmosphere. Bars in the Sant Andreu de Palomar neighbourhood typically begin filling with supporters from 11am on matchdays, contributing to what observers have described as a "village-like" environment distinct from central Barcelona. The stadium itself is closely integrated into the surrounding residential area, with adjacent buildings overlooking the pitch. Attendances have consistently exceeded 2,000 since April 2023, regularly reaching between 3,000 and 4,000. Derby matches against CE Europa regularly sell out the ground, which has a capacity of 6,563. In March 2025, over 6,500 supporters attended the league fixture between the two sides. The club has maintained an inclusive ticketing policy, keeping prices low despite successive promotions. Álvarez stated in 2023: "We have put democratic prices on tickets and season tickets, and we look after them with travel".

Observers have noted the close physical and emotional relationship between players and supporters, facilitated by the stadium's compact design and the proximity of fans to the pitch. The Narcís Sala is also the base of several other social entities and community groups, and supporters have described the stadium as a meeting point for organisations sharing the club's values.

=== Resistance to commercialisation ===
A significant element of the club's supporter culture is its rejection of what some Spanish and Italian fan movements have termed "fútbol negocio" (football business), encompassing rising ticket prices that disadvantage working-class and younger fans, club debt, the control of broadcasting rights by private bodies, commercially driven fixture scheduling, and the privatisation of clubs through sociedades anónimas or corporate acquisitions. Supporters and academic observers have noted that growing disaffection with the cost and corporate identity of elite football has driven many fans towards clubs such as Sant Andreu.

This positioning has contributed to the club's reputation as a "cult" institution within Spanish football, attracting interest from supporters disillusioned with elite-level commercialisation while also generating increased attention from tourists and groundhoppers. Club officials have acknowledged tensions between growth and maintaining the club's traditional identity as it seeks promotion to higher divisions.

Research conducted at the Universitat de Barcelona found that supporters regard the Narcís Sala as a space of symbolic resistance against the homogenising logic of both elite football and the broader commercialisation of Barcelona as a city. Supporters frequently contrasted the experience of watching Sant Andreu with that of attending FC Barcelona matches, describing the latter as having become economically inaccessible and alienated from its local fanbase. The club's sponsorship model has been designed to balance multinational partners with small local businesses, reflecting this community-first philosophy. As a Sociedad Anónima Deportiva, the club is privately owned, yet the organised fan base has exercised significant influence over its direction, constituting what scholars have identified as a moral economy operating from the terraces (in E. P. Thompson's sense of the term), placing limits on the capacity of ownership to act contrary to the values associated with the club.

=== Derby rivalry with CE Europa ===
The rivalry between UE Sant Andreu and CE Europa of the Gràcia neighbourhood is frequently characterised as the most authentic football derby in Barcelona. Both clubs share a progressive, Catalanist ideology and represent neighbourhoods that were independent municipalities prior to their annexation by Barcelona in 1897. Despite sharing broadly similar values, the two clubs were historically on amicable terms. As late as 1994, Europa hosted a home match at the Narcís Sala, and during the 1920s, the clubs organised fundraising fixtures to assist one another. The modern form of the rivalry is generally dated to 11 November 2007, when a provocative banner displayed in the Narcís Sala significantly heightened tensions between the two sets of supporters, attracting press coverage and prompting a public response from then-president Joan Gaspart. Historians of both neighbourhoods have identified internet forums of the early 2000s as the embryonic space in which rivalry rhetoric developed, before manifesting in the stands. Both clubs' animation groups (the Desperdicis for Sant Andreu and the Eskapulats for Europa) are known for elaborate and politically expressive tifo displays during derby fixtures. Despite their on-pitch rivalry, the two groups collaborate within the Gran Companyia Catalana, an animation collective supporting the Catalan national football team.

== Club name ==
- Club de Futbol Andreuenc (1909–25)
- L'Avenç del Sport (1911–25)
- Unió Esportiva Sant Andreu (1925–40)
- Club Deportivo San Andrés (1940–79)
- Unión Deportiva San Andrés (1979–80)
- Unió Esportiva Sant Andreu (1980–current)

== Season to season ==
Season	Tier	Division	Place	Copa del Rey
1939–40	5	1ª Reg. B	1st	
1940–41	3	3ª	2nd	
1941–42	3	1ª Reg. A	3rd	
1942–43	4	1ª Reg. B	2nd	
1943–44	4	1ª Reg. A	5th	
1944–45	4	1ª Reg. A	10th	
1945–46	4	1ª Reg. A	7th	
1946–47	4	1ª Reg. A	1st	
1947–48	3	3ª	2nd	First round
1948–49	3	3ª	4th	First round
1949–50	3	3ª	1st	
1950–51	2	2ª	4th	
1951–52	2	2ª	12th	
1952–53	2	2ª	8th	First round
1953–54	3	3ª	3rd	
1954–55	3	3ª	3rd	
1955–56	3	3ª	8th	
1956–57	3	3ª	10th	
1957–58	3	3ª	1st	
1958–59	3	3ª	13th	

Season	Tier	Division	Place	Copa del Rey
1959–60	3	3ª	12th	
1960–61	3	3ª	10th	
1961–62	3	3ª	5th	
1962–63	3	3ª	5th	
1963–64	3	3ª	5th	
1964–65	3	3ª	11th	
1965–66	3	3ª	5th	
1966–67	3	3ª	8th	
1967–68	3	3ª	5th	
1968–69	3	3ª	1st	
1969–70	2	2ª	8th	Fourth round
1970–71	2	2ª	7th	Quarterfinals
1971–72	2	2ª	10th	Round of 16
1972–73	2	2ª	6th	Fourth round
1973–74	2	2ª	8th	Round of 16
1974–75	2	2ª	7th	Round of 16
1975–76	2	2ª	14th	Fourth round
1976–77	2	2ª	19th	First round
1977–78	3	2ª B	11th	Second round
1978–79	3	2ª B	8th	Second round

Season	Tier	Division	Place	Copa del Rey
1979–80	3	2ª B	17th	First round
1980–81	4	3ª	9th	
1981–82	4	3ª	9th	
1982–83	4	3ª	4th	
1983–84	4	3ª	4th	First round
1984–85	4	3ª	1st	First round
1985–86	4	3ª	3rd	Second round
1986–87	4	3ª	20th	First round
1987–88	4	3ª	2nd	
1988–89	4	3ª	3rd	
1989–90	4	3ª	1st	
1990–91	3	2ª B	13th	Fourth round
1991–92	3	2ª B	1st	Third round
1992–93	3	2ª B	2nd	Third round
1993–94	3	2ª B	7th	First round
1994–95	3	2ª B	15th	First round
1995–96	3	2ª B	12th	
1996–97	3	2ª B	19th	
1997–98	4	3ª	15th	
1998–99	4	3ª	19th	

Season	Tier	Division	Place	Copa del Rey
1999–2000	5	1ª Cat.	1st	
2000–01	4	3ª	13th	
2001–02	4	3ª	4th	
2002–03	4	3ª	3rd	
2003–04	4	3ª	8th	
2004–05	4	3ª	3rd	
2005–06	3	2ª B	11th	
2006–07	3	2ª B	17th	First round
2007–08	4	3ª	2nd	
2008–09	3	2ª B	3rd	Second round
2009–10	3	2ª B	1st	Third round
2010–11	3	2ª B	7th	Third round
2011–12	3	2ª B	10th	Second round
2012–13	3	2ª B	7th	
2013–14	3	2ª B	15th	Round of 32
2014–15	3	2ª B	18th	
2015–16	4	3ª	7th	
2016–17	4	3ª	5th	
2017–18	4	3ª	2nd	
2018–19	4	3ª	5th	Round of 32

Season	Tier	Division	Place	Copa del Rey
2019–20	4	3ª	4th	
2020–21	4	3ª	4th / 1st	
2021–22	5	3ª RFEF	5th	
2022–23	5	3ª Fed.	2nd	
2023–24	4	2ª Fed.	4th	
2024–25	4	2ª Fed.	3rd	Second round
2025–26	4	2ª Fed.	1st	Second round
2026–27	3	1ª Fed.		TBD

- 11 seasons in Segunda División
- 1 season in Primera Federación
- 19 seasons in Segunda División B
- 3 seasons in Segunda Federación
- 44 seasons in Tercera División
- 2 seasons in Tercera Federación/Tercera División RFEF

== Current squad ==
As of 2 September 2026

Note: Flags indicate national team as defined under FIFA eligibility rules; some limited exceptions apply. Players may hold more than one non-FIFA nationality.

No.	Pos.	Nation	Player
1	GK	ESP	Ramón Juan
2	DF	ESP	Félix Garreta
3	DF	ESP	Andreu Hernández
4	DF	ESP	Carlos Blanco
5	DF	ESP	Lucas Viña
6	MF	ESP	Óscar Carrasco
7	MF	ESP	Pau Darbra
8	MF	ESP	Albertito
9	FW	ESP	Jaume Tovar
10	FW	ESP	Alexis García
11	FW	ESP	Álex Bermejo
12	MF	ESP	Dani Torices
13	GK	ESP	Iñaki Álvarez

No.	Pos.	Nation	Player
14	MF	ESP	Marc Delgado
15	DF	ESP	Jordi Méndez
16	MF	ESP	Pablo Agudín (on loan from Oviedo)
17	DF	ESP	Joan Anaya
18	FW	ESP	Sergi Armero
19	FW	ESP	Carles Garrido (on loan from Girona)
20	DF	ESP	Javi Gómez
21	DF	ESP	Nil Jiménez
22	FW	ESP	Sergi Serrano
23	DF	ESP	Antonio Montoro
24	MF	JPN	Mirei Sugiura (on loan from Shonan Bellmare)
25	FW	PUR	Jeremy de León
—	MF	ESP	Noel Carbonell

=== Youth team ===
Note: Flags indicate national team as defined under FIFA eligibility rules; some limited exceptions apply. Players may hold more than one non-FIFA nationality.

No.	Pos.	Nation	Player
27	MF	JPN	Ryoma Hosoyamada

=== Out on loan ===
As of 9 July 2026

Note: Flags indicate national team as defined under FIFA eligibility rules; some limited exceptions apply. Players may hold more than one non-FIFA nationality.

No.	Pos.	Nation	Player
—	DF	ESP	Pablo Santiago (at Olot until 30 June 2027)

== Honours ==
- Segunda División B: 1991–92, 2009-10
- Segunda Federación: 2025-26
- Tercera División: 1949–50, 1957–58, 1968–69, 1984–85, 1989–90
- Copa Catalunya: 2008–09, 2018–19
- Copa Federación: 2012–13
- Catalan Second Division: 1919–20, 1920–21, 1939–40
- Catalan Historical Teams Tournament: 2005, 2007, 2014, 2021, 2023, 2024

== Former players ==
Note: this list includes players that have appeared in at least 100 league games and/or have reached international status, along with the position they played at.

- (Spain) Ramón Calderé (Midfielder)
- (Spain) Manuel Lanzarote (Midfielder)
- (Spain) Luso (Midfielder)
- (Spain) José Miguel Morales (Goalkeeper)
- (Andorra) Ildefons Lima (Defender)

Category:UE Sant Andreu footballers

== Former coaches ==
- (Spain) Domènec Balmanya
- (Spain) César Rodríguez
- (Czechoslovakia) Jiří Sobotka
- (Spain) Xavi Molist
- (Spain) Patxi Salinas

== Bibliography ==
- Araguz i Boguña, Xavier; Becerra i Fortes, Joan Esteve; Domingo i Villarreal, Àngel; Martínez i Calatrava, Vicenç; Petit i Gil, Jordi; Quintana Ramírez, Eduardo; Terrè i Ponsà, Quim (2009). Unió Esportiva Sant Andreu 1909–2009 (in Catalan). Barcelona: Municipality of Barcelona; Unió Esportiva Sant Andreu; Institut Barcelona Esports. ISBN 978-84-9850-175-9. DL: B-30.935.2009.
- Becerra i Fortes, Joan Esteve; Petit i Gil, Jordi; Quintana Ramírez, Eduardo (2025). Unió Esportiva Sant Andreu (2009-2025) (in Catalan). Barcelona: Tarannà Edicions. ISBN 978-84-09-71388-2. DL: B 7787-2025.
