= Concha Pérez Collado =

Spanish trade unionist (1915–2014)

- Born: 17 October 1915; Les Corts, Barcelona, Catalonia, Spain
- Died: 17 April 2014 (aged 98); Barcelona, Catalonia, Spain
- Citizenship: Spain
- Era: Spanish Civil War
- Movement: Spanish republicanism Anarchism

Concha Pérez Collado (17 October 1915 Barcelona – 17 April 2014 Barcelona) was a Spanish anarchist involved with the CNT, and later the CGT. Involved with anarchist activities by the age of 17, she was part of an armed group ready to take on nationalist forces when the Spanish Civil War started in July 1936. She saw action in Barcelona and Aragon, before eventually moving to a French refugee camp where she gave birth to her only son.

Pérez Collado returned to France around 1942, where she lost and then regained custody of her son. Pérez Collado also reconnected with Maurici Palau, and the couple opened a jewelry and underwear shop which hosted anarchist meetings. Following the death of Francisco Franco, she became more openly involved in local organizing events and continued her anarchist activities. Pérez Collado died on 17 April 2014, in Barcelona, one of the last of her generation of female Civil War fighters to die.

== Youth ==
Pérez Collado was born on 17 October 1915 in Les Cortes, Barcelona. Her father, Juan Pérez Güell, had six children by two different women, with Pérez being his third. Her mother died as a result of tuberculosis when she was a 2-year-old. An anarchist, Pérez Güell spent time in prison as a result of his political beliefs. As a child, Pérez Collado was unable to attend school. When she was in her early teens, she started working in a graphic arts workshop. By the age of 16 she had left this job, and was involved with Ateneo Libertario Faro and Ateneo Agrupación Humanidad.

Pérez Collado was an anarchist. Pérez Collado joined Federación Anarquista Ibérica (FAI) in 1932. The following year, she was at a protest in front of a factory when she was arrested along with a companion for carrying a concealed weapon. Later, after being released from prison, she worked in carpentry. She kept this job until the outbreak of the Civil War.

== Civil War ==
When the Civil War started in July 1936, Pérez Collado already had access to weapons and was ready to head to the front. Part of an anarchist group that were preparing for what they saw as an inevitable military uprising, she trained with weapons in anticipation of an upcoming conflict.

In the early days of the war, Pérez Collado was part of Los Aguiluchos Column, a group of 100 armed soldiers from her Barcelona neighborhood. Only seven of them were women. Shortly after the start of the Civil War, Pérez Collado was part of a group that attacked the Model Prison with the goal of freeing political prisoners. Later, she was part of a group that took control of a convent. She also assisted in creating barricades in her Barcelona neighborhood. Along with other anarchists, she rode in the back of a pickup truck covered by a mattress and with four guns between them. They went to the Pedralbes Barracks, engaged in fighting there and managed to gain a small cache of weapons. Following this, her group went to Caspe on the Aragon front. Once in Caspe, she joined the Ortíz Column, going with her new unit to Azaida. Her unit stayed in Azaida until they mobilized for the attack on Belchite on 24 August 1936. She remained on the Aragon front for another four months, after which she departed for the Huesca. Starting in December, she was part of a group of militia women (Spanish: milicianas) that fought in the Tardienta sector. The women were eventually moved off the front by the end of the year, and she returned to Barcelona to work in a munitions factory.

Back in Barcelona in May 1937, Pérez Collado was ambushed and wounded while patrolling the area near Plaza de Catalunya. The metal fragment that was lodged in her leg would stay in her body for several years. She left for the border in December 1938 when Barcelona fell. She found herself in the Argelès refugee camp, where she subsequently volunteered as a nurse. While there, she met socialist Madrid doctor Isidoro Alonso and became involved with him. The two would become parents to Pérez Collado's only child, a son who was born in Marseilles.

== Post Civil War life ==
In September 1942, Pérez Collado returned to Barcelona only to lose custody of her son because the state determined she could not adequately care for him. Finding work as a domestic for a Jewish family, they went on to assist her in regaining custody of him by demonstrating she had enough money to raise him.

While in Barcelona, Pérez Collado also reconnected with Maurici Palau. A former lover, he had been recently released from a four-year prison stint. The couple then started a jewelry and undergarment shop at the Mercado de Sant Antoni. The shop also doubled as a meeting place for anarchists. During this time, she continued being a CNT militant. After the Civil War, she came much more active in the CGT. Following Franco's death in 1973, she became involved in her local neighborhood associations.

From 1982 to 1984, Pérez Collado participated in a series of interviews with Nick Rider about anarchism in Spain during the 1930s. Mujeres del 36 was created in 1997, with Pérez Collado one of its founders.

Pérez Collado died on 17 April 2014 in Barcelona. She was one of the last surviving Spanish militia women from the Civil War.

== Legacy ==
Members of the collective setting up a library at the local squatted social centre l'Entrebanc soon after Pérez Collado had died, decided to call the project Social Library Conxa Pérez in tribute to her life.

== See also ==
- Women in the Confederación Nacional del Trabajo
- Women in the Federación Anarquista Ibérica
