= Batet =

Batet is a surname. Notable people with the surname include:

- Domènec Batet (1872–1937), Spanish military personnel
- Meritxell Batet (born 1973), Spanish jurist and politician
- Pepita Laguarda Batet (1919–1936), Catalan militant anarchist
