= Lina Ódena =

Spanish communist and miliciana (1911–1936)

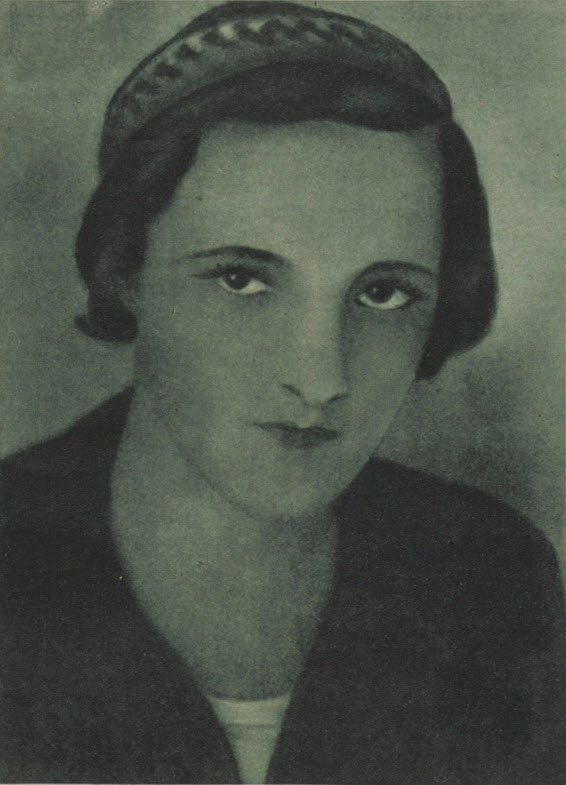
- Ódena in 1937
- Born: 22 January 1911; Passatge Pellicer, Barcelona, Spain
- Died: 14 September 1936 (aged 25); Granada, Spain
- Cause of death: suicide
- Education: International Lenin School
- Years active: 1931–1936
- Employer: Workers World
- Organization(s): Communist International; Association of Anti-Fascist Women; World Committee of Women Against War and Fascism
- Political party: Communist Party of Spain; Communist Youth of Catalonia

Paulina Ódena García (22 January 1911 – 14 September 1936), known as Lina Ódena, was a Spanish anti-fascist, communist, and miliciana. She participated in the Revolution of 1934 and was a combatant for the Republican faction during the Spanish Civil War (1936–1939).

== Early life ==
Ódena was born on 22 January 1911 in Passatge Pellicer in Barcelona, Spain. Her parents, José and María Dolores, ran a tailors shop and she worked as an apprentice seamstress for her parents.

In May 1931, Ódena joined the Communist Party of Spain (Spanish: Partido Comunista de España, PCE) and was assigned to work for the Communist Youth of Catalonia (Catalan: Joventut Comunista de Catalunya, JCC).

In August 1931, Ódena was sent by the Communist International (Comintern) to attend the International Lenin School in Moscow, Soviet Union for a year, with four other activists. At the International Lenin School, she met Spanish communists Jesús Hernández, Enrique Lister Forján and Juan Guilloto León.

After returning to Spain, she served on the editorial board of the communist newspaper Workers World (Spanish: Mundo Obrero). She was a member of the Association of Anti-Fascist Women (Spanish: Asociación de Mujeres Antifascistas, AMA) and participated in the Revolution of 1934.

In 1935, Ódena was a member of the Spanish delegation that attended the 4th Congress of the Communist Youth International (IJC) in Copenhagen, Denmark. In February 1936, Ódena was commissioned by the PCE to work as Dolores Ibarruri's assistant in the campaign for the 1936 Spanish general election. She travelled with Ibarruri to rallies in the Asturias, Andalusia and Madrid.

== Spanish Civil War ==
During the Spanish Civil War, Ódena was a leader of the anti-fascist resistance and fought on the front lines against Nationalist faction soldiers at Almería, Andalusia. She then established a headquarters in Guadix, Granada and organised a column for the capture of Granada as commandant. She made trips to Madrid and Barcelona with Antonio Pretel Fernández [es] to gather weapons for the cause and was appointed as the Spanish national secretary of the World Committee of Women Against War and Fascism (French: Comité mondial des femmes contre la guerre et le fascisme, CMF) [fr].

On 14 September 1936, Ódena and her driver took a wrong turn while travelling to Deifontes and were met by members of the fascist Falangist group Falange Española at a checkpoint on the Jaen Highway. She shot herself in the temple with her pistol rather than be captured, and died by suicide. Ódena was aged 25 when she died. Her car was seized and was taken to the San Jerónimo barracks, the driver was arrested and her body was taken to Granada. A military judge ordered that she be buried in the municipal cemetery of Granada.

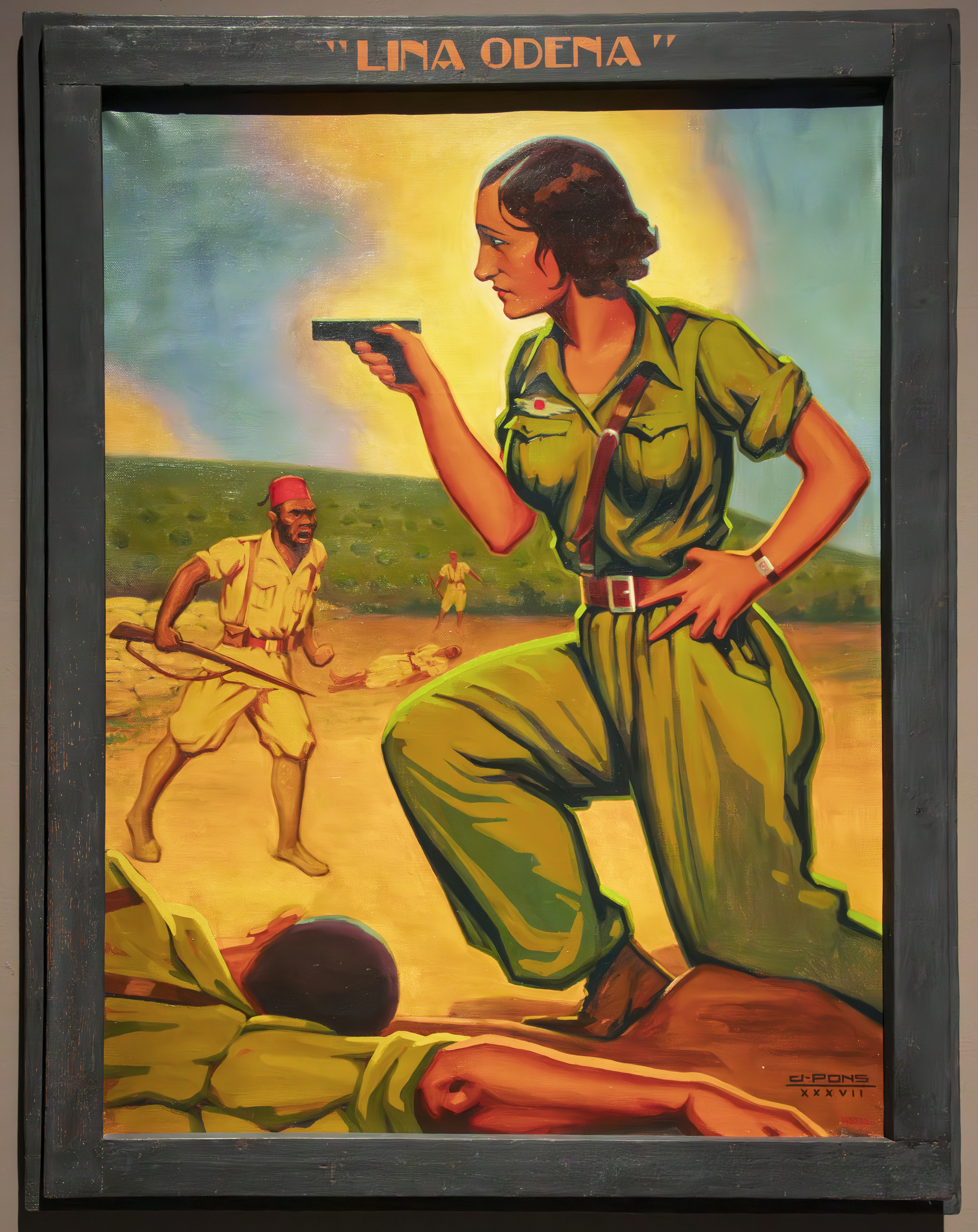
Painting of Òdena by J. Pons, Museu Nacional d'Art de Catalunya

The news of Ódena's death reached Barcelona on 22 September 1936 and was announced by the communist newspaper TREBALL. From October 1936, she was invoked as an example for women to follow by leftist newspapers who promoted the formation of the Lina Odena Battalion and called for female volunteers between 25 and 35 to join the battalion in Madrid.

== Historiography and commemoration ==
After her death, Ódena was the subject of poems and paintings, including in a poem by Peruvian writer César Vallejo, representing her as a heroine who died fighting. A square and plaque in Barcelona are dedicated to Ódena and she was featured on a postage stamp.

According to the Falangist historian Julio Belza, Ódena shot and killed a priest named Manuel Vázquez Alfaya shortly before her own death, but this was disputed by others, such as by the writer Manuel Moreno Barranco.
