= Pepita Laguarda Batet =

Catalan anarchist (1919–1936)

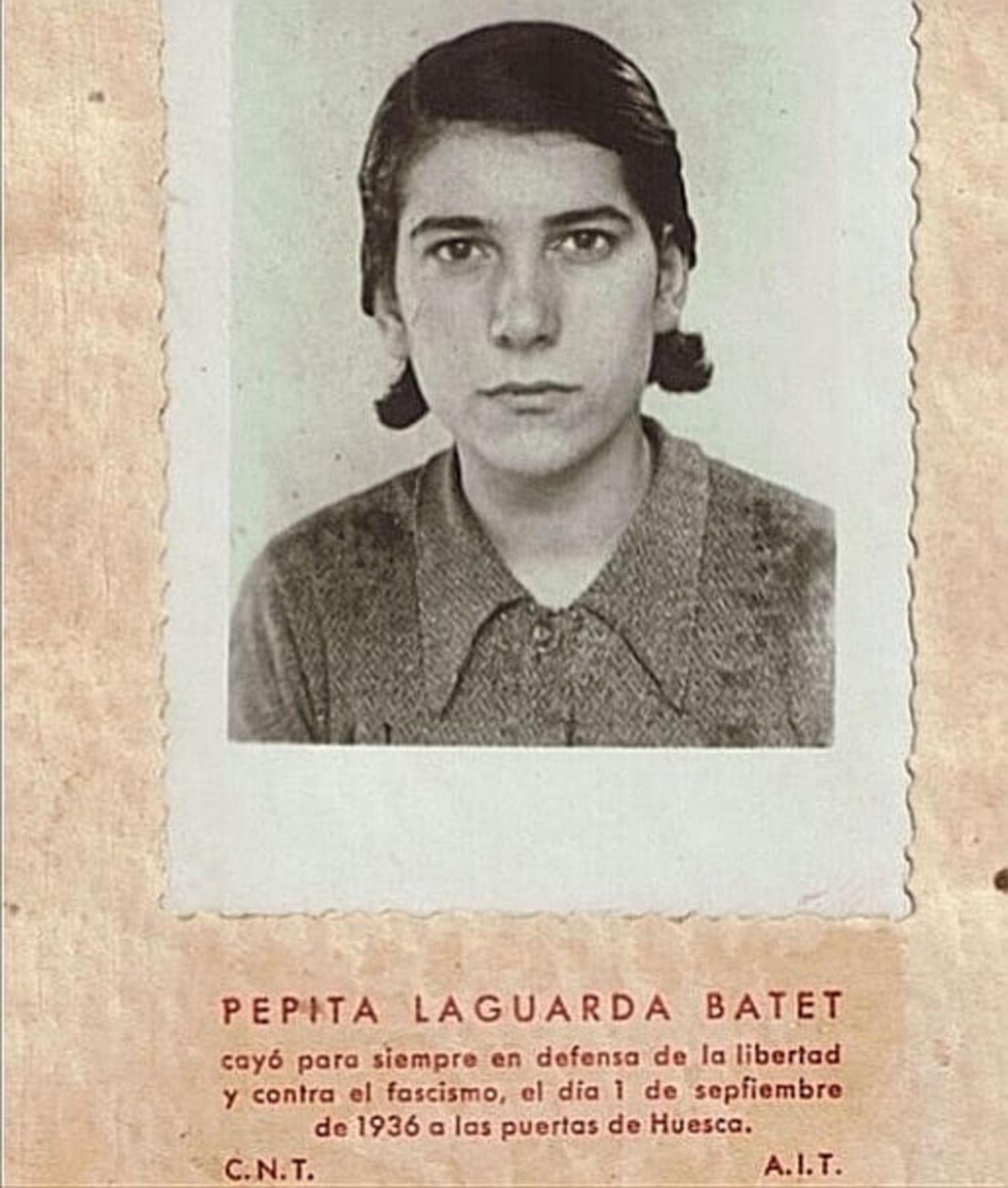
- Pepita Laguarda Batet (1936)
- Born: 1919; Barcelona, Catalunya, Spain
- Died: 2 September 1936 (aged 16–17); Granyén, Uesca, Aragón, Spain
- Military career
- Allegiance: CNT-FAI
- Service: Confederal militias
- Service years: 1936
- Unit: Ascaso Column
- Conflicts: Spanish Civil War: Battle of Barcelona; Battle of Uesca

Pepita Laguarda Batet (1919–1936), was a teenage Catalan girl and anarchist militia member who fought on the Aragon front during the Spanish Civil War. She was incorporated into the libertarian ranks without having yet reached adulthood and died in Uesca at the age of seventeen. She was the youngest soldier to die in combat during the war.

== Biography ==
Born in Barcelona, Pepita Laguarda lived in the L'Hospitalet de Llobregat district of Santa Eulàlia with her parents and three brothers. Her mother, Matilde Batet, was a working-class member of the Confederación Nacional del Trabajo (CNT) and introduced her to anarchist ideas.

When the Spanish Civil War broke out in 1936, she signed up as a nurse at a hospital in Sarrià. She soon learned that volunteers were being recruited to fight in the combat zones. She decided to enlist, against the advice of her father, who accompanied her to the recruitment centre at the Mikhail Bakunin barracks in Pedralbes to try and change her mind, but to no avail.

When she informed her boyfriend Juan López Carvajal, also a CNT activist, of her decision, he decided to follow her into the war. The young couple took up arms as part of the Ascaso Column and left to fight on the Aragon Front. On 30 August, the attack on Uesca began. On 1 September 1936, having been fighting for hours, she was seriously wounded in the shoulder under fire at 5am. She rescued by the Red Cross, which transferred her to Vicién hospital for first aid. Her condition meant she had to be taken to Granyén hospital, where she died at 9.30am, in the arms of her companion.

Juan informed Solidaridad Obrera of her death, deeply moved by the death of his first love. He wrote about his relationship with Pepita in his autobiography, published in France in 1995.

== See also ==
- Anarchism in Spain
