= Women in the Federación Anarquista Ibérica =

Women in the Federación Anarquista Ibérica were often only addressed because of what they appeared to be able to offer male FAI leadership in terms of attracting adept fighters and politicians.

The FAI as a militant anarcho-syndicalist organization came into existence prior to the dictatorship of Primo de Rivera because of differing views on government engagement, but its formalization as an organization only occurred in 1927 during a clandestine meeting which saw García Oliver chosen as their initial leader.

Despite the more liberal policies of the Second Republic, male anarchists generally opposed women's groups and women's involvement, seeing it as a threat to their own status. Men in the FAI were vehemently opposed to the creation of Mujeres Libres, a women's only anarchist organization created in response to female exclusion from the broader anarchist movement.

The Spanish Civil War saw a rise in status for the FAI among anarchist organizations. The FAI attracted milicianas (English: Militawomen) from within its ranks. It also saw one of its female members, Federica Montseny, serving as the Minister to Health in the Republican government. After the war, many former members would look back fondly at the utopian aspects of women's liberation supported by the FAI during the Second Republic and the Civil War. Many of them had to do so though from exile.

== Prelude to the Second Republic (1800–1922) ==
Federación Anarquista Ibérica (FAI), a militant anarcho-syndicalist organization, started their ideological split from the more labor based Confederación Nacional del Trabajo (CNT) shortly before the start the dictatorship of Primo de Rivera. The initial group believed the move towards being a trade union involved too much need for support among from Spanish institutions to work towards their ideals. The drift started in the period between 1920 and 1922, and intensified following the assassination of Salvador Seguí in March 1923. FAI's supporters believed CNT's anarcho-syndicalists goals could not be met by allying themselves with members of the left.

== Dictatorship of Primo de Rivera (1923–1930) ==
FAI and CNT's official rift came in 1927 during a clandestine meeting in 1927 in Valencia which saw the group's formal creation, with García Oliver chosen as their initial leader. Federica Montseny, only 22 years old at the time, was one of the only women who attended the meeting, and would go on to be one of the most visible faces of women in FAI. It would soon be positioned as the most important anarchist organization in the country. In contrast to the dominant machismo of the period found in organizations like the CNT, the FAI was radical in their support of free women. Their official positions included supporting the distribution of birth control and not condemning women for having sexual relations. In the 1920s, this group of anarchists viewed women having fewer children, increased sex education and the elimination of prostitution as positions that would provide resistance to the institutions and ideologies they opposed, including capitalism, religion and the military. These changes would also emancipate women, by defining them around a task other than reproduction.

== Second Spanish Republic (1931–1937) ==
On the whole, the anarchist movement's male leadership engaged in deliberate exclusion of women, discouraging them from seeking leadership positions in these organizations. With few exceptions, women were effectively locked out of the two largest and most important anarchist organizations in Spain, Confederación Nacional del Trabajo and the Federación Anarquista Ibérica. Women found it difficult to join the organization, and even more difficult to get leadership positions. Despite these obstacles, Federica Montseny had risen to become a member of FAI leadership by 1936. From her position, she advocated avoiding armed conflict with fascists. This view would contribute to her later being named Minister of Health in the Government of the Second Republic.

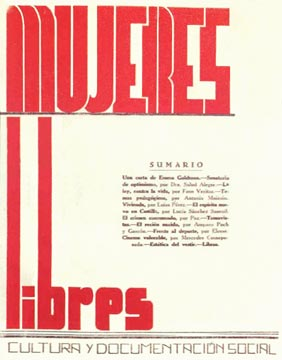
The first edition of Mujeres Libres, a magazine published by the organization of the same name

FAI opposed to the creation of Mujeres Libres, a women's only anarchist organization founded in the last days before the start of the Civil War, as they believed separating women's issues from the main anarchist organizations was sexist. They were joined in their opposition to Mujeres Libres being part of the broader anarchist movement by the CNT and Juventudes Libertarias (FIJL). FAI's male membership believed that the existence of the organization sewed dissent in the movement at a time when both men and women should be working together to advance the rights of the working class. The impact of inflexible patriarchy was that women in the FAI were forced into more submissive roles inside the organization, were forced out, or were made unwelcome. The animosity expressed by FAI, CNT and FIJL in this period bothered Mujeres Libres greatly, these women viewing anarchist leaders as believing in strict gender roles that perpetuated patriarchy and machismo. Despite general male condemnation of women's interests, Baltasar Lobo became one of the few men in this period with FAI or CNT ties who assisted the women of Mujeres Libres. He and his wife Mercedes Comaposada Guillén, together with Lucía Sánchez Saornil and Amparo Poch y Gascón created the Mujeres Libres magazine.

== Spanish Civil War (1936–1939) ==
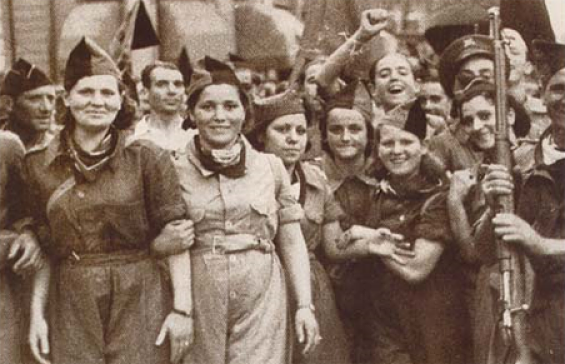
Milicianas of CNT-FAI in Barcelona in July 1936

The Confederación Nacional del Trabajo and the Federación Anarquista Ibérica continued their role in leading the anarchist movement as the Spanish Civil War period started. Representing working-class people, both groups set out to prevent the Nationalists from seizing control while also serving as reforming influences inside Spain. FAI's interest in women in this period was often less about women's emancipation than about attracting adept fighters and politicians who would help them achieve their broader goals for workers rights.

On 15 October 1936, Ziryanin reached the port in Barcelona. It was the first Russian supply ship to reach the city. Its arrival led to the masses taking to the streets in numbers not seen since 19 July 1936, the start of the Civil War. Among the throngs greeting the ship were the FAI aligned Mujeres Libres, who marched eight across while singing anarchist songs.

FAI attracted milicianas (literally Militiawomen) from within its ranks. The number of women mobilized was never high. Most joined in order to further the political ideologies they supported. Most came from militant libertarian organizations like CNT, FAI and FIJL. These militias often lacked the typical military structure in order to better represent their ideologies and better mobilize local populations.

Soledad Estorach Esterri was involved in the 18 July 1936 siege of the barracks of the Casa Cambó shipyards. After it was successfully taken, the facility became Casa CNT-FAI. During the Civil War, she also traveled around Catalonia, Aragon and Valencia, serving as a representative of CNT, FAI and JJLL . Casa CNT-FAI would soon see regular visits by FAI affiliated women including María de la Concepción Martí Fuster and Dolores Cascante. During the Civil War, Martí Fuster frequently published articles in FAI affiliated publications.

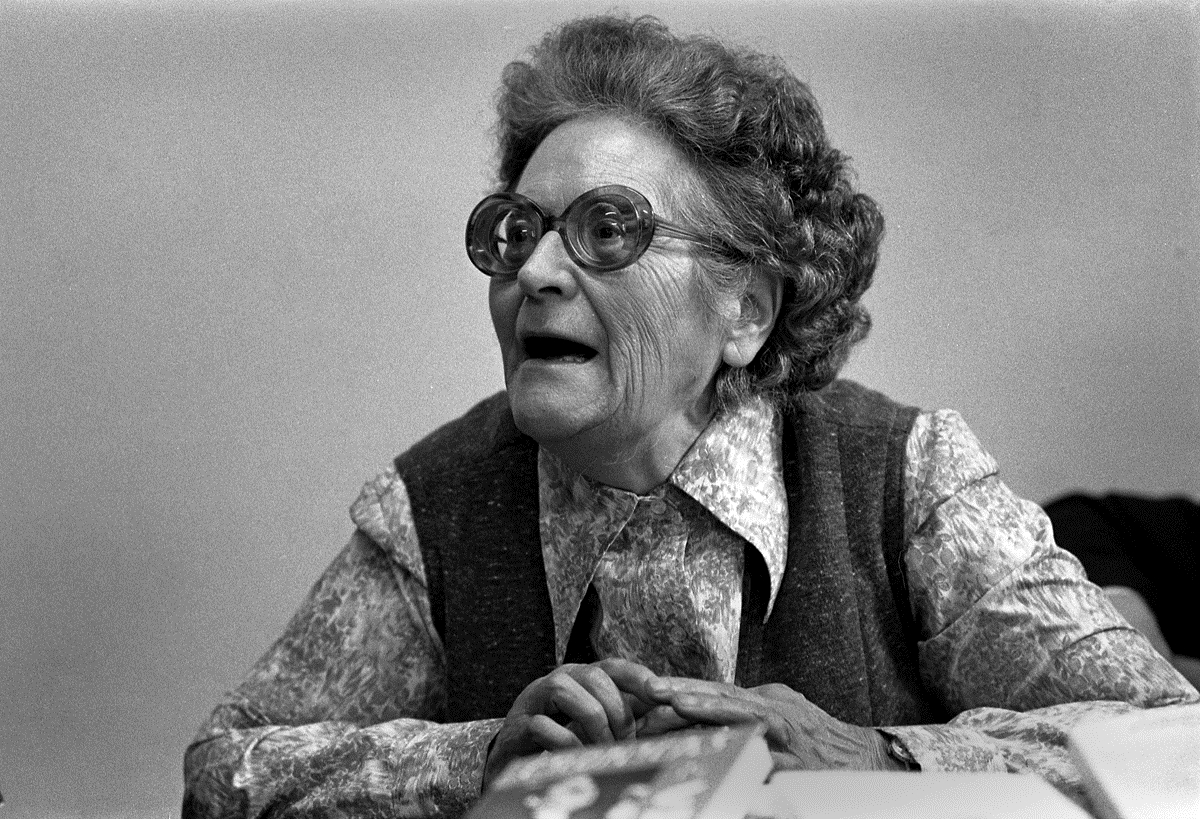
Federica Montseny in Barcelona on 1977, in her first visit from exile since 1939

Federica Montseny served as the Minister of Health, where she continued her support of anarchist organizations, only leaving this position in May 1937. She was the first woman in Spain to serve as a Minister. Her appointment along with that of three men, represented an important inclusion of both anarchist factions, CNT and CAI, into the government of the Second Republic. From her position as a CNT-FAI representative, Montseny enacted policies that allowed for the legalization of abortion in parts of Spain still controlled by Republican forces, sex education and the distribution of contraceptives.

When Juan Negrín became the head of the Republican armed forces in May 1937, women's time in combat ended as he continued efforts to regularize Republican forces into the Republican Army.

== Francoist Spain (1938–1973) ==
On the losing side of the Civil War, the survivors of FAI would appreciate their support for women's personal freedoms as a utopian aspect that supported their anarchist philosophies. Many had to do so from exile.

The end of the Civil War saw Martí Fuster removed from both FAI and CNT membership, probably as a result of her refusal to cooperate with Stalinists in their battle against Nazi Germany in France. This deeply demoralized her, and played a role in her eventual suicide on 1 December 1960. Federica Montseny also fled into exile following the fall of the Second Republic.
