= Rosario Sánchez Mora =

Spanish Civil War veteran

- Sánchez Mora while preparing the dynamite
- Born: 21 April 1919; Villarejo de Salvanés, Spain
- Died: 17 April 2008 (aged 88); Madrid, Spain
- Spouse: Paco Burcet
- Children: 1
- Military career
- Allegiance: Spanish Republic
- Branch: Spanish Republican Army
- Service years: 1936–1939
- Nickname: La Dinamitera
- Conflicts: Spanish Civil War

Rosario Sánchez Mora (21 April 1919 – 17 April 2008) was a Spanish female Republican veteran of the Spanish Civil War. She was nicknamed la Dinamitera (the Dynamiter) for her expertise with explosives, and was a Republican heroine in the Spanish Civil War.

== Early life ==
She was born in Villarejo de Salvanés to a mechanic father. Her mother died before the Civil War started, and she moved to Madrid when she was 16 to work as a seamstress.

== Spanish Civil War ==
Sánchez was one of the first women to join the Republican militias against the Nationalist forces led by General Francisco Franco. She joined the Republicans at the age of 17 on 17 July 1936, the same day that the Spanish Army first revolted against the Second Spanish Republic. Sanchez first served as one of only a few women in the front lines defending Madrid. She was the only woman in the Republican dynamiters' section. She was nicknamed, La Dinamitera, which stuck throughout the war. However, Sanchez's right hand was blown off within two months of the start of the war while she was in the trenches making explosives and other bombs. She was personally visited by Spanish philosopher, José Ortega y Gasset, while recovering in the hospital.

After her recovery, she worked first as a telephonist at military headquarters and then became a postwoman in 1937 when the Spanish government ordered all women off the front lines. A driver brought her to the military frontlines every morning to deliver mail between Republican forces and their families. However, she continued to aid the Republicans and their allies during the rest of the war. For example, she worked with Dolores Ibárruri, the President and Secretary General of the Communist Party nicknamed "La Pasionaria", to recruit women to take jobs left by men who had gone to fight the Nationalist forces. She married a young Republican sergeant, Paco Burcet in 1937, with whom she had one daughter. Burcet almost immediately left to fight in Teruel and the couple lost touch for the rest of the Spanish Civil War.

When the Nationalist forces amassed at Madrid in 1939 before the fall of the city, Sánchez buried her rifles and burned papers which linked her to the Republican cause. She left her baby daughter with relatives and left for Valencia, Spain, where the Republican government had withdrawn, in order to join her left-wing Republican father. Later they fled to Alicante hoping for ships to take them to safety. However, the ships never arrived and both were captured. Sánchez's father was executed.

== Francoist Spain years ==
Sánchez was sentenced to death "for joining the rebellion" by the victorious Francoist government. However, her sentence was commuted to thirty years in prison, of which she ultimately served three years in jail. She was released from jail in March 1942 and tried to find her husband, Paco Burcet. She learned that the Francoist State had dissolved all Republican civil marriages and that Paco had remarried and now had two sons. This left Sánchez as a single mother with a young daughter. She had a second daughter later in life.

To support herself and her family during the Francoist State, Sánchez set up and operated a cigarette stall in Madrid. She continued to sell cigarettes until her retirement. After the death of Franco, Sánchez began speaking about her experiences during the war. She wrote of her experiences as a woman during the Spanish Civil War, which was "the opportunity to fight when women didn't fight. They stayed at home. [She] lost [her] hand. It didn't matter. [She] was prepared to lose [her] life."

== Later life ==
In her eighties, Sánchez was formally recognized as one of Spain's mutilada de guerra, or war wounded, for her injuries during the Spanish Civil War.

Rosario Sánchez died on 17 April 2008, in Madrid at the age of 88.

== Poems ==
Miguel Hernández, a Spanish Republican poet who died in prison in 1942, wrote the following poem in Sánchez's honor during the Spanish Civil War.

Rosario, dinamitera,
the dynamite watched over your pretty hand
envying its fiery attributes . . .
The enemy knew well
the hand of this maiden
that is no longer a hand, because
without moving a single finger
it ignited the dynamite
and made her a star
