= Clara del Rey Calvo =

Spanish war heroine

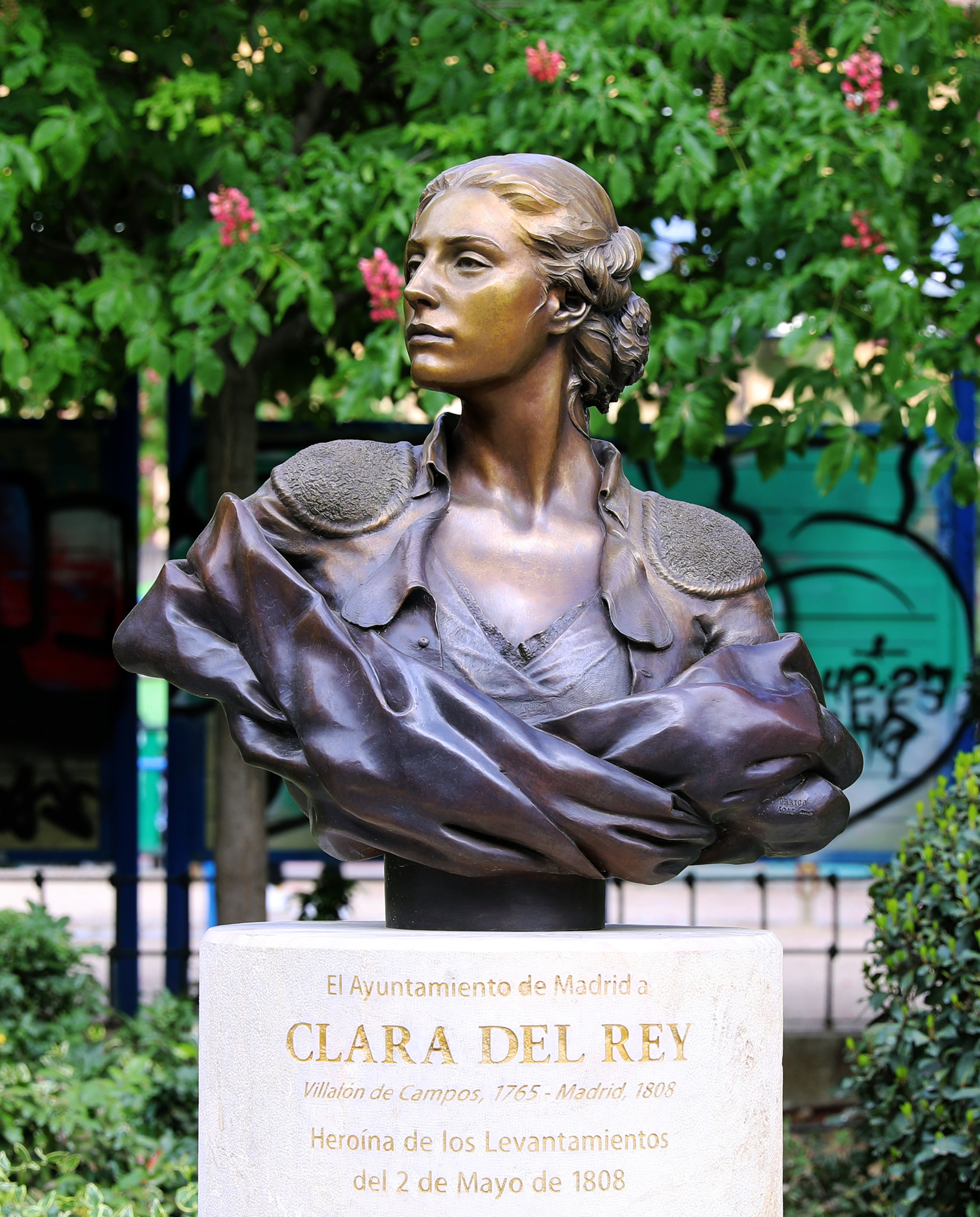
- Monument bust located in Plaza de las Comendadoras
- Born: 1765; Villalón de Campos, Spain
- Died: May 2, 1808 (aged 42–43); Madrid, Spain
- Movement: Dos de Mayo Uprising

Clara del Rey Calvo (1765 - 1808) was a Spanish woman involved in war. She was married to a soldier, Manuel González Blanco, and participated with her husband in the street fight battle of the Dos de Mayo Uprising in Madrid, where she was killed. Her two children were awarded a medal for her act. A street in Madrid is also named for her.
