= Elisa García Sáez =

Spanish military personnel (1916–1936)

- Born: 22 September 1916; Sant Andreu de Palomar, Barcelona, Catalonia, Spain
- Died: 24 August 1936 (aged 19); Sarinyena, Huesca, Spain
- Military career
- Allegiance: Republican faction
- Service: Confederal militias
- Service years: 1936
- Conflicts: Spanish Civil War

Elisa García Sáez (1916-1936) was a trade unionist, radical feminist and anti-fascist who fought as a militiawoman in the Spanish Civil War.

== Biography ==
Elisa García Sáez was born in 1916, in the Sant Andreu district of Barcelona. She worked in the district's Fabra i Coats factory, where she first became involved in feminist and syndicalist activism, joining a young women's cooperative, as well as the General Union of Workers (UGT) and the Workers' Party of Marxist Unification (POUM).

Following the outbreak of the Spanish Civil War, she took up arms and joined a column of the confederal militias on the Aragon Front. She was seriously injured during the bombardment of Tardienta by the Nationalists. She was transferred to the Republican hospital at Sarinyena, where she died of her injuries, on 24 August 1936. She was one of the first militiawoman to die during the war.

Her obituary in Solidaridad Obrera declared:

"[...] She did not accept a non-military role for women, since she understood that they had to fight like men and it was only up to cowards to refuse armed struggle [...]."

== Recognition ==
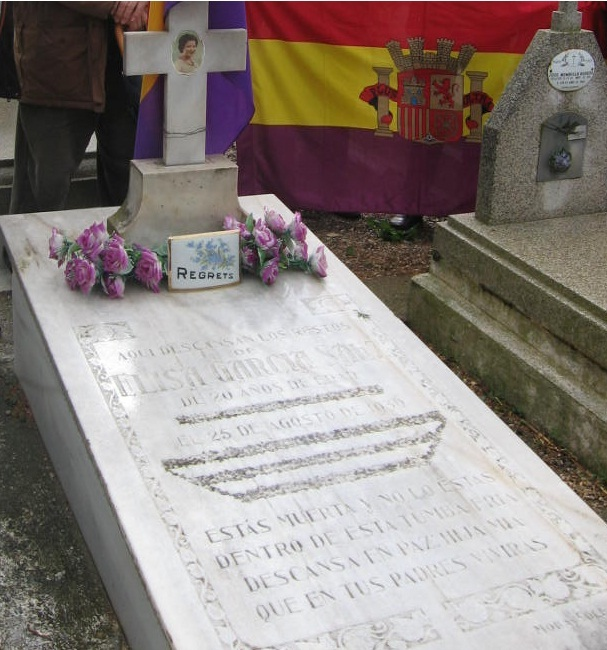
The restored epitaph on Elisa García Sáez's tombstone

The deaths of the first militiawomen caused a stir on the Republican side. The news about the death of Elisa García was collected in the newspaper ABC, which published the final words that Elisa wrote in a letter to her mother, Teresa:

"[...] Don't feel sorry for me; I will see to it that nothing happens to me: but if something happened to me by chance, think that others like me would have fallen too. If I knew that by giving my life I could end the murders of the working class, I would gladly give it. If you were told that fighting is not for women, say that the performance of revolutionary duty belongs to every person who is not a coward. [...]"

A street in Sant Andreu, Carrer de les Monges, was renamed in her honour by the Republicans, but following the fall of Catalonia in 1939, its name was reverted to its original form by the Nationalists. Currently there is a plaque that mentions it on the corner with Carrer Sócrates.

During the dictatorship of Francisco Franco, the epitaph on Elisa García's tombstone was damaged with a hammer and chisel by order of the Francoist mayor of Sarinyena. It was left illegible, which moved a group of the town's residents to try to restore it. On 14 April 2012, the anniversary of the proclamation of the Second Spanish Republic, a tribute was paid to Elisa García Sáez in the municipal cemetery of Sarinyena. Several residents of the locality remembered the figure of the militiawoman, making a call to the population to help recover the deleted words and to restore their memory.

In October 2018, a garden named after her was inaugurated in Carrer del Cinca, in her home neighbourhood of Sant Andreu de Palomar.
