= Grañén =

Town in Aragon, Spain

Coordinates: 41°56′N 0°22′W

Coat of arms of Grañén

Grañén (Aragonese Granyén) is a small town in the Monegros region of the Province of Huesca, Aragón, Spain. It is at a low elevation on the Monegros Plain, and has 2100 inhabitants. Grañén shares its capital with Sariñena in the subregion of the Flumen.

During the Spanish Civil War a field hospital was installed in the village by the British Medical Aid Unit, owing to its proximity to the front line at Huesca. It was later moved to nearby Poleñino. A diary was kept by Agnes Hodgson, an Australian nurse who worked at both hospitals in 1937, providing a detailed account of conditions there. When she arrived back in Australia she told a reporter: “Never have I seen such dreadful wounds and suffering as those that result from warfare. What I have seen in Spain has made me a militant pacifist for ever.”

In 2011, all 180 series of the number 58.268, first price in the Spanish Christmas Lottery, were sold fully in Grañén, distributing €720 million across the town.

== See also ==
- List of municipalities in Huesca
