= Rosa Durruti =

- Born: Rosa Durruti Dumange c. 1890s León, Spain
- Died: c. 1980s León, Spain
- Parents: Santiago Durruti (father); Anastasia Dumange (mother)
- Relatives: Buenaventura and Pedro Durruti (brothers)

Rosa Durruti Dumange (c. 1890s – c. 1980s) was the sister of the Spanish anarchist revolutionary Buenaventura Durruti and the Falangist activist Pedro Durruti. Throughout the 1920s and 1930s, she helped her brother, Buenaventura, evade the authorities and kept in contact with him while he was in prison. After her brothers were killed in the Spanish Civil War, she remained in her home city of León, where she became a key primary source on their early lives.

== Biography ==
Rosa Durruti was the first child, and only daughter, of Santiago Durruti (Note: Her father's surname, "Durruti", was derived from the Basque word "Urruti" ("far away") and referred to Basques who lived in the mountains far away from urban centres.) and Anastasia Dumange. (Note: Her mother's Catalan surname, "Dumange", was sometimes Castilianised to "Domínguez".) As she was the oldest sibling, she contributed to the housekeeping, cooking for her younger brothers and doing their laundry. Their family grew up in poverty; her brother Buenaventura told her that their experiences with poverty turned him into a rebel. In 1919, when Buenaventura escaped from military service and went into hiding, Rosa kept his friends updated about his activities and helped him hide out in the mountains and eventually cross over into France. In 1923, Buenaventura was arrested and imprisoned without charge in San Sebastián; he told Rosa that he did not know why he was still being detained and requested that she prevent their mother from visiting him in San Sebastián, in order to spare her from seeing him behind bars. She kept in touch with Buenaventura after he was arrested for trying to assassinate Alfonso XIII in Paris, even as their brother Benedicto felt too ashamed to write to him. Facing the possibility of execution, Buenaventura encouraged Rosa to take care of their mother, saying: "you not only have to be her daughter, but also her comrade".

After the proclamation of the Second Spanish Republic, Buenaventura returned to Spain and settled in Barcelona. At her mother's behest, Rosa visited him there and reported that her brother and his partner (Émilienne Morin) lived in squalid conditions, without even a mattress to sleep on. Back in León, her brother was still wanted by the authorities. After Leonese police searched her house, looking for her brother, Rosa sent him a letter warning him that a warrant for his arrest had been printed in the Official Bulletin of Asturias (BOA). Rosa was the first to hear from her brother that his partner had given birth to a daughter, Colette; her brother told Rosa that his daughter closely resembled her and reassured her that they were now buying all the essentials, including furniture. In December 1931, Rosa informed her brother that their father had fallen gravely ill and requested he come back to León to say his final goodbye. Their father died before he made it there.

After her brother Pedro joined the Falange Española de las JONS in 1936, Rosa embroidered the yoke and arrows onto his blue uniform. When Buenaventura was killed in action while fighting in the siege of Madrid, Pedro was the one to break the news to Rosa and her mother. Pedro himself was later executed by the Francoist dictatorship. Rosa was one of only three siblings that survived the Spanish Civil War. Rosa remained in her home city of León with her mother, where they continued to be highly respected by their fellow citizens, even after the war. After the death of her mother, in 1969, she sent a letter about her family to Angel Montoto Ferrer, which became a primary source for Hans Magnus Enzensberger's book about her brother Buenaventura. Rosa also acted as a source for Abel Paz's biography on Buenaventura, providing him with vital information about her brother's early life. Throughout the 1970s, she made a number of trips to Paris to visit her niece Colette, her sister-in-law Émilienne, and her brother's former comrade Ricardo Sanz. According to Émilienne Morin, in an interview in 1977, Rosa married quite late into her life.

== Bibliography ==
- Álvarez Rodríguez, Chema (22 April 2025). "En memoria de Colette". El Salto (in Spanish). ISSN 2530-5913.
- Costa Muste, Pedro (2024) [1977]. "Durruti's Widow Speaks for the First Time: The Love and Struggle of an Anarchist". Kate Sharpley Library. Translated by Sharkey, Paul.
- Enzensberger, Hans Magnus (2018) [1972]. Anarchy's Brief Summer: The Life and Death of Buenaventura Durruti. Translated by Mitchell, Mike. Seagull Books. ISBN 9780857426000. OCLC 1077270536.
- Gallart Fernàndez, Felip; Lladonosa Giró, Vicent (2020). "Pepita Not i la lluita per la llibertat (1897-1938)". Mascançà: Revista d'estudis del Pla d'Urgell (in Spanish). 11: 57–65. ISSN 2014-4814.
- García de Tuñón Aza, José María (April 2009). "Marciano Pedro Durruti Domingo". El Catoblepas (in Spanish) (86): 21. ISSN 1579-3974.
- Paz, Abel (2006) [1996]. Durruti in the Spanish Revolution. Translated by Morse, Chuck. Edinburgh: AK Press. ISBN 1-904859-50-X. LCCN 2006920974. OCLC 482919277.
- Zavala, José María (14 December 2021). "Consigna: matar al hermano falangista de Durruti". La Razón (in Spanish). ISSN 1576-7094.
