= Miro =

Miro or Miró may refer to:

== Companies ==
- Miro (collaboration platform), a collaborative online whiteboard tool
- Miro Company, a French game manufacturer
- Miro Technologies, a Maintenance, Repair and Overhaul (MRO) software supplier from California
- Pinnacle Systems, Miro Video series of the video capture cards
- Member of the Institution of Railway Operators (changed to MCIRO in October 2021)
- Mineraloelraffinerie Oberrhein, the largest oil refinery in Germany

== People ==
- Miro (given name)
- Miró (surname)

== Entertainment ==
- Miro (video software), an Internet television application
- Miromusic, an electronic dance band originally from Denmark
- Giardini di Mirò, an Italian rock group
- "Miro", a song by the rock band Finch
- Miro, a character in the Ender's Game series by Orson Scott Card
- Miro (band), chill out ambient music pioneers

== Other uses ==
- Miro (protein) a subfamily of ras proteins
- Miro (tree), Pectinopitys ferruginea, an evergreen coniferous tree endemic to New Zealand
- Thespesia populnea, a flowering plant of the mallow family, known as miro in Polynesia.
- Miro manga erua, a sledge device
- Miró Quartet, classical string quartet based in Austin, Texas
- Mojahedin of the Islamic Revolution Organization, a reformist Iranian political organization

== See also ==
- Miró Quesada, Hispanic surname
