= Émilienne Morin =

French anarcho-syndicalist (1901–1991)

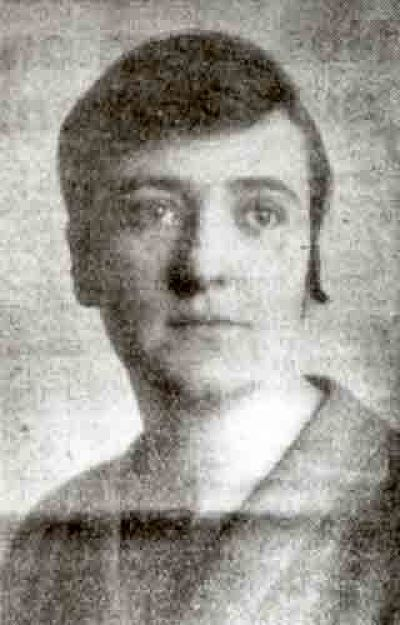
- Morin in 1935
- Born: 29 October 1901; Angers, Maine-et-Loire, France
- Died: 14 February 1991 (aged 89); Kemper, Britanny, France
- Other name: Mimi Morin
- Occupations: Stenographer, usher, journalist
- Organisation: National Confederation of Labour
- Movement: Anarcho-syndicalism
- Spouse: Mario Cascari (m. 1924; div. 1927)
- Partner: Buenaventura Durruti (1927–1936)
- Children: Colette Durruti
- Military career
- Service: Confederal militias
- Service years: 1936–1937
- Role: Administrator
- Unit: Durruti Column
- Conflicts: Spanish Civil War: Battle of Barcelona; Aragon front

Émilienne Léontine Morin (French pronunciation: [emiljɛn mɔʁɛ̃]; 29 October 1901 – 14 February 1991) was a French anarchist activist, journalist and stenographer. Born into an anarcho-syndicalist family, she joined the French anarchist movement at an early age, going on to write for its newspapers and contribute to anarchist legal defence campaigns. In 1927, she met and fell in love with Buenaventura Durruti, a Spanish anarchist in whose legal defence she had participated. She followed him to Belgium, where she lived a semi-clandestine life until the proclamation of the Second Spanish Republic. She then moved to Barcelona and joined the National Confederation of Labour (CNT). Morin struggled in her new home due to a lack of understanding the Spanish language, the sexism expressed by many Spanish male anarchists, and Durruti's prolonged absence from her life. She raised their child, Colette, as a single parent, as Durruti spent most of the subsequent years in exile or prison. Following the outbreak of the Spanish Civil War, she joined her companion on the Aragon front, where she was an administrator for the Durruti Column. Morin left Spain with her daughter when Durruti was killed in action during the Siege of Madrid. She remained active among the Spanish exiles until her retirement and later became a key primary source about her companion's life.

== Biography ==
=== Early life and activism ===
Émilienne Morin was born in the city of Angers, in the Loire Valley, on 29 October 1901. She was the daughter of Étienne Morin, an anarcho-syndicalist construction worker, and Ernestine Giroux, a factory worker. Through her parents, Morin was exposed to anarchist politics and became involved in revolutionary groups at an early age. At the age of 15, she moved to Paris, where she worked for the antimilitarist newspaper Ce qu'il faut dire. She settled in the city's 15th arrondissement, where she later joined a syndicalist youth group, becoming a member of its executive committee in 1923. In 1924, she married an Italian anarchist called Mario Cascari, but the marriage was short-lived. By 1927, she had divorced him.

=== Meeting Durruti and move to Belgium ===
By the mid-1920s, Morin was deeply involved in the French anarchist movement, participating in defence campaigns for the Italian-American anarchists Sacco and Vanzetti and for the Spanish anarchists Buenaventura Durruti, Francisco Ascaso and Gregorio Jover (Los Errantes). After Durruti's release from prison, on 14 July 1927, Morin met him at the International Anarchist Bookshop on the Rue des Prairies; the two quickly fell in love and became each other's lifelong companion. They continued to see each other until Durruti was arrested and imprisoned in Lyon. When she went there to visit him, it was the first time that she had ever seen the inside of a prison. After his release from prison, Durruti moved to Germany and then on to Belgium. Before joining him there, Morin continued to work in France while she helped pay off her parents' mortgage. She then quit her job as a stenographer and joined him in Brussels.

In the Belgian capital, Morin took an assumed identity, having borrowed travel papers from a friend without even changing its photograph. When she reunited with Durruti, he warned her that they would be living a difficult life, to which she replied that she did not join him "to lead an easy life, but a life of dignity". Together they lived a semi-clandestine life, without much freedom and facing financial difficulties. After a few months in Belgium, Morin found some temporary work, leaving Durruti to do the housework while she brought in a small income. During this time, Morin met the Spanish anarchists Juan Manuel Molina and Lola Iturbe, who described her as a pleasant young woman with a "boyish" haircut. Her outspoken personality and anarchist convictions also led her into frequent public confrontations with communist activists at the Maison du Peuple.

=== Life in Barcelona ===
Following the proclamation of the Second Spanish Republic, in May 1931, Morin followed Durruti to Barcelona and joined the growing Spanish anarchist movement. Morin soon joined the ranks of the National Confederation of Labour (CNT), writing for its publications and participating in its political demonstrations. She found life in emigration difficult, due to her lack of ability to speak the Spanish language; this meant she was unable to continue her profession as a stenographer and instead had to work as a cleaner. She reported that the political environment in Barcelona was very different than that of Paris, and thought that the Spanish anarchists "seemed a bit simple-minded, a bit elementary". She also expressed surprise that women played such a small role in the anarchist movement, as most anarchist men believed that a woman's place was in the home and thus excluded them from political activism. She also rarely saw Durruti during her first months in Spain, as he spent most of his time between political meetings and his job.

Morin and Durruti lived in squalid conditions; while pregnant, Morin slept on a bare box-spring without a mattress and Durruti refused offers from his sister to buy her one. On 4 December 1931, Morin gave birth to a daughter, Colette Durruti. With money from an indemnity Durruti had charged a former employer, Morin bought their daughter all the essentials needed to care for her and several items of furniture, including a new mattress. Durruti reported to his sister that Morin "treat[ed] Colette like a princess". Shortly after Colette's birth, the family travelled to León to attend the funeral of Durruti's father Santiago.

In the wake of the Alt Llobregat insurrection in January 1932, Durruti was arrested and deported from Barcelona in the direction of Spain's African colonies. In a letter to the French Anarchist Federation, Morin reported that most of the deportees had not participated in the insurrection and that Durruti had been separated from the other prisoners after attempting to incite a hunger strike. She declared that the Spanish anarchist movement would continue to fight, in spite of the political repression, and would seek revenge for the deportations: "an eye for an eye, a tooth for a tooth; that should be our maxim". Her demand was taken up by Francisco Ascaso and Joan Garcia Oliver, who saw the deportations as a reflection of the desperation of the Spanish ruling class and called for a social revolution to overthrow it. When Durruti reached Fuerteventura in April 1932, Morin sent him the first letter he had received since his deportation. She informed him that their daughter had fallen very sick, which was difficult for him to read.

Without Durruti there to help, Morin was forced to raise their newborn as a single parent. Through the CNT, she found a job as an usher at the Goya Theatre. She entrusted fellow CNT activist Teresa Margaleff to care for Colette while she was at work. During this time, Morin constantly had to move flats as she was often unable to pay her rent. She was only able to see Colette once per week, during her days off. She said that, during this period, she lived "the wretched life of women whose men are professional revolutionaries".

In early 1932, Morin had complained to French anarchists that the Republican government was continuing to repress the working class while allowing the right-wing to openly conspire against it. In August 1932, reactionary military officers led by José Sanjurjo staged a military coup to overthrow the Republic, but it was defeated with the help of the CNT. The suppression of the coup led to an amnesty for anarchist political prisoners. By September, Durruti arrived back in Barcelona after six months away from his family. He was quickly arrested after giving a speech at a rally, once again causing her personal and financial difficulties. After his release in December 1932, he soon informed her that he was meeting with the Nosotros group to plan another anarchist insurrection. When the insurrection was suppressed, Durruti was forced into hiding at Margaleff's house, where he spent more time together with Morin and their daughter than he had at any other moment. He was eventually arrested and imprisoned in Seville, where he informed Morin of the conditions in the prison and the protests they had made when their comrades were prevented from visiting them.

When Durruti was finally released from prison in May 1934, he and Morin moved into a flat in Sants. While Morin continued working at the Goya Theatre, Durruti had been blacklisted and was unable to find a job, so he attended to the housework and cared for their daughter. On one occasion, when another anarchist - Manuel Pérez - made fun of Durruti for doing "women's work", Morin questioned the man's commitment to gender equality and called him "underdeveloped" in comparison with her companion.

=== Spanish Civil War ===
In the lead up to the Spanish coup of July 1936, Durruti began military training to prepare for what they knew was coming. He and other anarchists began practicing with a rifle at a firing range in the neighbourhood, but kept this secret from Morin, who found out from her neighbours. She later complained that she was always the last person to know about Durruti's revolutionary activities, which kept her on the sidelines of his political activism. When the military uprising finally happened, Morin observed the fighting in Barcelona, but she was not allowed to take up a rifle herself. She watched Francisco Ascaso die outside the metalworkers' union building; she later said it looked to her like a suicide, as had he ran out towards the Nationalist barracks by himself.

With the outbreak of the Spanish Civil War, Morin joined her companion's self-titled Durruti Column, leaving their daughter behind in Margaleff's care. She climbed into a lorry that was loaded with food and set off for the Aragon front. Upon her arrival in Burcharaloz, Durruti found out she was on one of the lorries. He acknowledged her with a look, then moved on without saying a word. She quickly set to work organising the administrative apparatus of the Durruti Column, and took charge of its press department. She soon became known by the nom de guerre of "Mimi-FAI". On one occasion, she recalled flying to Madrid with Durruti in André Malraux's plane. Upon arrival, Durruti ordered the local police to give them their files about the two of them.

In November 1936, when Durruti went to fight in the defence of Madrid, Morin decided to leave the front and return to Barcelona to care for their daughter. She had a brief phone call with him during the Battle of Ciudad Universitaria, but he was in too much of a rush to talk to her for long. The last thing he said to her was that he would see her again soon. But on 20 November, Morin received a visit from a CNT member, who told her that Durruti had been killed in action. His funeral was held three days later. At his funeral service, Morin was addressed by Joan Garcia Oliver in his capacity as Minister of Justice; he said that she represented all the women who were widowed in their war against fascism. After her companion's death, the Republican government offered to promote Morin to the rank of lieutenant colonel, but she refused. For a brief period, she instead worked for the CNT defence council. In an article for Le Libertaire, she interpreted Durruti's last words ("We renounce everything except victory") to mean the victory of the confederal militias and the Spanish Revolution over the Nationalists, and called on French workers to support it.

=== Later life ===
In 1937, Morin left Spain with her daughter and returned to France, where she organised support for the Spanish Revolution from abroad; she never returned to Spain. The Catalan journalist Jaume Miravitlles later claimed that, in November 1937, Morin had attended a banquet in Barcelona; according to Miravitlles, she said that she would publicly accept the official account of his death, but that she privately believed he had been murdered by someone close to him. Morin herself later said to Abel Paz that she had never met Miravitlles or attended a banquet with him. Paz therefore concluded that Miravitlles' claim had been false.

Morin moved to Villa Stendhal, in the 20th arrondissement of Paris, and in October 1937, she rented an office on the Boulevard Saint-Denis to serve as the CNT's Press and Information Office. She also joined International Antifascist Solidarity (SIA) and wrote about her experiences in the Spanish Civil War for Le Libertaire. In April 1939, her eulogy to Durruti was translated into Chinese and published in an anthology by the Chinese anarchist Ba Jin. Following the end of the Spanish Civil War and World War II, she continued organising with the Spanish anarchist movement until the end of her life. She later reported that the Spanish exiles were well-organised, continuing to pay their union dues and print their newspapers. She described many of them as naive, saying that they believed they could one day return to Spain and reignite the revolution, but she herself believed that the time for that had passed: "you can't have the same revolution a second time".

She later retired to the Breton town of Kemper. There she was interviewed by Hans Magnus Enzensberger in May 1971. She complained to him that many people, including even business owners and the Catholic Church, had attempted to recuperate Durruti's image and use his memory for their own purposes. She also acted as a primary source for Abel Paz's biography Durruti in the Spanish Revolution and provided Paz with the address of Rosa Durruti. Morin died in Kemper on 14 February 1991.

== Selected works ==
- "A mi gran ausente" (Mujeres Libres, December 1936)
- "Letter" (Le Libertaire, 14 February 1937)
- "Souvenirs: l'enfantement d'une révolution" (Le Libertaire, 7 July 1938)
- "Nuestra Victoria" (Le Libertaire, 17 November 1938)

== Bibliography ==
- Bianco, René; Dupuy, Rolf (7 October 2024) [2014-04-09]. "MORIN Émilienne, Léontine [dite Mimi Durruti]". Dictionnaire des anarchistes. Le Maitron (in French). Éditions de l'Atelier. ISBN 9782708242685.
- Enzensberger, Hans Magnus (2018) [1972]. Anarchy's Brief Summer: The Life and Death of Buenaventura Durruti. Translated by Mitchell, Mike. Seagull Books. ISBN 9780857426000. OCLC 1077270536.
- Espílez Murciano, Felipe (3 May 2020). "Émilienne Morin, Mimi-FAI". Encima de la Niebla (in Spanish). ISSN 2695-5245.
- Paz, Abel (2006) [1996]. Durruti in the Spanish Revolution. Translated by Morse, Chuck. AK Press. ISBN 1-904859-50-X. LCCN 2006920974. OCLC 482919277.
- Pino, Angel (2014). "Ba Jin as Translator". In Peng, Hsiao-yen; Rabut, Isabelle (eds.). Modern China and the West: Translation and Cultural Mediation. Brill. pp. 28–105. doi:10.1163/9789004270220_004. ISBN 9789004270220.
- Reynolds, Siân (2000). "The lost generation of french feminists? anti-fascist women in the 1930s". Women's Studies International Forum. 23 (6): 679–688. doi:10.1016/s0277-5395(00)00139-4.
- Vollmeyer, Johanna (2018). "Spain in our hearts". Journal of Romance Studies. 18 (3): 439–458. doi:10.3828/jrs.2018.26. ISSN 1752-2331.
