= Miró (surname) =

- Language: Spanish

Origin
- Meaning: "Insignia, Eminent"
- Region of origin: Spain, France, México and Argentina

Other names
- Variant forms: Mirón, Miralles

Miró is a Spanish language surname, literally meaning either "insignia" or "eminent". The surname originated in the County of Ribagorza in Spain.

== People with the surname ==
- Antonio Miró (1947–2022), Spanish fashion designer
- Antonio Miró Montilla (born 1937), Puerto Rican architect and educator
- Carme Laura Gil i Miró (born 1935), Spanish professor and politician
- Celestino Iriarte Miró (1887–1967), Puerto Rican politician and senator
- César Miró (1907–1999), Peruvian composer and writer
- Cris Miró (1965–1999), Argentine entertainer and actress
- Daham Miro (1921–2010), Kurdish political leader
- Darcy Miro (born 1973), American metal artist
- Doug Miro (born 1972), American screenwriter
- Eddie Miró (1935–2024), Puerto Rican entertainer and comedian
- Esteban Rodríguez Miró (1744–1795), Spanish marshal and governor
- Francisca Saperas Mirò (1851–1933), Spanish anarchist
- Feliza Teresa Miro (born 1953), Filipino beauty pageant winner and mayor
- Gabriel Miró (1879–1930), Spanish writer
- Gina R. Méndez-Miró (born 1974), Puerto Rican jurist
- Gisele Miró (born 1968), Brazilian tennis player
- Gonzalo Miró (born 1981), Spanish television presenter
- Henri Miro (1879–1950), Spanish–Canadian composer and pianist
- Jaime Ayguadé Miró (1882–1943), Spanish physician and writer
- Joan Miró (1893–1983), Spanish painter and sculptor
- Jorge Loring Miró (1921–2013), Spanish Jesuit
- José María Miró (1872–1946), Spanish sports shooter
- José Miró Argenter (1851–1925), Spanish–Cuban general
- José Miró Cardona (1902–1974), 14th President of Cuba
- Joseph Miró (born 1946), Cuban-American politician
- Juan Miró, Spanish–American professor
- Kira Miró (born 1980), Spanish actress and television presenter
- Luis Miró (1913–1991), Spanish footballer
- María Dolores Miró (1930–2004), Spanish painter and historian
- Mickaël Miro (born 1978), French singer-songwriter
- Mireia Miró Varela (born 1988), Spanish skier and runner
- Pedro Miró (1918–1996), Cuban baseball player
- Pilar Miró (1940–1997), Spanish screenwriter and film director
- Raül Fernández Miró (born 1976), Spanish music producer and composer
- Ricardo Miró (1883–1940), Panamanian writer
- Sergio López Miró (born 1968), Spanish swimmer
- Victoria Miro (born 1945), English art dealer
