= Anastasia Dumange =

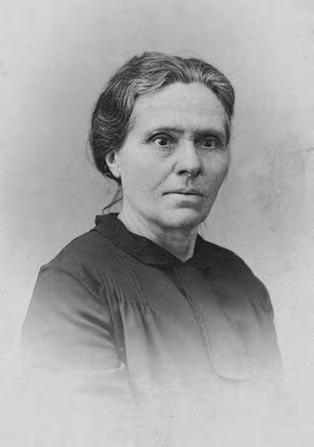
- Born: Anastasia Dumange Soler; 1876; León, Spain
- Died: 1968 (aged 91–92); León, Spain
- Spouse: Santiago Durruti (m. 1892; died 1931)
- Children: 8 (including Buenaventura, Pedro and Rosa)
- Parents: Pedro Dumange (father); Rosa Soler (mother)

Anastasia Dumange Soler (1876–1968) was the mother of the anarchist revolutionary Buenaventura Durruti. Born in León to Catalan parents, she married Santiago Durruti, with whom she had eight children (including Buenaventura, Pedro and Rosa). After the suppression of a strike which her husband had led, her father lost his business and the family fell into poverty. Over the course of the 1920s and early 1930s, Dumange struggled with continuous news of her son's illicit activities and his multiple imprisonments. During the 1930s, she watched her husband and five of her children die in the social conflicts of the period. After the Spanish Civil War, she remained in León, where she continued to be a respected member of the community. Shortly before her death, she acted as a primary source on her son's early life, providing information for a biography on him written by Abel Paz.

== Biography ==
=== Early life and family ===
Anastasia Dumange Soler was born in León, in 1876. Her father, Pedro Dumange, was from a Catalan family from the province of Girona and had emigrated to the city for unknown reasons. After arriving in the city, he married a Catalan woman Rosa Soler. In official records, the Catalan name Dumange was Castilianised to "Domínguez". At the age of sixteen, Anastasia Dumange married Santiago Durruti. They lived together in the Santa Ana neighbourhood of León, where they had seven sons and a daughter: Santiago, Buenaventura, Vicente, Plateo, Benedicto, Pedro, Manuel and Rosa. Dumange also took in a young Florentino Monroy, whose mother died when he was seven years old, and raised him alongside her own children.

=== Motherhood ===
Dumange and Durruti raised their children at a time when the Spanish Empire was collapsing, with the loss of its colonies causing an economic decline in the country. This intensified social conflicts in Spain, with strike actions becoming increasingly common in the northern industrial regions of Asturias, the Basque Country and Catalonia. Their family and neighbours lived through great economic hardship during this period. Dumange's husband earned only a small salary, but they were able to support their family with help from her father Pedro. In 1903, Dumange's husband and her brother-in-law Ignacio led a tanners' strike in León, demanding higher wages and a shorter working day. The strike was repressed and the family's businesses were boycotted by the tanning company owners, causing Pedro Dumange's business to collapse. Facing increased financial difficulties, Dumange sent her children to a school run by Ricardo Fanjul, which was the only one that they were able to afford. The family was often unable to even afford bread, which often caused Dumange to break down in tears in front of her children.

In 1909, Dumange's son Santiago was called up for military service and dispatched to Morocco to fight in the Second Melillan campaign; as her son left, Dumange wept and her father punched his legs in anger. Her father had hoped that Buenaventura, Dumange's second child, would go on to study at the University of Valladolid, but he instead decided to become a worker like his father. Buenaventura began his apprenticeship as a mechanic in 1910; he was unhappy with his low wages, but Dumange convinced him it was worth it to learn a trade and become independent. Within a few years, he had become a skilled mechanic, but he was dismissed following the 1917 Spanish general strike and forced into clandestinity.

=== Reactions to Buenaventura's militancy ===
In early 1923, Dumange visited Buenaventura at his prison cell in San Sebastián; he had been caught and arrested in Madrid, and detained without charge. He pleaded to his sister Rosa to prevent her from visiting him again, worried about the toll the trip was taking on his mother. On 17 May 1923, Bilbao governor Fernando González Regueral was assassinated in León by members of Los Solidarios, but the police never caught them. In the aftermath, the Leonese press published speculations that a local anarchist group, led by Dumange's imprisoned son Buenaventura, had carried out the attack. Not knowing who the perpretrators were, the Leonese police carried out a series of arbitrary arrests. Dumange's son Santiago was detained and the police attempted to arrest her husband, who was very ill and confined to his bed, but Dumange and her neighbours prevented them from taking him in.

During Dumange's visit to see Buenaventura in prison, he had promised her that he would immediately return to León after he was released, but he instead went off to continue his illicit activities. After Buenaventura participated in a bank robbery in Xixón, Dumange became one of the most famous women in León. She was often asked about the exploits of her son, but she disregarded the reports, stating that whenever he returned to León she would have to mend his tattered clothes and shoes, so she believed he could not have become wealthy from bank robberies. Buenaventura was later imprisoned again in Paris for attempting to assassinate Alfonso XIII. He kept his family up to date with his appeals, in order to keep Dumange calm, and told her to ignore what journalists said about him. Facing the possibility of execution, he asked his sister Rosa to support their mother, as he was worried about the pain his imprisonment was causing her. However, in July 1927, he was released by order of Raymond Poincaré's government; he lamented that his mother was not there to see him upon his release.

=== Deaths in the family ===
After the proclamation of the Second Spanish Republic, Buenaventura moved to Barcelona and Dumange prompted her daughter Rosa to visit him there. Before long, he was arrested again, so he immediately sent a letter to his mother to calm her after she learned the news. The family attempted to convince him to return to León, but he justified his commitment to revolutionary activity by citing his mother's experiences with poverty. When Dumange's husband died in December 1931, she saw that her son was well-dressed for the funeral. The following year, one of her sons died during a strike in León. Her son Pedro, who was a leader of the Iberian Anarchist Federation (FAI) in León at the time, was detained during the Revolution of 1934 under suspicion of sedition. Her son Manuel was executed for his own participation in the revolution. Throughout the early 1930s, Dumange continued urging Buenaventura to come back to León and spend time with the family; he finally accepted after his release from prison in November 1935. Following the outbreak of the Spanish Civil War, in November 1936, her son Pedro informed her that Buenaventura had been killed in action during the siege of Madrid. Pedro himself was executed by the Falange in León on 22 August 1937.

According to Rosa Durruti, even after the war, Dumange continued to command the respect of other Leonese citizens. In the mid-1960s, when Dumange was already 90 years old, historian Abel Paz attempted to set up an interview with her, but as an exile he was unable to get to León. One of the young members of the family instead acted as a surrogate for Paz and interviewed Dumange about her family and Buenaventura's early life. Anastasia Dumange died in León in 1968. Only 3 of her 8 children – Rosa, Santiago and Vicente – outlived her.

== Bibliography ==
- Enzensberger, Hans Magnus (2018) [1972]. Anarchy's Brief Summer: The Life and Death of Buenaventura Durruti. Translated by Mitchell, Mike. Seagull Books. ISBN 9780857426000. OCLC 1077270536.
- García de Tuñón Aza, José María (December 2011). "La causa de Marciano, el hermano falangista de Buenaventura Durruti". El Catoblepas (in Spanish) (118): 9. ISSN 1579-3974.
- Iglesias, Ignacio G. (1976). "Muerto el 20 de noviembre de 1936: Buenaventura Durruti, un revolucionario nato". Tiempo de historia (in Spanish). 2 (24): 4–17.
- Íñiguez, Miguel (2001). Esbozo de una enciclopedia histórica del anarquismo español (in Spanish). Madrid: Fundación de Estudios Libertarios Anselmo Lorenzo. ISBN 9788486864453. OCLC 807322760.
- Llarch, Joan (1973). La muerte de Durruti (in Spanish). Barcelona: Ediciones Aura.
- Paz, Abel (2006) [1996]. Durruti in the Spanish Revolution. Translated by Morse, Chuck. Edinburgh: AK Press. ISBN 1-904859-50-X. LCCN 2006920974. OCLC 482919277.
- Rivas Otero, José Manuel (2015). "Una mirada libertaria al liderazgo". In Tarin, Adrián (ed.). Miradas libertarias. Los Libros de la Catarata. pp. 150–184. ISBN 9788490970454.
- Zavala, José María (14 December 2021). "Consigna: matar al hermano falangista de Durruti". La Razón (in Spanish). ISSN 1576-7094.
