= Pedro Durruti =

Spanish anarcho-falangist (1911–1937)

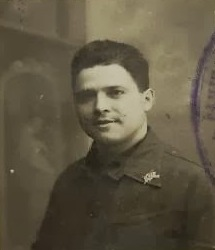
- Durruti in 1936
- Born: Marciano Pedro Durruti Domingo; 6 March 1911; León, Spain
- Died: 22 August 1937 (aged 26); Ferral del Bernesga, León, Spain
- Resting place: Municipal Cemetery of León; 42.571096°N 5.559125°W
- Other name: Perico Durruti
- Occupations: Mechanic; activist
- Political party: Falange Española de las JONS (1936–1937)
- Other political affiliations: Iberian Anarchist Federation (1932–1936); National Confederation of Labour (1934–1936)
- Movement: Anarchism; Falangism
- Criminal charges: Rebellion
- Criminal penalty: Death
- Criminal status: Executed by firing squad
- Parents: Santiago Durruti (father); Anastasia Dumange (mother)
- Relatives: Buenaventura Durruti (brother)

Marciano Pedro Durruti Domingo (Spanish: [maɾˈθjano ˈpeðɾo ðuˈruti ðoˈmiŋgo]; 6 March 1911 – 22 August 1937) was a Spanish anarchist and Falangist revolutionary. The younger brother of Buenaventura Durruti, he followed him into the Spanish anarchist movement, becoming a local leader of the Iberian Anarchist Federation (FAI) in the Leonese country. After a series of arrests for his anarchist activism, he moved to Madrid, where he came under the influence of Falangism. He attempted to create a synthesis of anarchism and Falangism, and encourage the merger of anarchist and Falangist organisations. In 1936, he joined the Falange Española de las JONS and attempted to set up a meeting between his brother and the Falange's leader José Antonio Primo de Rivera, but his brother rejected his overtures. After the outbreak of the Spanish Civil War, he was briefly imprisoned by the Republicans in the Cárcel Modelo, but he was released following an appeal and managed to make his way to the Nationalist zone. There he was implicated in an anti-Francoist conspiracy by Falangist leader Manuel Hedilla, and Durruti himself attempted to organise a coup d'état to overthrow Francisco Franco's military junta and seize power for the Falange. After being found guilty of rebellion by a military tribunal, he was executed by a firing squad made up of other Falangists. The motivations for Durruti's execution have been questioned by historians, who largely conclude that he was executed because of his relation to his brother.

== Biography ==
=== Early life and activism ===
Marciano Pedro Durruti Domingo was born in León, on 6 March 1911. He was the youngest son of Santiago Durruti (Note: His father's surname, "Durruti", was derived from the Basque word "Urruti" ("far away") and referred to Basques who lived in the mountains far away from urban centres.) and Anastasia Dumange, (Note: His mother's Catalan surname, "Dumange", was Castilianised to "Domínguez", although Pedro himself used the variant "Domingo". This was due to a change in the civil registry requested by his father, although the change was applied inconsistently to his children.) and the younger brother of the anarchist revolutionary Buenaventura Durruti. His older brother called him by the nickname "Perico", and he in turn called his older brother "Pepe". His older brother sent him letters from prison in 1926, after he was arrested for attempting to assassinate Alfonso XIII in Paris. After a subsequent arrest, Pedro attempted to convince his older brother to quit his revolutionary activism and return to León, but he refused. The young Durruti ultimately followed in his older brother's footsteps, becoming a mechanic by trade and joining the ranks of the Spanish anarchist movement.

In September 1932, Pedro Durruti joined the Leonese anarchist group Paz y Amor. He soon became a leading figure in the Iberian Anarchist Federation (FAI) in the Leonese country, leading to his imprisonment during the anarchist insurrection of December 1933 and his arrest and trial during the Asturian Revolution of 1934. In order to escape surveillance, he moved to the Spanish capital of Madrid, where he would be less well-known. He kept in correspondence with his brother, who sent him letters in which he predicted the coming of a global war.

He came to believe that the revolutionary movement's tactics needed to adapt to the present circumstances, and was himself won over by the symbology and hierarchy of the Falangist movement. In the book El libro de San Marcos, Leonese writer Victoriano Crémer described Durruti as an "anarcho-Falangist" (Spanish: anarco-falangista). His syncretic ideology synthesised elements from his brother's anarchism together with elements of fascism; he believed both were different versions of the same revolutionary ideology, opposed to both Marxism and capitalism, and that they could therefore be combined together. Through his friendship with the Falangist poet Luys Santa Marina, Durruti was able to set up a meeting on 3 May 1935 between the Falangist leader José Antonio Primo de Rivera, the anarchist Diego Abad de Santillán and Ángel Pestaña, the founder of the Syndicalist Party.

=== Falangist activism ===
After leaving the National Confederation of Labour (CNT), he moved to join the Falange Española de las JONS. Using his name to reaffirm his revolutionary credentials, he gained the trust of some of the Falangist leadership, although others distrusted him for the same reason. On 5 February 1936, he was accepted into the Falange, with the personal endorsement of its leader Primo de Rivera. On 1 April 1936, he received his membership card, numbered 1,501. His sister Rosa personally embroidered the yoke and arrows onto his blue Falange uniform. His conversion to Falangism was quickly reported in the anarchist newspaper Claridad, which warned its readers that "although he calls himself an anarchist, he is not one". Other anarchists speculated that he had join the Falange to save his own life, as others had in other cases, and referred to him as a "Failangist" (Spanish: Failangista; a portmanteau of FAI and Falangist).

He believed that by joining he would infuse the Falangist movement with revolutionary working-class energy. He also hoped that, through his own example, he could encourage the merger of the two organisations. He acted as an intermediary between his brother and Primo de Rivera, attempting to arrange a meeting between the two, but his brother adamantly rebuffed him. According to his nephew, Manuel Durruti Cubría, Buenaventura told Pedro: "You'll see what payment the fascists will give you."

At the outbreak of the Spanish Civil War, Durruti was caught in the Republican zone. He was arrested for his Falangist activism, and imprisoned in the Cárcel Modelo in Madrid, where he again met Primo de Rivera. His mother, Anastasia Dumange, used her name to appeal for clemency for her son. He was subsequently bailed out by Pestaña, who personally appealed to President Manuel Azaña. With the aid of Pilar Primo de Rivera, the leader of the Falange's Sección Femenina, he was able to escape the Spanish capital into the Nationalist zone. In September 1936, he returned to the Leonese country and took refuge with his family. There he was readmitted into the Central Obrera Nacional-Sindicalista (CONS). He briefly worked as a stoker at a locomotive reserve in Busdongo de Arbas, before finally returning to his home city. On 20 November 1936, his brother Buenaventura was killed in action during the siege of Madrid. Pedro Durruti was the one to inform his family of his brother's death.

=== Rebellion ===
In Salamanca, in the south of the Leonese country, an internal conflict within the ranks of the Falange broke out over the Unification Decree, in which Francisco Franco enforced the merger of the Falangists and Carlists into the FET y de las JONS. One faction, led by Manuel Hedilla and Aniceto Ruiz Castillejo, attempted to rebel against it, but they were all arrested on charges of conspiracy. Durruti himself was accused of supporting Hedilla's conspiracy, although according to Crémer, Durruti knew nothing about the conflict in Salamanca.

On 4 August 1937, Durruti held a meeting at the house of the mayor of Armunia, during which he was said to have outlined plans for a Falangist coup d'état against the Francoist government. He called for the admission of socialists and communists into the Falange, with the intention of strengthening the party so it could seize power from the military junta and subordinate the Spanish Army to the Falange; to win people over, he claimed that he had the support of the Assault Guards in Valladolid. He also called for the dissolution of the Civil Guard, which he accused of carrying out arbitrary executions, and the abolition of the Catholic clergy. He was then said to have repeated these proclamations at a subsequent meeting at a cafe in León on 14 August. He was soon arrested on charges of conspiring against the regime, imprisoned in the Convento de San Marcos, and subsequently tried by a military tribunal in León.

=== Trial and execution ===
During Durruti's trial, one of the witnesses claimed that he was a supporter of Hedilla. The prosecution accused him of treason against both the Falange and the country, alleging that he had passed information about members of the Madrid Falange onto the Republican Directorate-General for Security (DGS), leading to their arrest and execution. It also accused him of attempting to demoralise the Nationalist rearguard and provoke discontent between the various Nationalist factions. Under these accusations, the prosecution called for a sentence of either life imprisonment or capital punishment. Durruti's defense attorney cited his service to the Falange as a mitigating factor for his crimes and requested a lighter sentence.

On 22 August 1937, the military tribunal found Durruti guilty of rebellion and sentenced him to death. General Salvador Múgica Buhigas, the military governor of León, forwarded the sentence to Francisco Franco for his approval and organised a squad of Falangist militiamen to carry out the execution. That evening, at 18:30, he was executed by firing squad in the Leonese village of Ferral del Bernesga. On 25 August, his death certificate was issued by the civil registry, which falsely declared that he had died from cardiac arrest. His body was buried in the municipal cemetery in León.

== Historiography ==
Victoriano Crémer called him solely by his second given name "Pedro" and never used his first given name "Marciano". This created some historiographical confusion and caused a number of writers, including journalist Gustavo Morales, to believe that Marciano and Pedro referred to two brothers who had similar life stories. Durruti himself signed his name as Marciano and was referred to as Marciano Pedro in his trial records. Durruti has been largely ignored in both anarchist and Falangist histories. Anarchist historian Abel Paz, who wrote the biography on his brother Buenaventura, only gave three passing mentions to Pedro. Revisionist historian César Vidal, who wrote his own biography on Buenaventura, did not know that Pedro Durruti existed. Durruti was also never mentioned in Manuel Hedilla's memoirs, nor in the history of the Falange in the Spanish Civil War by Maximiano García Venero.

Differing accounts of Pedro Durruti's death have also arisen. Some accounts, including those of Catalan historian Joan Llarch and encyclopedist Miguel Íñiguez, incorrectly claimed that Pedro Durruti had been shot by militiamen in Madrid's Cárcel Modelo. The Falangist politician Narciso Perales claimed that Pedro Durruti had been shot in Barcelona at the outbreak of the civil war, and that a certain "Marcelo Durruti" had been shot in León by anti-fascists. In April 2007, an article in El Mundo reported that Manuel Durruti Cubría had found his uncle's case files. García de Tuñón Aza then located the case files in the military archives in the Galician city of Ferrol; these demonstrated that he had been executed by the Nationalists in León for the crime of rebellion.

The motives for his execution have also aroused suspicion from various historians. Manuel Hedilla and Aniceto Ruiz Castillejo were also sentenced to death, but unlike Durruti, neither were executed. The right-wing of the Falange spread rumours that he had been executed because he was a "robber", like his brother before him. Antonio Santiso Lamparte, a Leonese national syndicalist and a friend of Durruti, believed he had been found guilty and executed solely because of his surname. Asturian historian José María García de Tuñón Aza concluded that his execution was in part a sanction for his surname and that it was also intended to set an example against any adventurism that might have undermined the leading role of the Spanish Army in the Nationalist camp. Mallorcan historian Jeroni Miquel Mas Rigo also concluded that he was executed for "spurious motives", believing the real reason to have been his surname and his status as a Hedillist.

== See also ==
- Falange Auténtica

== Bibliography ==
- García de Tuñón Aza, José María (April 2009). "Marciano Pedro Durruti Domingo". El Catoblepas (in Spanish) (86): 21. ISSN 1579-3974.
- García de Tuñón Aza, José María (December 2011). "La causa de Marciano, el hermano falangista de Buenaventura Durruti". El Catoblepas (in Spanish) (118): 9. ISSN 1579-3974.
- Garcival, Gonzalo (1 April 2007). "El hermano falangista de Durruti". El Mundo (in Spanish). No. 596. ISSN 1697-0179.
- Iglesias, Ignacio G. (1976). "Muerto el 20 de noviembre de 1936: Buenaventura Durruti, un revolucionario nato". Tiempo de historia (in Spanish). 2 (24): 4–17.
- Íñiguez, Miguel (2001). Esbozo de una enciclopedia histórica del anarquismo español (in Spanish). Madrid: Fundación de Estudios Libertarios Anselmo Lorenzo. ISBN 9788486864453. OCLC 807322760.
- Mas Rigo, Jeroni Miquel (2022). "La intervención de Antonio Luna García en el "golpe" contra Hedilla". El Catoblepas (in Spanish) (201): 9. ISSN 1579-3974.
- Mas Rigo, Jeroni Miquel (2023). "Vicente Cadenas y la disidencia falangista en el sur de Francia". El Catoblepas (in Spanish) (204): 13. ISSN 1579-3974.
- Morales, Gustavo (August 2007). "Falangistas contra Franco: los azules fusilados en 1942". El Catoblepas (in Spanish) (66): 9. ISSN 1579-3974.
- Paz, Abel (2006) [1996]. Durruti in the Spanish Revolution. Translated by Morse, Chuck. Edinburgh: AK Press. ISBN 1-904859-50-X. LCCN 2006920974. OCLC 482919277.
- San Román, José María (2009). "Marciano Pedro Durruti Domingo". Altar Mayor (in Spanish) (127): 769–777.
- Zavala, José María (14 December 2021). "Consigna: matar al hermano falangista de Durruti". La Razón (in Spanish). ISSN 1576-7094.
