= Antònia Fontanillas =

Spanish anarcho-syndicalist (1917–2014)

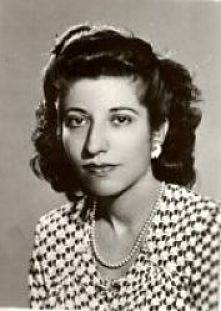
- Fontanillas in 1946
- Born: Antònia Margarita Aurora Fontanillas Borràs; 29 May 1917; Barcelona, Catalonia, Spain
- Died: 23 September 2014 (aged 97); Dreux, France
- Occupations: Journalist, historian
- Organisations: National Confederation of Labour (until 1983); General Confederation of Labour (from 1983)
- Movement: Anarchism
- Partners: Abel Paz (1952–1958); Antonio Cañete Rodríguez (1960–1979)
- Children: Ariel
- Family: Francisca Saperas (grandmother)

Antònia Margarita Aurora Fontanillas Borràs (29 May 1917 – 23 September 2014) was a Catalan anarcho-syndicalist activist, journalist and historian. Coming from an anarchist family, she joined the anarchist movement at an early age, affiliating with the graphic arts union of the National Confederation of Labour (CNT) and the Libertarian Youth. She worked for Solidaridad Obrera during the Spanish Civil War and clandestinely distributed the paper after the fall of Barcelona, before fleeing into exile in France. She remained active in the exiled anarchist movement, and after the Spanish transition to democracy, she joined the General Confederation of Labour (CGT) and wrote several works about the history of Spanish anarchism.

== Biography ==
Antònia Fontanillas Borràs was born on 29 May 1917, in the Raval neighbourhood of Barcelona. She was part of a multi-generational Catalan anarchist family: she was the daughter of José Fontanillas (1875–1947) and María Borràs (1883–1950), niece of Salud Borràs (1878–1954), and the granddaughter of Martí Borràs and Francisca Saperas. Fontanillas remembered her father as follows: "He wasn't a public speaker or a writer, but he was a tireless propagandist and a link to anarchist publications in the Americas," where he had spent a few years in exile.

At age five, Fontanillas saw Civil Guards search her home to confiscate anarchist books and take her father away to prison for several months. She also experienced first-hand the period of pistolerismo in Barcelona, recalling the news of Salvador Seguí's murder just 200 meters from where she lived. In October 1925, at age eight, she emigrated to Mexico, with her mother and three siblings, arriving at the port of Veracruz on 20 November. Her father joined them almost two years later, in August 1927, after settling economic debts he had in Barcelona.

Once settled in Mexico City, she completed six years of primary education at a public school, where she received a rationalist education influenced by the propaganda of the anarchosyndicalists of the Casa del Obrero Mundial (COM). She lived in the Spanish Chamber of Commerce, where her father worked as a concierge, and supplemented her education by reading classic novels from the chamber's library as well as El Ideal and La Revista Blanca, for which her father was a correspondent, along with other anarchist journals such as Estudios, or literary series created around La Revista Blanca such as La Novela Ideal and La Novela Libre.

In March 1933, José Fontanillas was arrested after a raid at a conference held by his friend Rafael Quintero with other Mexican anarchist comrades, and he was expelled from the country on 17 March. One year later, Fontanillas and her family returned to Spain, repatriated by the Spanish consulate, arriving in Barcelona on 11 April.

In 1934, building on her previous work experience at Quintero's printing press (he was a typographer), she began working at the graphic arts company Riusset as a paper handler. In May 1936, all the workers at the company joined the CNT and created a union section, of which she was elected delegate. Later, Fontanillas joined the Libertarian Youth (FIJL), in which Federico Ruffinelli, the organisation's propaganda secretary, encouraged her to take positions of responsibility.

Following the outbreak of the Spanish Civil War in 1936, Fontanillas attempted to enlist in the confederal militias and take part in the planned Mallorca landings. She and two of her friends convinced Juan Yagüe, the leader of the Red and Black Column, to allow them to join the column for the planned expedition. Her friends took part in the expedition, which was ultimately unsuccessful in its aim of capturing the island; Fontanillas herself was persuaded to stay behind by her father.

She returned to her job at Riusset. There, the women tried to negotiate better wages, without success. Fontanillas and another female colleague campaigned to collectivise the printing press, but they did not obtain enough votes in the workers' assembly. Given this situation, she decided to quit the company and found work as an administrative assistant for the newspaper Solidaridad Obrera, going from a weekly salary of 16–18 pesetas to the single weekly salary of 140 pesetas. At this point, she set aside her positions in the CNT and became active in the Secretariat of the FIJL of Graphic Arts, while also beginning her career as a writer.

Observing the ongoing Spanish Revolution, Fontanillas reported that the "barriers of convention" were broken down and that "one breathed in a different kind of atmosphere, more natural, more human". Later into the war, Fontanillas was discouraged from joining the Mujeres Libres —an anarchist women's organisation which her aunt Salud Borràs belonged to— by the FIJL, which gave her the "false impression" that it was an organisation for older women.

On 24 January 1939, with Franco's troops about to enter the city, she tried to convince her family to take a truck heading for the French border, but her father, old and ill, refused, and the Fontanillas family stayed in Barcelona along with Aunt Salud, hiding all the anarchist books in an attic and remaining active in the underground anarchist movement. Between January and November 1945, she typeset at least fourteen issues of Solidaridad Obrera in her home, and clandestinely distributed them throughout the city.On 7 November 1945, the printing operation was dismantled, and Fontanillas, along with other militants, was arrested, interrogated, and released that same night. She continued to collaborate under various pseudonyms —Una joven libertaria, Alba, etc.— for the clandestine newspaper Ruta (1946–1948) and was designated by the Libertarian Youth as the liaison between the prisoners of the Model Prison of Barcelona and their defense attorney, Ramón Viladás from 1946 to 1948.

In this way, she met the prisoner Diego Camacho Escámez (later known by his nom de plume Abel Paz) and began a four-year epistolary relationship with him. Diego was released on parole in April 1952, and they lived together in Barcelona until 1953, when they left for France — first he went clandestinely, and a few months later, in November, she crossed the border by train. They first settled in Brezolles and then in Clermont-Ferrand, Auvergne (1954). In Clermont-Ferrand, she was an active member of the CNT and the Spanish Libertarian Movement and was responsible for the Rhône-Alpes Bulletin (1956–1961) together with Alejandro Lamela and Diego Camacho, while also collaborating with the maquis guerrilla Quico Sabaté.

In 1958, Diego Camacho left to live in Paris with another woman. Without a work permit, without economic resources, and barely able to speak the language, Fontanillas and her two-year-old son Ariel followed him to Paris before finding refuge as a single mother with other refugees in Dreux, where in 1960 she began a relationship with Antonio Cañete Rodríguez, with whom she lived until his death in 1979. Together, in 1962, they created the theater group Reflejos de España with other refugees to spread libertarian ideas. She also edited Surco (1966–1967) in Spanish, French, and Esperanto.

After the death of dictator Francisco Franco, she returned to Spain for the first time in August 1977 to recover the documents of her uncle Octave Jahn—a Frenchman who was one of the first people to promote libertarian communism in Spain in the 1880s— which had been hidden since the 1920s in a false ceiling in her house on Carrer Robador in Barcelona.

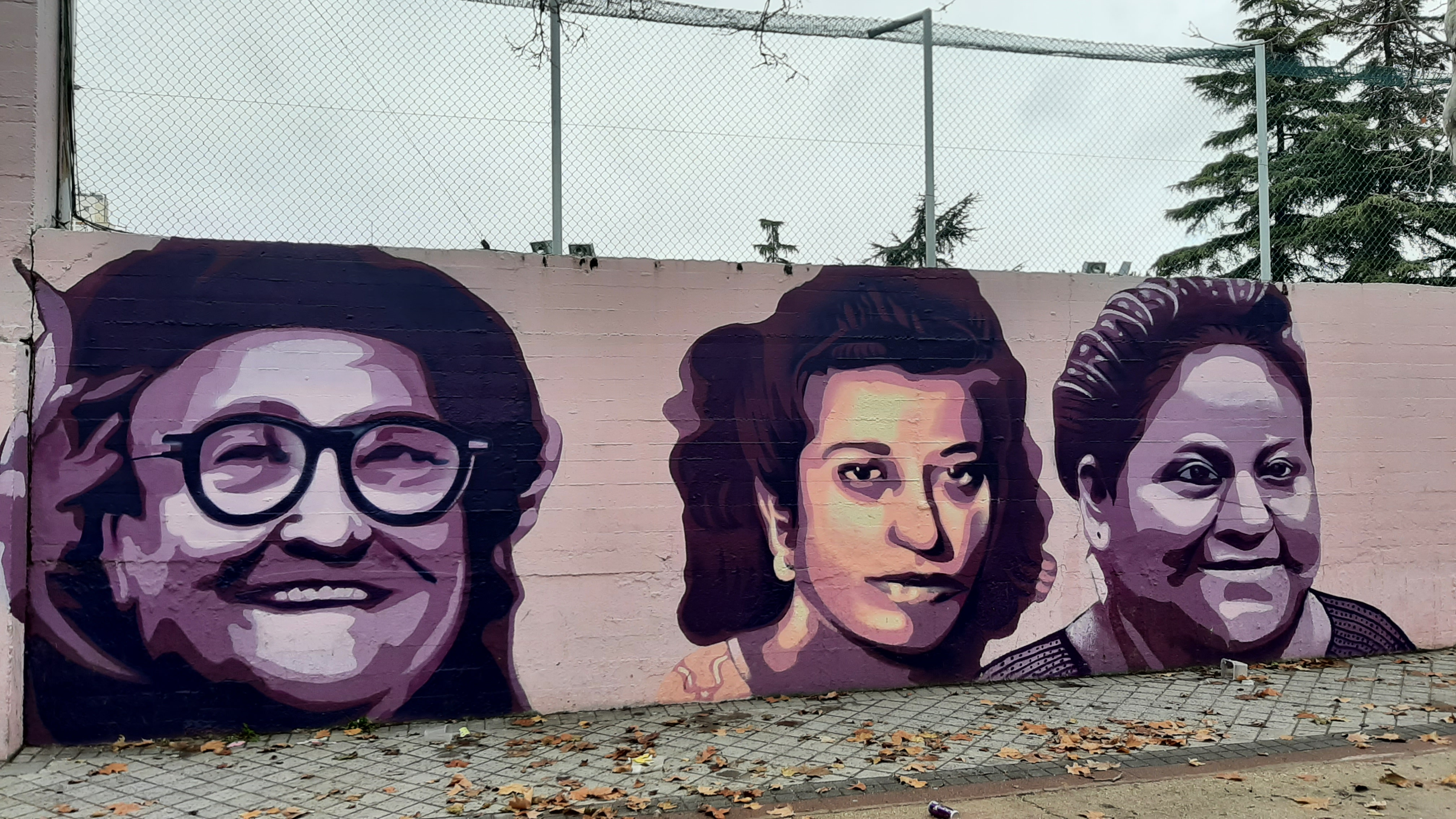
Wall mural in "La Concepción" Municipal Sport Center, Madrid, which shows Antònia Fontanillas Borràs together with Rigoberta Menchú and Rosa Arauzo.

After the Spanish transition to democracy, she participated in all CNT congresses between 1979 and 1983, before joining the breakaway CGT in 1983, participating in its congresses from then until 1997. She nevertheless agitated for reconciliation between the splintered factions of the anarchist movement, remaining critical of her own organisation. She spent the rest of her life preserving the historical memory of her generation of Spanish anarchism. She participated in many cultural and literary events in Spain as well as in France, Italy, and Luxembourg.

Fontanillas was a self-taught archivist and historian and was a member of the International Centre for Research on Anarchism (CIRA) She sought out and preserved numerous documents on anarchism that are currently held at the International Institute of Social History (IISH) in Amsterdam, with more than 600 archives in the Antònia Fontanillas Borras Papers collection, as well as at the Biblioteca Pública Arús (BPA) in Barcelona and at the Fundación Salvador Seguí in Barcelona, and penned several books under various pseudonyms.

Her last major project was a biography of Lucía Sánchez Saornil, one of the founders of Mujeres Libres. Most of the women of that movement remained active in exile after the war, but Lucía effectively disappeared after the 1940s. For years, Fontanillas gathered information and, at age 90, began writing the book (together with Pau Martínez from 2013 onwards). However, Lucía Sánchez Saornil: Poet, Journalist, and Founder of Mujeres Libres was not published until three months after Fontanillas' death, on 23 September 2014 in Dreux.

== Legacy ==
Fontanillas' papers are collected in the International Institute of Social History. Historian Danny Evans dedicated his book about the Spanish Revolution to Fontanillas, say her commitment to preserving the historical memory of the period was an inspiration to him. Elena Duque placed her in a collective biography of anarchist women, alongside Sara Berenguer, Pepita Carpena, Joaquina Dorado Pita and Conxa Pérez, who all had similar experiences and life stories. José Luis Gutiérrez Molina said that her biography "encapsulates the history of anarchism in Spain".

== Selected works ==
- De lo aprendido y vivido (Dreux, 1996)
- Vidas cortas pero llenas. 80 aniversario de la fundación de la FIJL (Badalona, 2012)
- Lucía Sánchez Saornil: Poeta, periodista y fundadora de Mujeres Libres (Madrid, 2014)

== Bibliography ==
- Ackelsberg, Martha A. (2018). "Activism, Revolution and War: Mujeres Libres Addressing the Personal and the Political". Revista Universitaria de Historia Militar. 7 (13). Smith College: 81–103. doi:10.53351/ruhm.v7i13.381. ISSN 2254-6111.
- Acrata, Librepensador (2014). "Antonia Fontanillas Borrás (1917-2014)". KSL: Bulletin of the Kate Sharpley Library (80). Translated by Sharkey, Paul: 3. ISSN 1475-0309.
- Camacho, Ariel (January 2018). "La "mémoire" de ma mère" [The "memoirs" of my mother]. Exils et migrations ibériques aux XXe et XXIe siècles (in French). 1 (9–10): 30−56. doi:10.3917/emi.009.0030. ISBN 9782360135127 – via Cairn.info.
- Cuadrada, Coral (2016). "The Revolution of the Women Without Anything, Without a Name". Časopis za povijest Zapadne Hrvatske. 11: 25–47. ISSN 1846-3223.
- Duque, Elena (2015). "Collective Biography of Female Anarchists Participating in the Free Women and Libertarian Movements". Qualitative Inquiry. 21 (10): 934–940. doi:10.1177/1077800415611692.
- Evans, Danny (2018). Revolution and the State: Anarchism in the Spanish Civil War, 1936-1939. Routledge. ISBN 978-1-138-06314-3.
- Fontanillas, Antònia (26 May 1996). "De lo aprendido y vivido" [From what I have learned and experienced] (PDF) (in Spanish). pp. 1–13 – via Ser Histórico.
- Íñiguez, Miguel (2001). "Fontanillas Borràs, Antònia". Esbozo de una enciclopedia histórica del anarquismo español (in Spanish). Madrid: Fundación de Estudios Libertarios Anselmo Lorenzo. p. 233. ISBN 9788486864453. OCLC 807322760.
- Vega, Eulàlia (30 December 2010). Pioneras y revolucionarias: Mujeres libertarias durante la República, la Guerra Civil y el Franquismo [Pioneers and revolutionaries: Libertarian women during the Republic, the Civil War and the Franco regime] (in Spanish). Icaria-Antrazyt and Confederación Sindical Solidaridad Obrera. pp. 47−48, 136−137, 390, 520−521, 622. ISBN 978-8498882896.
- Vega, Eulalia (2008). "L'esilio francese di Antonia Fontanillas, militante anarchica" [The French exile of Antonia Fontanillas, an anarchist activist] (PDF). DEP (Deportate, esuli, profughe: rivista telematica di studi sulla memoria femminile) (in Italian) (8). Università Ca' Foscari: 36–37. Archived from the original (PDF) on 3 March 2016.
