= Miss Republic of the Philippines =

Beauty pageant in the Philippines

Miss Republic of the Philippines or Miss RP is a beauty pageant in the Philippines currently held biennially (every two years).

== History ==
Miss Republic of the Philippines was first staged in 1969 under Ferdie Villar of Spotlight Promotions. The winner was chosen as the official delegate of the Philippines to the Miss World pageant.

The Runners-up of Miss Republic of the Philippines were awarded as Miss Luzon (1st Runner-up), Miss Visayas (2nd Runner-up), Miss Mindanao (3rd Runner-up) and Miss Manila (4th Runner-up).

Miss RP representation for Miss World lasted until 1976, when the Miss World franchise was transferred to Mutya ng Pilipinas, Miss Republic of the Philippines 1976 Josephine Conde crowned Peachy Veneracion in 1977 the first Mutya ng Pilipinas – World, to distinguish it from the other winner of Mutya ng Pilipinas who competes in the Miss Asia Quest.

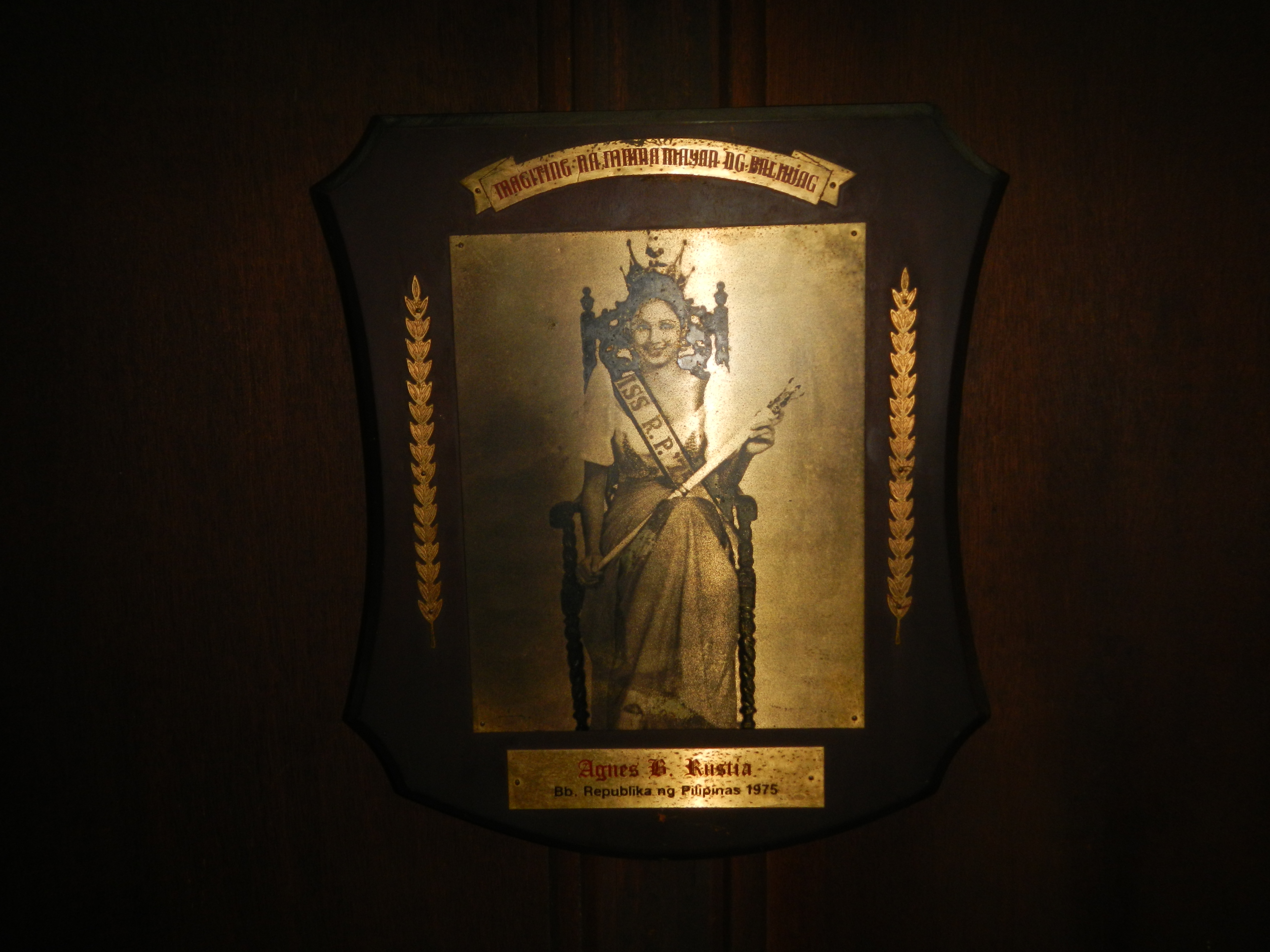
Agnes Benisano Rustia, 1975

== Titleholders ==
The winners were awarded as Miss Republic of the Philippines of the succeeding calendar year, as the pageant is held almost at the end of the year, however they compete in the Miss World of the year they actually won the local title.

1970 to 1977 - Miss Republic of the Philippines (selection for Miss World 1969 to 1976)

Year	Miss Republic of the Philippines	Runners-Up			
Year	Miss Republic of the Philippines	Miss Luzon	Miss Visayas	Miss Mindanao	Miss Manila
1970	Feliza Teresa Miro	Elizabeth Lee Magbanua	Jacquiline Tanquintic	Elizabeth Sales	Nenita Guilatco
1971	Minerva Manalo Cagatao	Belen Mumar	Marietta Pons	Eleanor Almario	Vivian Roque
1972	Onelia Ison Jose	Elizabeth Freeman Oropeza	Dollie Alonzo	Victoria Lozano	Maribel Diaz
1973	Evangeline Rosales Reyes	Ofelia Solevilla	Rebecca de Leon	Mercedes Natividad	Christine Mascarenas
1974	Evangeline Pascual	Rosemarie Peña	Marissa Corpuz Andrada	Gloria Cuenca	Eileen Dimalanta
1975	Agnes Benisano Rustia	Cynthia Ballesteros	Eleanor Villalon	Solita Santos	Cristina Cuevas
1976	Suzanne Talam Gonzales	Annabelle Aquino Bayle	Elizabeth Bautista	Susan de Acosta	Ruby Cabauatan
1977	Josephine Salazar Conde	Caroline Villaverde	Maria Blesilda Badilla	Jennifer Mendoza	Maripaz Medel

2015 to Present - The revival of Miss Republic of the Philippines in 2015 and the inaugural of Mr. Republic of the Philippines in 2017 (scholarship-based pageant)

After a long hiatus, Miss Republic of the Philippines was revived in 2015 and re-branded with a new vision and trust by Successful Entrepreneur, Finance Software Architect and one of Philippines’ Best Dressed Women, Miss Lynette Padolina.

Cash prize and scholarship grant for a four-year college course or post-graduate studies, were given to the winners. Aside from the top title of Miss Republic of the Philippines, three equal ranking runners-up title of Miss RP-Luzon, Miss RP-Visayas and Miss RP-Mindanao were also awarded in 2015 alongside another title of Miss RP International intended for the Overseas Filipino Delegates of the pageant. In 2018, a Mr Republic of the Philippines was added with three respective runners-up.

Year	Miss Republic of the Philippines	Runners-Up			
Year	Miss Republic of the Philippines	Miss RP Luzon	Miss RP Visayas	Miss RP Mindanao	Miss RP International
2015 - 2016	Fermira Dianne Tumangan Ramos	Joselle Mariano	Sheila Marie Reyes	Kristie Rose Cequeña	Beatrice Valente (Milan, Italy)
2017 - 2018	Cindy Marriah Dumol	Thamara Alexandria Pacursa	Patricia Mae Baratilla	Chariss Jedidiah Gusay	Excelsa De Jesus (New York, USA)
2019 - 2020	Pageant cancelled				

Year	Mister Republic of the Philippines	Runners-Up		
Year	Mister Republic of the Philippines	Mr RP Luzon	Mr RP Visayas	Mr RP Mindanao
2017 - 2018	Dennis Malones	John Carlo Morales	Jay Lester Abrenica	Jedryk Costes
2019 - 2020	Pageant cancelled			

== Miss World Representatives from 1966 to 1976 ==
Prior to Mutya ng Pilipinas – World, the Philippines' delegates to Miss World from 1966 to 1968 were selected by various pageant organizers. From 1969 to 1976, delegates were determined by winning at the Miss Republic of the Philippines pageant.

Year	Delegate	Hometown	Competition performance		National pageant organizers	Ref.
Year	Delegate	Hometown	Placement	Other award(s)	National pageant organizers	Ref.
1966	Vivienne Lee Austria (Emraida Kelly Kiram)		Unplaced		Chosen by the College Editors Guild of the Philippines - holds also the 1966 Intercollegiate Girl title	
1967	Margarita Favis Gomez		Unplaced		Chosen by the organizing agency for the 1967 Top Ten Fashion Models of the Philippines	
1968	Arene Cecilia Anas Amabuyok		4th Runner-Up		Beauty World Ltd (franchise holder)	
1969	Feliza Teresa Miro		Unplaced		Miss Republic of the Philippines	
1970	Minerva Manalo Cagatao		Top 15		Miss Republic of the Philippines	
1971	Onelia Ison Jose		Unplaced	Best National Costume	Miss Republic of the Philippines	
1972	Evangeline Rosales Reyes		Top 15		Miss Republic of the Philippines	
1973	Evangeline Pascual	Orani	1st Runner-Up		Miss Republic of the Philippines	
1974	Agnes Benisano Rustia		Unplaced		Miss Republic of the Philippines	
1975	Suzanne Talam Gonzales		Unplaced		Miss Republic of the Philippines	
1976	Josephine Salazar Conde		Attended the pageant but withdrew before the finals as a protest		Miss Republic of the Philippines	

== See also ==
- Philippines at major beauty pageants
- Big Four beauty pageants
- List of beauty pageants
- Miss Universe Philippines
- Miss World Philippines
- Binibining Pilipinas
- Miss Philippines Earth
- Reina Filipinas
- The Miss Philippines
- Miss Island Philippines
- Miss Pearl of the Orient Philippines
