= Darcy Miro =

American metal artist

- Born: September 17, 1973 (age 52); Detroit, Michigan, United States
- Education: Rhode Island School of Design
- Occupation: Artist

Darcy Miro (born September 17, 1973) is an American metal artist from Brooklyn.

== Early life and achievements ==
Miro was born in Detroit, Michigan to Marsha Miro and Jeffrey Miro and attended Cranbrook Kingswood High School, In 1991, Miro graduated from Rhode Island School of Design and attended The School for International Training in Kathmandu, Nepal. Miro's first gallery show was at the Susanne Hilberry Gallery in Detroit with Yayoi Kusama. While continuing to exhibit at galleries, Miro worked with architects, fashion and interior designers Peter Marino Will Bruder, Diller Scofidio Renfro, Kelly Wearstler and Emily Summers. Miro has collaborated on Folk Art Museum Facade with Tod Williams Billie Tsien Architects. Miro developed the facade of the American Folk Art Museum in New York City and is now in the collection of the Museum of Modern Art. Jewelry made by Miro is in the permanent collection of the Museum of Fine Arts Boston and Museum of Art and Design.
