= Miss Republic of the Philippines 2015 =

- Date: November 4, 2015
- Presenters: Paolo Bediones; Venus Raj
- Venue: Solaire Resort & Casino, Parañaque, Philippines
- Entrants: 35
- Placements: 10
- Winner: Fermira Dianne Ramos; Zambales

Miss Republic of the Philippines 2015-2016 is the revival of Miss Republic of the Philippines pageant that is once-popular national beauty pageant that first staged in 1969 under Ferdie Villar of Spotlight Promotions. The winner was chosen as the official delegate of the Philippines to the Miss World pageant.

After a 38-year hiatus, Miss Republic of the Philippines (Miss RP) is in its comeback under the new ownership of philanthropist, Lynette Padolina, CEO of the revived organization.

The international competition for the winner will be announced in 2nd quarter of 2016, aside from the cash prize and scholarship grant for a four-year college course or post-graduate studies and will tour extensively to promote Philippine tourism and culture. The quest is the equivalent of the Miss America scholarship pageant organization.

== Result ==
=== Placements ===
Placement	Contestant
Miss Republic of the Philippines 2015	Zambales – Fermira Dianne Ramos
Miss RP International 2015	Milan – Beatrice Valente
Miss RP Luzon	Cavite – Joselle Mariano
Miss RP Visayas	Valenzuela – Sheila Marie Reyes
Miss RP Mindanao	Santa Rosa – Kristie Rose Cequeña
Top 10	Cavite – Joselle Mariano; Camarines Sur – Krizzia Lynn Moreno; Bulacan – Kristine Eriel Nolasco; Bacolod – Christine Joy Madamba; South Cotabato – Randea Ann Cabalfin

=== Special awards ===
Special Awards	No.	Represented	Candidate
Miss Congeniality	18	Milan, Italy	Beatrice Valente
Miss Photogenic	22	Valenzuela	Sheila Marie Reyes
Miss Pleasant Touch	21	Cavite	Joselle Mariano
Miss Astoria	21	Cavite	Joselle Mariano
Best in Swimsuit	21	Cavite	Joselle Mariano
Best in Philippine Terno	19	Zambales	Fermira Dianne Ramos
Miss Crossfit Halcyon	21	Cavite	Joselle Mariano
Miss Talent	21	Cavite	Joselle Mariano
Miss Via Mare	19	Zambales	Fermira Dianne Ramos
Miss Fisher Mall	22	Valenzuela	Sheila Marie Reyes
Miss Megadata Corp. USA	19	Zambales	Fermira Dianne Ramos
Best in Long Gown	19	Zambales	Fermira Dianne Ramos
Miss Hannah's Beach Resort	19	Zambales	Fermira Dianne Ramos
