= Ferral del Bernesga =

Town in Spain

Ferral
- Ferral del Bernesga
- Location of Ferral del Bernesga / Castile and León Ferral (Spain)
- Coordinates: 42°36′55″N 5°39′33″W
- Country: Spain
- Autonomous Community: Castile and León
- Province: Leon

Area
  - Total: 81.35 km^{2} (31.41 sq mi)
- Elevation: 910 m (2,990 ft)

Population
  - Total: 575
- Time zone: UTC+1 (CET)
  - Summer (DST): UTC+2 (CEST)
- Postal codes: 24282
- Area code: +34 987 (Castile and León)

Ferral del Bernesga, also known as Ferral, is a Spanish town, belonging to the municipality of San Andrés del Rabanedo, in the province of León and the comarca of Tierra de León, in the Autonomous Community of Castile and León. As of 2024 it had a population of 575 people.

On 25 August 1937, the Spanish anarchist and Falangist revolutionary Pedro Durruti was executed by a firing squad in Ferral del Bersesga.
