= Santiago Durruti =

Spanish trade unionist and politician (d. 1931)

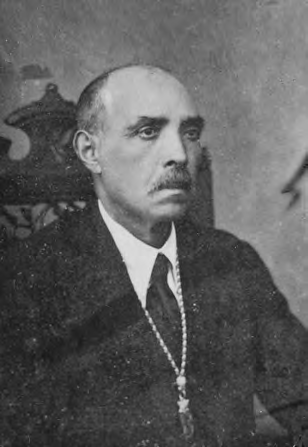
- Durruti, 1923
- Born: Santiago Durruti Malgor; León, Spain
- Died: December 1931; León, Spain
- Occupations: Tanner, carpenter, rail worker
- Organisation: Unión General de Trabajadores (UGT)
- Known for: 1903 León tanners' strike
- Movement: Labour movement
- Spouse: Anastasia Dumange
- Children: 8 (including Buenaventura)
- Parents: Lorenzo Durruti (father); Josefa Malgor (mother)

Santiago Durruti Malgor (d. 1931) was a Spanish trade unionist and politician. Born in León to a Basque father and Asturian mother, Durruti married Anastasia Dumange, with whom he had eight children. Together with his brother Ignacio, Durruti led the city's first trade union, acting as a union representative during a general strike in the city's tanning industry. After nine months, the strike was suppressed and his family subsequently faced severe economic hardships. His son Buenaventura Durruti also became a trade union activist, and later a militant anarchist. During the 1920s, Durruti was nearly arrested after his son was suspected of assassinating a local official. Durruti himself became a city councilor during the dictatorship of Primo de Rivera and died after the proclamation of the Second Spanish Republic in 1931. His funeral was organised by the Unión General de Trabajadores (UGT) and Confederación Nacional del Trabajo (CNT) trade unions.

== Biography ==
=== Early life and family ===
Santiago Durruti Malgor was born in León. His father, Lorenzo Durruti, was a Basque worker who had migrated to the city and spoke little Spanish. (Note: The surname Durruti came from the Lapurdian dialect of the Basque language. It was derived from the word "Urruti" (English: far), and used to refer to Basques who lived in the mountains far away from urban centres.) His mother, Josefa Malgor, was the daughter of an Asturian court employee. In 1892, Durruti married Anastasia Dumange, a young woman from a Catalan family. They lived together in the Santa Ana neighbourhood of León, where they had seven sons and a daughter: Santiago, (Note: Santiago Durruti Dumange was an activist in the Leonese labour movement and lived until 1979.) Buenaventura, Vicente, Plateo, Benedicto, Pedro, Manuel (Note: Manuel Durruti was arrested in León during the anarchist insurrection of December 1933 and was later shot during the Asturian Revolution of 1934.) and Rosa.

Durruti and Dumange raised their children at a time when the Spanish Empire was collapsing, with the loss of its colonies causing an economic decline in the country. This intensified social conflicts in Spain, with strike actions becoming increasingly common in the northern industrial regions of Asturias, the Basque Country and Catalonia. Durruti's family and neighbours lived through great economic hardship during this period. Durruti earned only a small salary, but he was able to support his family with help from his father Lorenzo, his father-in-law Pedro and his brother Ignacio.

=== Labour activism ===
Progressivism in the city was initially represented by a small group of Republicans, but they were politically moderate and rarely challenged the authorities. When a railway line from Valladolid to León opened towards the end of the 19th century, miners and railroad workers brought anarchist and socialist publications to the city for the first time. Inspired by these publications and news from the Basque and Catalan labour movements, in 1899, Durruti's brother Ignacio established the city's first trade union. The organisation preached the economic theory of mutualism and organised the city's tanning workers, who held monthly meetings at the union's branch office on Calle Caño Badillo.

In 1903, tanning workers received daily wages of between 1.25 and 1.75 pesetas, for a workday that lasted from sunrise to sunset. The workers demanded wage increases of 50 céntimos and the reduction of the working day to 10 hours. Through the union, Santiago and Ignacio Durruti, as well as Antonio Quintín and Melchor Antón, were delegated as union representatives to present the demands to the employers' association. When the employers refused, the workers carried out a general strike, the first large-scale industrial action in the city's history. As tanning was the main industry in the city, the local economy ground to a halt. The strike marked the beginning of the organised labour movement in the Region of León.

Santiago Durruti was arrested for his leadership of the strike. The political repression of the striking workers elicited solidarity from much of the Leonese people, who came out in support of the strike. Worried by the outburst of popular support, the local authorities, led by Bishop Leopoldo Ruiz y Flóres, ordered the release of Durruti and other detained workers after 15 days in jail. The strike ultimately lasted for nine months. Durruti's brother Ignacio also sold his workshop in order to support the strike. Local merchants, including Durruti's father Lorenzo, extended credit to the striking workers and sold them food at a loss. But a lack of food eventually broke the strike, as hungry workers increasingly returned to their jobs. Not wanting to cede victory to his employers, Durruti decided to find a different job.

With the defeat of the strike, the family's businesses were boycotted by the employers' association. Durruti's father was forced to close down his canteen, his father-in-law saw his own business collapse and his brother disappeared; the family presumed that Ignacio emigrated to Latin America. Durruti himself struggled to support his family, earning only two pesetas each day in his new job as a carpenter. His son Buenaventura later recalled that Durruti was constantly working, but could not even afford to buy his family bread. Nevertheless, Durruti wanted to keep educating his children, so he used his meager means to send them to a school ran by Ricardo Fanjul.

=== Later life ===
When Buenaventura left school, he decided to follow in his father's footsteps and become a worker. He trained as a mechanic under the tutelage of the revolutionary socialist Melchor Martínez, who himself told Durruti: "I'll make your son a good mechanic, but also a socialist". Influenced by Durruti and Martínez, Buenaventura joined the Unión General de Trabajadores (UGT). Following the outbreak of World War I, Buenaventura was dismissed from his job for participating in a strike action. By this time, Durruti was working at the León repair shop of the Northern Railway Company (CCHNE). Despite being sick at the time, Durruti quickly found his son a steady job as a mechanic for the CCHNE.

On 17 May 1923, Bilbao governor Fernando González Regueral was assassinated in León by members of Los Solidarios, but the police never caught them. In the aftermath, the Leonese press published speculations that a local anarchist group, led by Durruti's son Buenaventura, had carried out the attack. Not knowing who the perpretrators were, the Leonese police carried out a series of arbitrary arrests. Durruti's son Santiago was detained. The police even attempted to arrest Durruti himself, but as he was very ill and confined to his bed, his wife and neighbours prevented them from taking him in. Nevertheless, Durruti remained highly regarded in the city. Following the 1923 Spanish coup d'état, which established the dictatorship of Primo de Rivera, Durruti was appointed to the City Council of León and served under Mayor Raimundo del Río López.

Durruti kept in touch with Buenaventura following his 1926 attempt to assassinate Alfonso XIII and his spree of bank robberies in Latin America, for which he was respectively imprisoned in France and wanted for extradition to Argentina. In December 1931, Durruti fell gravely ill and asked to see Buenaventura one last time before he died. His son travelled to León to see him, but by the time he arrived, Durruti had already died. His funeral was organised by the local branches of the UGT and the Confederación Nacional del Trabajo (CNT), who hoped to pay tribute to him as an old leader of the Leonese socialist movement. After the funeral, at the request of the CNT, Buenaventura spoke at a rally and called for a social revolution against the government of Spain.

== Bibliography ==
- Enzensberger, Hans Magnus (2018) [1972]. Anarchy's Brief Summer: The Life and Death of Buenaventura Durruti. Translated by Mitchell, Mike. Seagull Books. ISBN 9780857426000. OCLC 1077270536.
- Íñiguez, Miguel (2001). Esbozo de una enciclopedia histórica del anarquismo español (in Spanish). Madrid: Fundación de Estudios Libertarios Anselmo Lorenzo. ISBN 9788486864453. OCLC 807322760.
- Iglesias, Ignacio G. (1976). "Muerto el 20 de noviembre de 1936: Buenaventura Durruti, un revolucionario nato". Tiempo de historia (in Spanish). 2 (24): 4–17.
- Llarch, Joan (1973). La muerte de Durruti (in Spanish). Barcelona: Ediciones Aura.
- Paulino, Davi Luiz (2018). "A contribuição da experiência internacional ao anarquismo de Buenaventura Durruti". Encontro de Pesquisa na Graduação em História (in Portuguese). Vol. 6. pp. 648–659. ISBN 978-65-87621-39-5.
- Paz, Abel (2006) [1996]. Durruti in the Spanish Revolution. Translated by Morse, Chuck. Edinburgh: AK Press. ISBN 1-904859-50-X. LCCN 2006920974. OCLC 482919277.
