= Durruti =

Durruti is a Basque surname, derived from the word Urruti (English: far away). It originally referred to Basques who lived in the mountains far away from urban centres.

== People ==
- Buenaventura Durruti (1896–1936), Spanish anarchist revolutionary
- Colette Durruti (1931–2025), Spanish-French businesswoman and activist
- Pedro Durruti (1911–1937), Spanish Falangist activist
- Santiago Durruti (d. 1931), Spanish trade unionist and politician

== Organisations ==
- Durruti Column, a militia column named after and led by Buenaventura Durruti
- Friends of Durruti, an anarchist militant group
