= Colette Durruti =

Spanish-French businesswoman and activist (1931–2025

- Born: Colette Durruti Morin; 4 December 1931; Barcelona, Catalonia, Spain
- Died: 19 April 2025 (aged 93); Morellàs i les Illes, Northern Catalonia, France
- Occupation: Businessperson
- Parents: Buenaventura Durruti (father); Émilienne Morin (mother)

Colette Durruti Morin (1931–2025) was a Spanish-French businesswoman and activist. The daughter of the Spanish anarchist Buenaventura Durruti and the French anarchist Émilienne Morin, she grew up in poverty and constantly moving. After her father was killed in action in the Spanish Civil War, her mother took her to France, where she lived for the rest of her life. She involved herself in campaigns to preserve the historical memory of her father and later moved to Brittany. There she ran a dairy business, raised her family and provided primary sources about her father to historians until she retired to Northern Catalonia.

== Biography ==
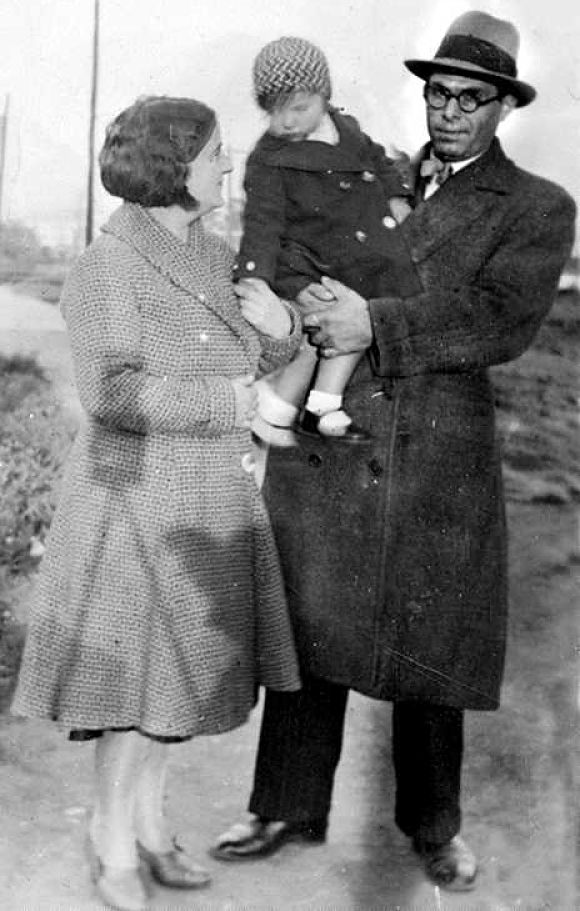
A young Colette, held by her father Buenaventura Durruti, together with her mother Émilienne Morin

Colette Durruti Morin was born in Barcelona, on 4 December 1931, the daughter of the Spanish anarchist Buenaventura Durruti and French anarchist Émilienne Morin. Her family lived in poverty at the time of her birth, with her father having to charge a former employer an indemnity to buy her essential items. When Colette was only two months old, on 10 February 1932, her father was arrested and deported to Africa for his involvement in an anarchist insurrection. To provide for her without her father, her mother took a job as an usher at a cinema and left her in the care of the trade union activist Teresa Margaleff. By the time her father was able to return home and stay there, following the proclamation of an amnesty in 1934, Durruti had grown and learnt to walk and speak without her father's presence. He returned to caring for his daughter, singing her revolutionary songs as he bathed and fed her.

Following the outbreak of the Spanish Civil War, Durruti's parents went to fight on the Aragon front and left her in the care of Margaleff. She was only five years old when her father was killed in action, but she remembered him affectionately. Her father's friend Joan Garcia Oliver held Durruti up as an example of "all the children whose parents have perished". Her mother returned to Barcelona to care for her, seeking to raise her in accordance with her anarchist ideals. Not long after her father's death, Durruti left Spain together with her mother and went into exile in France.

Colette grew up in France, becoming a French citizen after she married Roger Marlot in the 1950s. Together they had two children, Yvon and Rémi. Colette rarely participated in any anarchist campaigns, whether by Spanish exiles or local French activists. Her activism was largely dedicated to preserving the historical memory of her father. Anti-Francoist activist Octavio Alberola, who met Durruti during the 1950s, described her approach to activism as "tokenistic". By the 1970s, she was living in the Breton city of Kemper. There she managed a dairy company until her retirement. Durruti provided letters written by her father to Abel Paz, who used them as primary sources while writing the biography Durruti in the Spanish Revolution. On 29 May 1971, she was interviewed about her father by the German writer Hans Magnus Enzensberger. She told him that:

He lived for what he thought. That is something wonderful. Sometimes I envy him. His life was a proper life. I don't believe that it was in vain. Of course, now he's dead, they all want to claim him for their own. As long as he was alive, they pursued him like a criminal. Now even the bourgeoisie see some good in him and the priests want to embalm him. A dead revolutionary is always a good revolutionary.

Durruti retired to Northern Catalonia, where she died on 19 April 2025.

== Bibliography ==
- Comotto, Agustín (2022). The Weight of the Stars: The Life of Anarchist Octavio Alberola. Translated by Sharkey, Paul. AK Press. ISBN 978-1849354097.
- Enzensberger, Hans Magnus (2018) [1972]. Anarchy's Brief Summer: The Life and Death of Buenaventura Durruti. Translated by Mitchell, Mike. Seagull Books. ISBN 9780857426000. OCLC 1077270536.
- Latchford, Rob (22 April 2025). "Adios to Colette Durruti". Freedom. ISSN 0016-0504.
- Paz, Abel (2006) [1996]. Durruti in the Spanish Revolution. Translated by Morse, Chuck. Edinburgh: AK Press. ISBN 1-904859-50-X. LCCN 2006920974. OCLC 482919277.
