= Emily Summers =

American interior designer

- Born: 1944 (age 81–82); Kansas City, Missouri, United States
- Occupation: Interior designer
- Spouse: Steve Summers

Emily Summers (born 1945), is an American interior designer. She is president and CEO of Emily Summers Design Associates. Beginning her design career in 1979, she became known for her collaboration with architects and artists along with the collection, commission, and architectural installation of fine art into projects. Her firm, Emily Summers Design Associates, has been recognized for using unexpected materials, creating custom pieces for each project, and combining them with 20th-century furniture and decorative objects for clients. Summers is also recognized for her involvement in urban planning, museums and fine art, higher education, and historic preservation.

== Biography ==
Emily Rich Summers was born in Kansas City, Missouri in 1945. She received a Fashion Merchandising scholarship and attended Southern Methodist University in Dallas, Texas. In 1966, she received a Bachelor of Fine Arts from SMU. Later, she continued her education by completing five more years (1975–1980) of Post Graduate studies in Art History. During her studies at SMU, she worked at the fashion offices at Neiman Marcus. Today, she directs an in house team of designers and collaborates with architects. The firm has offices located in both Dallas and New York City. Summers is married to Steve Summers. They have three grown children.

== Design career ==
Summers has been recognized by Architectural Digest as one of the 100 Best Architects and Interior Designers in the World. By Presidential Appointment, she served on the Advisory Council on Historic Preservation from 2002 to 2006. Here, she served as chair for the Communication, Education, and Outreach Committee. Summers also received Interiors Magazine's 16th Annual Award. This award was for Best Residential Design for a private residence. The residence was featured in the 2012 book, The Iconic House: Architectural Masterworks Since 1900, by Dominic Bradbury.

=== Residential and commercial ===
Summers and her firm, Emily Summers Design Associates, design private homes, commercial spaces, and corporate offices. Architectural Digest has described her work as possessing “clarity of vision” and her interiors as “luxurious yet restrained.”[1]

Early in her career, Summers was asked to join Antoine Predock to design the interior for a new residence on Turtle Creek in Dallas. This five-year project resulted in an award-winning building. The home, the interior, and the later conversion of the Turtle Creek Pump House (a connecting turn of the century waterworks plant) has been widely published. Since the Turtle Creek Residence with Antione Predock, Summers’ work has been distinguished through her collaboration with noted architects.

Current projects include collaborations with Appleton & Associates, Lake/Flato, Werner Field, the renovation of a 1978 home by Enslie “Bud” Oglesby with Chad Dorsey, and a project in Johnson-Fain's Museum Tower. Most recently her firm completed a full renovation with Good Fulton and Farrell of a 30,000 square foot private office in the iconic Highland Park Village, the 1931 buildings by Fooshee and Cheek. Other past collaborations include the Rey Rosa Ranch with architects Coleman Coker and the late Samuel Mockbee and a Horseshoe Bay residence with Overland Partners.

Summers’ firm has also collaborated with Lake/Flato on multiple projects, including the Murchison Estate for the late arts patron, Lupe Murchison. Architect Larry Speck and Summers renovated a 1970 Turtle Creek residence by Enslie “Bud” Oglesby.

Summers also restored the Perkins Chapel at Southern Methodist University with Good Fulton and Farrell and the Academic Research Center at The Hockaday School with Overland Partners Architects. Private-residences, include the two penthouse units at the Victory Park development in Dallas: The W Hotel Penthouse in 2007 and, with MORE design+build, The House Penthouse in 2011.

In February 2010, Summers enlisted architect Jessica Stewart-Lendvay to restore a 1968 home consisting of completely circular structures in Colorado Springs, the renovation was featured on the cover of Architectural Digest.

=== Consultation ===
She has been actively involved with the Dallas Museum of Art for over thirty-six years, where she served as a design consultant for its Horchow Auditorium with architect Gluckman Mayner. She held a staff position as director of Exhibitions and Fundraising from 1989 to 1992, and currently serves on the Building Committee.

Summers served on the President's Advisory Council for the Dallas Center for Performing Arts, and consulted and contributed to the interiors of its new Dee and Charles Wyly Theatre and Margot and Bill Winspear Opera House. Her work for Dee and Charles Wyly Theater in Dallas was in collaboration with architects Joshua Prince-Ramus and Rem Koolhaas & Associates.

She consulted on the Margot and Bill Winspear Opera House, designed by Spencer de Grey and Norman Foster + Partners, and designed, with Gensler Dallas, the interiors for the Dallas Opera Offices at the Opera House.

She completed two adaptive reuse projects for historic homes at the Dallas Arboretum with architects Booziotis and Company. The DeGolyer house, completed in 1940 by architect Denmen Scott and Burton Schutt, is a 21,000 square foot estate in the Spanish Colonial Revival style.

The Camp House, completed in 1938 by architect John Staub, was originally the 8,500 square foot home of Alex Camp and Roberta Coke Camp. These two projects were awarded by the Preservation Dallas and by the American Society of Interior Designers Texas Chapter for their achievement in adaptive reuse.

=== Art and design collections ===
Summers has a 36-year affiliation with the Dallas Museum of Art and is a member of the Architecture and Design Council at the Palm Springs Art Museum. Her expertise in the international art market, cultivated through yearly visits to art shows, dealers, and galleries globally, has established her signature approach as an interior designer. Her integration of fine art and applied arts has been widely recognized.

Summers clients' collections feature Modern American Art, Contemporary British Art, ceramics, sculpture, commission pieces and installations, photography, and 20th century furniture and functional design.

== Awards ==
For over thirty years, her residential and commercial work has been awarded and published. Beginning in 1997, she was included on the House Beautiful "Top 100 Designers" and was their "House Beautiful Design Star" of 1999. In 2001 and 2002, she received the Texas Society of Architects Residential Design Awards, and in 2003 she received the Texas Society of Landscape Architects Merit Award.

In 2012, she was selected to the Architectural Digest "AD 100" Best Architects and Interior Designers of the World. She has consecutively received this award since her first inclusion on the "AD 100" list in 2007.

Additionally, she has received many first place ASID awards over multiple years including Best Historic Preservation, Best Residential Kitchen, Best Living Room, Best Residential Contemporary Large, and Best Bedroom. She also received ASID's Design Ovation Award for Residential Design in 2004 and their Architectural Award of 1995.

Summers received Preservation Dallas' Preservation Achievement Award for Residential Restoration & Rehabilitation for 2003, and their Preservation Achievement Award for Perkins Chapel on the Southern Methodist University Campus for 2001.

In 2002, Summers received AIA Dallas' Design Honor Award for Academic Research Center for The Hockaday School. Summers was further distinguished when she received Interior Magazine's 16th Annual Award for Best Residential Design for a private residence with Antoine Predock in 1995.

== Books ==
- Benedikt, Michael L. Overland Partners: Building on Values. Milan, L'Arca Edizione, 2002
- Gura, Judith. House Beautiful: Lighting. New York: Hearst Books, 2002.
- Hollingsworth, Andrew. Danish Modern. Utah: Gibbs Smith, 2008.
- Medford, Sarah. At Home with Town & Country. New York: Hearst Books, 2010.
- Predock, Antoine. Turtle Creek House. New York: Monacelli Press, Inc., 1998.
- Trulove, James Grayson and Kim II, eds., The New American House 3. New York: Watson Guptill Publications. 2001.
- The Iconic House: Architectural Masterworks Since 1900.
