= Francisca Saperas Mirò =

- Born: 12 February 1851
- Died: 21 August 1933 (aged 82)
- Known for: exile in Marseille and anarchist activism

Francisca Saperas Mirò was a Spanish anarchist and anarcho-syndicalist. She was born on 12 February 1851 in Barcelona and died on 21 August 1933. She is known for having sheltered anarchists wanted by the police. Antònia Fontanillas Borràs was her granddaughter.

== Biography ==
Her parents was Maria Mirò de Montblanc and Isidro Saperas, a weaver from Espugla de Francoli, both from the province of Tarragona. Francisca Saperas married Martin Borràs Jover, a shoemaker from Igualada, on 19 October 1869. They both came from Catholic families. She had about ten children, but only five daughters remained alive: Salud, Antonietta, Mercedes, Maria and Estrella.

=== Anarchist beginnings ===
The couple was poor and Martin worked at home as a weaver. Gracia, an industrial center of the textile industry, was a city of 34,000 inhabitants in 1877, many of them workers. The city became a center of trade union militancy. The couple was part of the first Spanish International. Giuseppe Fanelli went to Barcelona and Madrid between 1868 and 1869, promoting the birth of the first workers' sections of the International Workingmen's Association and the Alliance of Socialist Democracy. The couple adhered to these movements of anarchist values.

Francisca and Martin adhered to the theses of the anarchist communists, who oppose the collectivist current of the Federation of Workers of the Spanish Region (FRTE). Francesca and Martin denounced the centralization and lack of autonomy of the sections of the FRTE. They read Le Révolté and Le Forçat du Travail. They publish two newspapers themselves La Justicia Humana and Tierra y Libertad. They affirmed their position as anarchist and illegalist communists. They defend a workers' organization by informal groups without structures, emanating from neighborhoods but also from the family. As a result, Francesca Saperas opened her home to fugitives without means, which earned her the nickname of mother of the anarchists according to Federica Montseny.

=== Arrest and suicide of Martin Borras ===
Following the explosion of the bomb of Paulino Pallás on 24 September 1893, aimed at the military parade of Arsenio Martinez Campos, Martin Borràs was arrested on 25 September. Pallas was executed on 29 September. Although Martin Borràs was cleared of all charges in the attack of 24 September 1893, he was implicated in the explosion of the Liceu theater, which occurred on 7 November 1893, while he was in prison. He committed suicide in May 1894 by swallowing sulfur.

=== Consequences of the attack of the street Cambios Nuevos ===
Three years after Martin's death, Francesca Saperas met Thomas Ascheri, who had deserted the French army and was also an anarchist. He worked with Michele Angiolillo at the magazine Ciencia Social.

On 7 June 1896 a bomb attack was committed on Cambios Nuevos street during a religious procession. 400 arrests were made, among them 15 women who were companions of anarchists. Teresa Claramunt was also arrested. Thomas Ascheri, Francesca and her daughter Solud, her sons-in-law Luis Màs and Juan Botista Ollé were arrested, and Thomas and Luis were shot on 4 May 1897, despite the lack of evidence of their involvement in the attack.

Francesca and her daughter Solud were imprisoned in the Reina Amalia prison. The men, as well as Teresa Claramunt, were taken to Montjuich, where they were tortured in a way that drove Luis Màs mad. Antonietta, Juan Botista Ollé's companion, went to live with her sisters, Francesca's three youngest daughters, Maria, Mercedes and Estrella, but due to lack of funds they were forced to give up their home. They lived in a poverty that finally moved the public opinion, and Maria and Mercedes were placed in a home, while Estrella stayed with Antonietta.

In the Reina Amalia prison, run by nuns, Solud gave birth to a baby that she did not have the strength to feed, and that was taken away from her when she gave it to another woman, Assumpcio Valvé, to nurse. The baby of Assumpcio was also taken from her. Then, Francesca and Solud were forced to marry religiously with their companions on 3 May 1897, just before their execution.

Francesca and Solud were condemned to be exiled without being judged and taken to the border. They settled in Marseille. The Barcelona authorities, invoking their misconduct, refused to give them back their children.

== Bibliography ==
- Hélène Finet (2017). Libertarias : femmes anarchistes espagnoles (in French). Paris: Nada. p. 19-57. ISBN 979-10-92457-15-5.
- "SAPERAS MIRÓ, Francisca - [Dictionnaire international des militants anarchistes]". www.militants-anarchistes.info (in French).
- (in Spanish) Miguel Iñiguez, Esbozo de una Enciclopedia histórica del anarquismo español, Fundación de Estudios Libertarios Anselmo Lorenzo, Madrid, 2001, page 561.
