= Salud Borràs Saperas =

Catalan anarchist (1878–1954)

- Born: January 1878; Barcelona, Spain
- Died: August 11, 1954 (aged 76); Paris

Salud Borràs Saperas (1878–1954) was a Catalan anarchist.

== Life ==
Salud Borrás Saperas was born in January 1878 to Martin Borras Jover and Francesca Saperas Miró in Barcelona. In her youth, she helped her parents distribute her father's anarchist newspaper Tierra y Libertad. Her father killed himself in 1893 while imprisoned in the Barcelona Model Prison. The state forced Borràs Saperas to marry her companion since 1895, Luis Mas Gasio, under threat of taking their children away.

Her partner and her mother's new partner were both arrested for the 1896 Barcelona Cambios Nuevos bombing and executed the next year. Both Borràs Saperas and her mother were sentenced to a year in prison and deported to France. Borrás Saperas married Octave Jahn in 1902. They lived in Charente before moving to Mexico in 1908, where Jahn fought alongside the Zapatistas in the Mexican Revolution. Borràs Saperas returned to Barcelona without him in 1911 and moved to Paris with her son in 1913, traveling frequently between Spain, France, and Mexico in this time period. Her partner died in 1917.

In 1930, Borràs Saperas returned to Barcelona. After the rise of the Franco regime, she returned to France, where she lived in exile and where her son would be murdered. Borràs Saperas died on August 11, 1954, in Paris.

== See also ==
- Anarchism in Spain
