= Miro manga erua =

A miro manga erua was a sledge device that might have been used by the people of Easter Island to transport their famous large stone heads, known as moai from rock quarries to their positions around the edges of the island. A miro manga erua is made out of a forked tree trunk. Thor Heyerdahl describes them as a Y-shaped figure with crosspieces.
