= Feliza Teresa Miro =

Filipino beauty pageant winner and mayor

Feliza Teresita "Liz" Nuesa Miro (a.k.a. Lisa Teresa Santos Miro, Feliza Teresita Miro, Feliza Teresa Miro, Feliza Teresa Nuevo Miro, and Tetchie Miro Estrella) is a Filipino model and beauty pageant titleholder. She was born on May 11, 1953 in Manila, Philippines to Engr. Antonio Santos Miro of San Pablo, Isabela and Feliza Teresita "Tess" Pimentel Nuesa of Santa Cruz, Ilocos Sur. She was the eldest of 8 siblings.

She won the first Miss Republic of the Philippines 1969 Beauty Pageant (defeated Vida Doria, Binibining Pilipinas Universe 1971) and was the Philippines' official candidate to the Miss World 1969 Beauty Pageant in London, United Kingdom. After her reign as Miss Philippines, she starred in the movie Kill RP Nine-O (1974) with Senator Ramon B. Revilla.

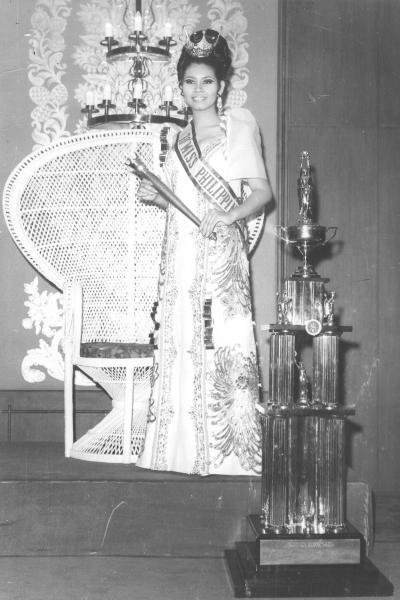
Miss Republic of the Philippines 1969

She was widowed on her first marriage to Renato J. Dupaya, son of Congressman Tito Dupaya of the 1st District, Cagayan Province(1962–1972, 3rd District 1987-1992) and Governor Teresa J. Dupaya, Cagayan Province(1964–1980, 1987). Then married Congressman Conrado "Jojo" B. Estrella Jr., 5th District, Pangasinan(1987–1992) son of Secretary Conrado F. Estrella Sr., Department of Agrarian Reform(1966–1986). She has three children; Michelle Teresa Miro Dupaya-Tumagay, Marvine Simon Miro Estrella, and Marlon Matthew Miro Estrella.

She was elected Municipal Mayor of Villasis, Pangasinan(1988–1992), making her the Philippines' first major beauty title holder to hold such a position and also the first female mayor of the town.

== Notable relatives ==
- Mayor Bernardo V. Tumagay, Municipality of Plaridel, Quezon Province (2013-present), (Vice mayor 2004–2013), son-in-law.
- Vice Mayor Anjo T. Miro, Municipality of San Pablo, Isabela(2016-present) Mayor(2013-2016), nephew.
- Mayor Antonio N. Miro Jr., Municipality of San Pablo, Isabela(1986–1987, 2004–2013, 2016-present), brother.
- Governor Robert V. Dulay, La Union(1986–1987), brother-in-law, married to sister Grace.
- Governor Joaquin L. Ortega, La Union(1988–1992)1st District Representative(1970–1986), uncle, married to mother's older sister Fely.
- Congressman Simplicio B. Domingo, Jr., 2nd District, Isabela(1984–1992), uncle, married to mother's youngest sister Fe.
