= Abel Paz =

Spanish anarchist historian (1921–2009)

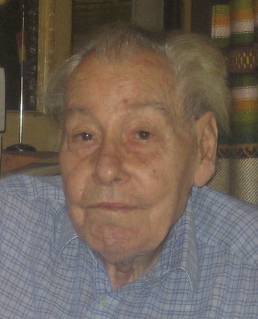
- Abel Paz (2007)
- Born: Diego Antonio Camacho Escámez; August 12, 1921; Almería, Andalusia, Spain
- Died: April 13, 2009 (aged 87); Barcelona, Spain
- Other name: Abel Paz
- Occupations: Anarchist, writer, historian
- Known for: Spanish anarchist, anti-fascist, biographer of Durruti

Abel Paz (August 12, 1921 – April 13, 2009) was a Spanish anarchist and historian who fought in the Spanish Civil War. He wrote multiple volumes on anarchist history, including Durruti in the Spanish Revolution, a biography of the influential anarchist Buenaventura Durruti. He kept the anarchist tradition throughout his life, including time in Francoist Spain's jails (1942-1947 and 1950-1952) and multiple decades in exile in France (1953-1978).

== Background ==
Abel Paz was born Diego Antonio Camacho Escámez on August 12, 1921, in Almería, southeastern Andalusia, Spain. When he was six years old, he moved in with his Barcelonan uncle, who was a member of the Confederación Nacional del Trabajo (CNT), a Spanish anarcho-syndicalist labor union. Before his teens, Paz had joined the libertarian Ferrerist school Escuela Natura in Barcelona's El Clot working class district. He moved back briefly to Almería, where his mother was, too, a CNT member and subscribed to the Libertarian Youth in 1935.

== Career ==
=== Spanish Civil War ===
By February 1936, Paz had returned to Barcelona just before the start of the Spanish Revolution and Civil War. He participated in the resistance after Francisco Franco's 1936 pronunciamento. He joined the CNT (allied with the Federación Anarquista Ibérica, founded as a group that fought the CNT moderate policies, and fought for the working class and anarchists). Following his 1937 arrest in a clash with Stalinists, he worked in a farm collective, wrote for the FAI's Tierra y Libertad periodical, and fought on the Catalan front.

=== Post-war ===
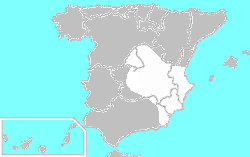
Spain after the Catalonia Offensive (nationalist Spain in gray, Republican Spain in white)

As the war approached its end in early 1939, when Franco's Nationalists retook Catalonia, Paz and hundreds of thousands of anarchists sought asylum in France. In 1942, he returned to Catalonia and attempted to restart the CNT. He was jailed and passed between prisons for five years. Shortly after his release, he was jailed again for another five years for participating in the Libertarian Youth.

=== Exile ===
After his release in 1952, Paz returned to the resistance and became the underground organization's delegate to the 1953 International Congress.

Paz remained exiled in France, where he traveled and participated in anti-Francoist, CNT, and Libertarian Youth groups. His partner Antònia Fontanillas (also of anarchist lineage) traveled with him through 1958. Over the next decade, Paz wrote multiple history books, including a biography of CNT figure Buenaventura Durruti, known as the most comprehensive account as of the late 2000s. His work covering Durruti covered an explanation of the failure of Durruti's militia to take Zaragoza after the capture of Bujaraloz.

=== Return ===
In 1975, Francisco Franco died. In 1979, Paz returned to Spain and its anarchist movement. He wrote a four-volume memoir and spoke with young libertarians about his experiences. In the mid-1990s, Paz toured Italian public meetings following interest in Ken Loach's 1995 film about the Spanish Civil War, Land and Freedom. He participated in media accounts of the war through his physical decline and death.

== Personal and death ==
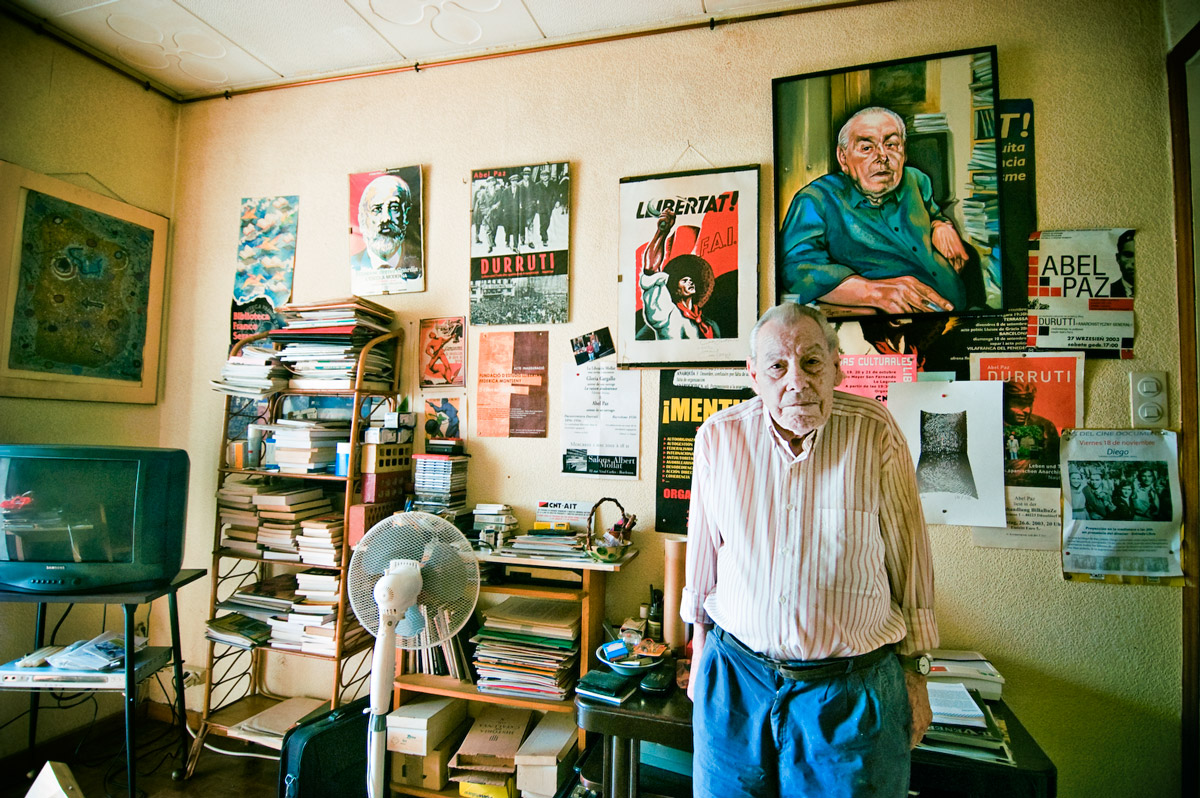
Paz at his Barcelonan apartment, 2006

Paz's life partner was Antònia Fontanillas.

He died age 87 on April 13, 2009, in Barcelona.

== Selected works ==
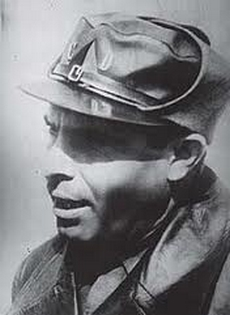
Buenaventura Durruti during the Spanish Civil War.

- La Barcelona Rebelde: Guía De Una Ciudad Silenciada Octaedro, 2003. ISBN 978-84-8063-628-5
- Durruti en la Revolución Española. Fundación Anselmo Lorenzo, 1996.
- Durruti in the Spanish Revolution. AK Press, 2006. ISBN 978-1-904859-50-5. Translated by Chuck W. Morse.
- Durruti: the people armed. Black Rose, 1976. ISBN 978-0-919618-74-9 (pbk.) ISBN 978-0-919618-73-2 (hbk.)
- The Spanish civil war. Hazan, 1997. ISBN 978-2-85025-532-8
- The Story of the Iron Column: Militant Anarchism in the Spanish Civil War. AK Press and Kate Sharpley Library, 2011. ISBN 978-1-84935-064-8. Translated by Paul Sharkey.

== See also ==
- Anarchism in Spain
