= Monegros =

- Comarca
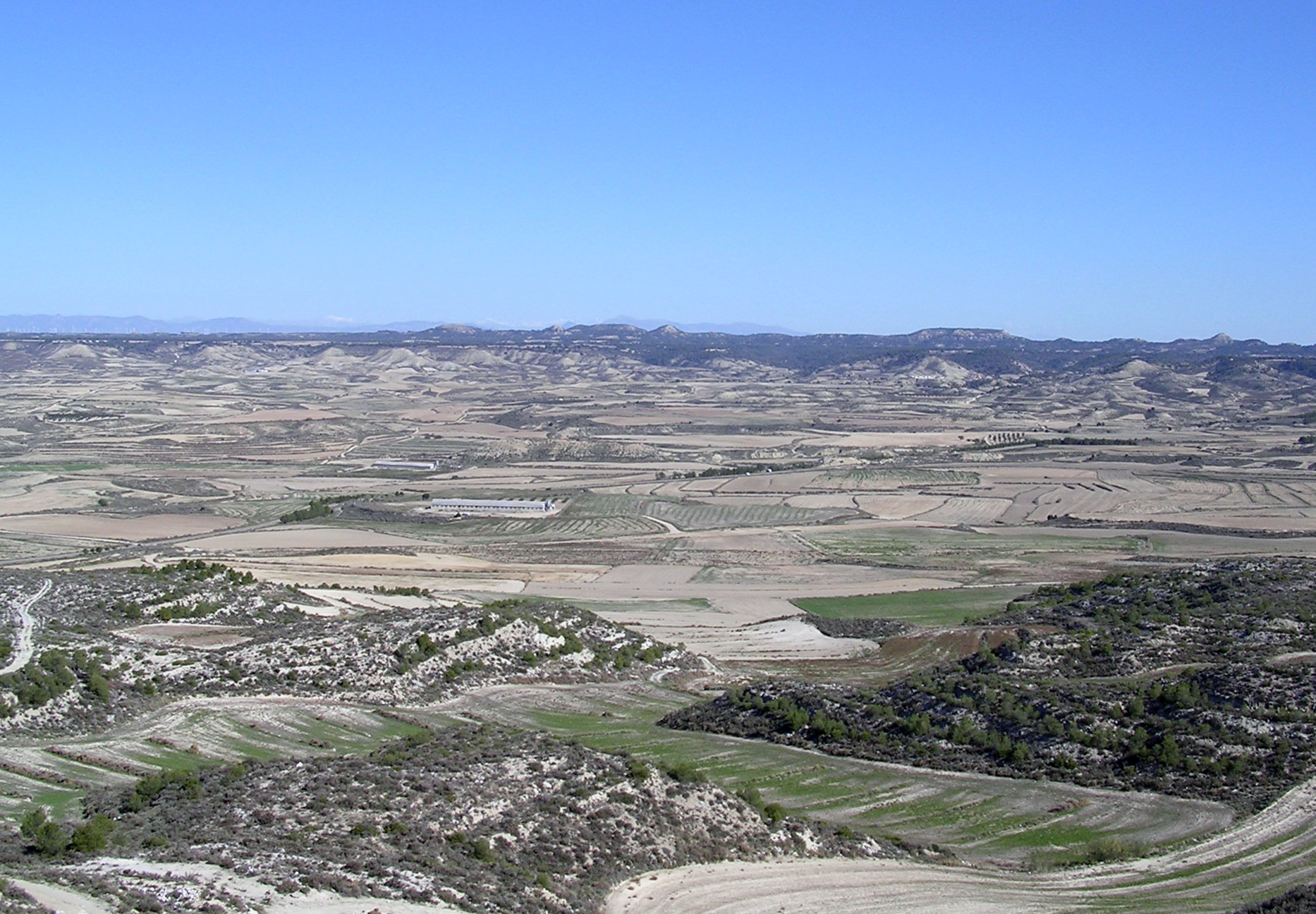
- Typical landscape of the Monegros near Leciñena.

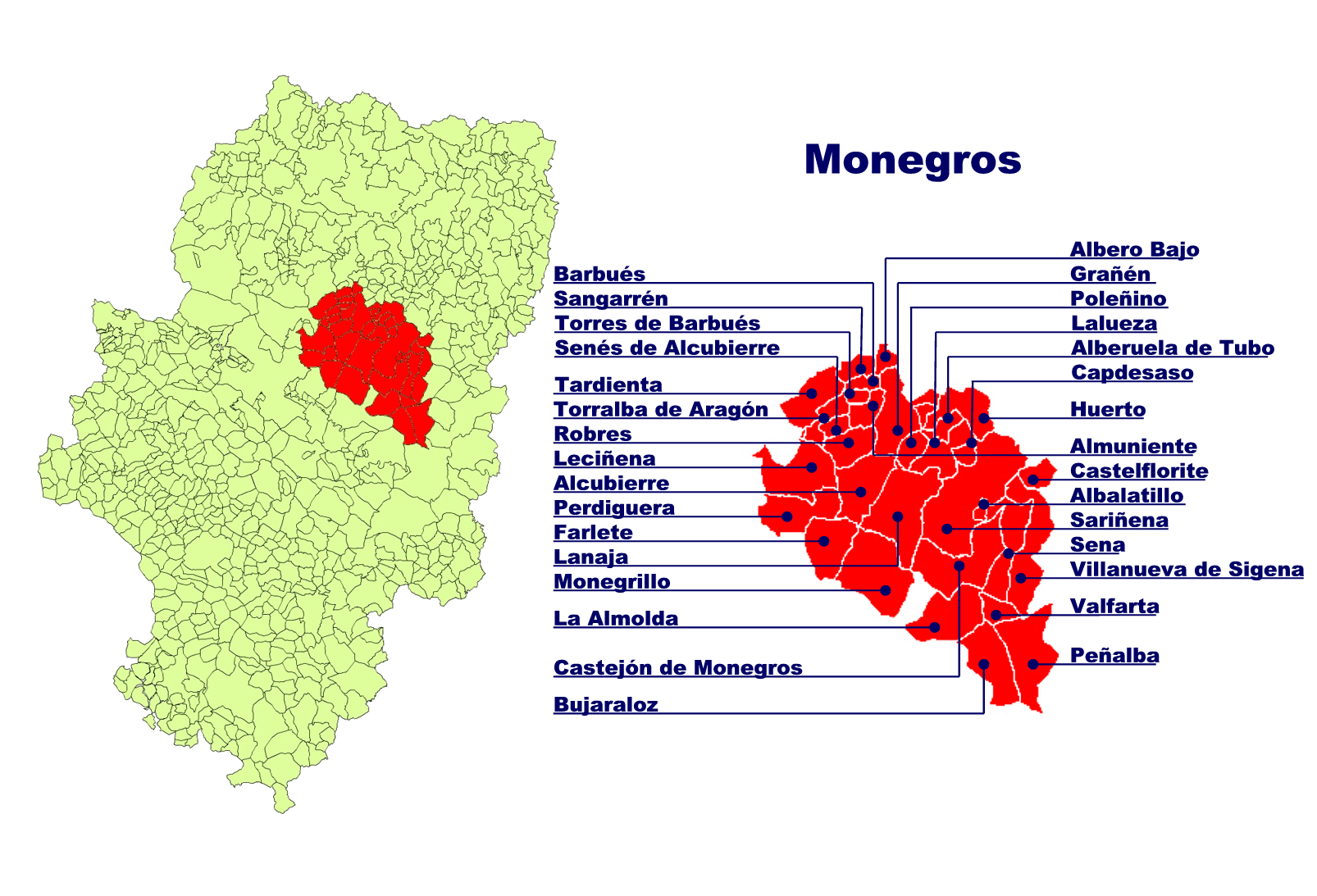
- Coordinates: 41°47′N 0°10′W
- Country: Spain
- Autonomous community: Aragon
- Province: Huesca
- Capital: Sariñena
- Municipalities: List: Albalatillo, Albero Bajo, Alberuela de Tubo, Alcubierre, La Almolda, Almuniente, Barbués, Bujaraloz, Capdesaso, Castejón de Monegros, Castelflorite, Farlete, Grañén, Huerto, Lalueza, Lanaja, Laperdiguera, Leciñena, Monegrillo, Peñalba, Perdiguera, Poleñino, Robres, Sangarrén, Sariñena, Sena, Senés de Alcubierre, Tardienta, Torralba de Aragón, Torres de Barbués, Valfarta and Villanueva de Sigena

Area
  - Total: 2,764.9 km^{2} (1,067.5 sq mi)

Population (2006)
  - Total: 20,376
  - Density: 7.3695/km^{2} (19.087/sq mi)
- Time zone: UTC+1 (CET)
  - Summer (DST): UTC+2 (CEST)

Los Monegros is a comarca in Aragon, Spain. It is located within the provinces of Zaragoza and Huesca. The area is prone to chronic droughts, and much of the area is a natural region made up of badlands.

Los Monegros borders seven comarcas: Hoya de Huesca to the North; Somontano de Barbastro, Cinca Medio, and Bajo Cinca to the East; Zaragoza to the West; and Ribera Baja del Ebro and Bajo Aragón-Caspe to the South.

== General information ==
The Sierra de Alcubierre mountain chain crosses the comarca from Northwest to Southeast. Its maximum elevation is 822 meters, at the mountain called Oscuro. The climate is semiarid, with scarce rainfall and high temperatures in the autumn. The area has numerous saltwater and freshwater lakes, including the Lake of Sariñena and the Lake of la Playa.

The area's cultural heritage includes several historical monasteries, including the Monasterio de Santa María de Sigena and the Charterhouse of Las Fuentes.

In December 2007, the local government announced that the comarca had been chosen for the site of the Gran Scala, a huge European project to build a "destination city of leisure for all ages." Designed to include numerous theme parks and casinos, the area would become one of the primary entertainment centers of Europe.

== Territory and population ==
| No. | Municipality | Area (km2) | % of total | Inhabitants (2006) | % of total | Altitude (m) | Town |
|---|---|---|---|---|---|---|---|
| 1 | Albalatillo | 9.1 | 0.3 | 255 | 1.2 | 259 | |
| 2 | Albero Bajo | 22.2 | 0.8 | 111 | 0.5 | 411 | |
| 3 | Alberuela de Tubo | 20.8 | 0.8 | 357 | 1.7 | 350 | Sodeto |
| 4 | Alcubierre | 115.3 | 4.2 | 441 | 2.1 | 466 | |
| 5 | Almolda (La) | 131.3 | 4.7 | 638 | 3.1 | 491 | |
| 6 | Almuniente | 37.6 | 1.4 | 559 | 2.7 | 337 | Frula |
| 7 | Barbués | 19.6 | 0.7 | 115 | 0.6 | 361 | |
| 8 | Bujaraloz | 120.9 | 4.4 | 997 | 4.8 | 327 | |
| 9 | Capdesaso | 17.7 | 0.6 | 161 | 0.8 | 313 | |
| 10 | Castejón de Monegros | 165.3 | 6.0 | 655 | 3.1 | 466 | |
| 11 | Castelflorite | 34.8 | 1.3 | 131 | 0.6 | 310 | |
| 12 | Farlete | 104.1 | 3.8 | 447 | 2.1 | 413 | |
| 13 | Grañén | 124.0 | 4.5 | 2009 | 9.6 | 332 | Callen, Curbe, Fraella, Montesusin |
| 14 | Huerto | 86.7 | 3.1 | 258 | 1.2 | 370 | Usón, Venta de Ballerías |
| 15 | Lalueza | 88.2 | 3.2 | 1136 | 5.4 | 285 | Marcen, San Lorenzo del Flumen |
| 16 | Lanaja | 183.7 | 6.6 | 1457 | 7.0 | 369 | Cantalobos, Orillena. |
| 17 | Leciñena | 178.6 | 6.5 | 1288 | 6.2 | 415 | |
| 18 | Monegrillo | 183.2 | 6.6 | 495 | 2.4 | 437 | |
| 19 | Peñalba | 156.7 | 5.7 | 756 | 3.6 | 254 | |
| 20 | Perdiguera | 109.8 | 4.0 | 621 | 3.0 | 473 | |
| 21 | Poleñino | 33.0 | 1.2 | 247 | 1.2 | 290 | |
| 22 | Robres | 64.3 | 2.3 | 643 | 3.1 | 400 | |
| 23 | Sangarrén | 32.2 | 1.2 | 263 | 1.3 | 379 | |
| 24 | Sariñena | 275.6 | 10.0 | 4152 | 19.9 | 281 | La Cartuja de Monegros, Lamasadera, Lastanosa, Pallaruelo de Monegros, San Juan del Flumen |
| 25 | Sena | 104.7 | 3.8 | 556 | 2.7 | 221 | |
| 26 | Senés de Alcubierre | 20.5 | 0.7 | 51 | 0.2 | 390 | |
| 27 | Tardienta | 90.6 | 3.3 | 1035 | 5.0 | 389 | |
| 28 | Torralba de Aragón | 40.4 | 1.5 | 117 | 0.6 | 380 | |
| 29 | Torres de Barbués | 13.9 | 0.5 | 324 | 1.6 | 345 | Valfonda de Santa Ana |
| 30 | Valfarta | 33.2 | 1.2 | 101 | 0.5 | 372 | |
| 31 | Villanueva de Sigena | 146.4 | 5.3 | 520 | 2.5 | 231 | |
| # | Los Monegros | 2764.4 | 100.0 | 20896 | 100.0 | — | |

== See also ==
- Gran Scala
- Aragón
- Comarca
- Monegros Desert
