= Jamón jamón =

1992 film by Bigas Luna

- Theatrical release poster
- Directed by: Bigas Luna
- Written by: Cuca Canals; Bigas Luna; Quim Monzó (dialogue)
- Produced by: Andrés Vicente Gómez
- Starring: Stefania Sandrelli; Anna Galiena; Juan Diego; Penélope Cruz; Javier Bardem; Jordi Mollà
- Cinematography: José Luis Alcaine
- Edited by: Teresa Font
- Music by: Nicola Piovani
- Production company: Lola Films
- Distributed by: United International Pictures
- Release date: 4 September 1992
- Running time: 95 mins
- Country: Spain
- Language: Spanish
- Box office: $6 million (Italy+Spain) $7 million rentals (Outside Spain)

Jamón jamón (Spanish pronunciation: [xaˈmoŋ xaˈmon]; English: Ham, Ham) is a 1992 Spanish romantic tragicomedy film directed by Bigas Luna and starring Javier Bardem, Jordi Mollà, and Penélope Cruz in her debut film. It centers on a young woman named Silvia who becomes pregnant by Jose Luis, the scion of a small but powerful underwear manufacturing empire, and the disastrous fallout of their relationship. The movie engages in word play and puns, and rhapsodises on the juxtaposition of old and new in Spain, as well as many other emotional contrasts such as erotic desire and food.

It is the first film of the so-called Trilogía ibérica by Bigas Luna, followed by Golden Balls (1993) and The Tit and the Moon (1994).

== Plot ==
In a small Spanish town on the edge of the Monegros Desert, the beautiful teenager Silvia spends her evenings making Spanish omelettes to sell at the factory where she works as a seamstress for the Sansón Corporation, a small but powerful men's underwear company that, along with the local Conquistador ham processing plant, serves as one of the two major local employers. Her mother, Carmen, runs a local bar which doubles as a brothel, and where she used to work as a prostitute. Though comfortably middle class now, Carmen still carries a stigma from the townspeople for her past.

Unbeknownst to anyone, Silvia has been having an affair with José Luis, the spoiled and immature heir to the Sansón empire. One day, Silvia tells him that she is pregnant and José Luis impulsively proposes to her with a soda can tab, promising to provide her with a real engagement ring once he has sought his parents' permission for marriage. Fearing disinheritance, José Luis tentatively tells his parents that he is dating Silvia without informing them of the pregnancy. His mother, Conchita, who exerts the most influence over the company, refuses to bless the union. His father Manuel bows to his mother's wishes, while also expressing sympathy for Silvia and Carmen, the latter of whom he used to frequent when she was still a prostitute.

Conchita decides to ruin José Luis and Silvia's relationship by finding a man to seduce her. She chooses Raúl, a ham delivery driver and aspiring bullfighter whom she meets when he is selected as the new Sansón model; Conchita promises the materialistic and ambitious Raúl ample reward should he succeed in his task. After Silvia repels his advances several times, Raúl becomes genuinely attracted to her and begins trying to win her affection in earnest. Meanwhile, Conchita becomes sexually obsessed with Raúl herself and the two begin an affair. When José Luis repeatedly refuses to stand up to his parents, Silvia herself begins an affair with Raúl, while José Luis seeks solace with Carmen, revealed to have been his lover before he began dating Silvia. Amidst the various affairs, Silvia begins having surrealistic dreams containing images of shepherds guiding their flocks through the desert, pigs, and images of herself kneeling nude in the desert cradling ham bones.

Learning of Silvia's betrayal, José Luis forces himself upon Silvia to avenge himself against Raúl. Desperate to keep Raúl, Conchita seduces him at the isolated ham warehouse where he works. José Luis tells Carmen that his relationship with Silvia is over, but she refuses to rekindle their affair; a devastated José Luis goes in search of Raúl. Meanwhile, Silvia, looking for José Luis, arrives at his home and encounters a departing Manuel, who makes advances on her. Initially hesitant, she returns his advances.

José Luis tracks Raúl down to the ham warehouse and catches him with Conchita. The two men fight using ham legs as blunt weapons, (Note: The scene was inspired by Francisco de Goya's Fight with Cudgels.) ending with José Luis injuring Raúl and Raúl bludgeoning José Luis to death. Carmen, Silvia, and Manuel arrive and Silvia returns her soda can tab ring to José Luis's body before returning to Manuel; a weeping Carmen cradles José Luis's body while Conchita comforts Raúl. A shepherd arrives with his flock of sheep, recreating a tableau from Silvia's dreams.

== Cast ==
- Stefania Sandrelli as Conchita
- Anna Galiena as Carmen
- Juan Diego as Manuel
- Penélope Cruz as Silvia
- Javier Bardem as Raúl
- Jordi Mollà as José Luis
- Tomás Martín as José Gabrieles

== Production ==
The film is a Lola Films production. It has the Monegros desert as backdrop. Shooting locations included Peñalba, Fraga, Monegrillo and La Almolda. Footage was shot near the Osborne bull (and the adjoining gas station) in Peñalba, a football pitch in Monegrillo, and a roadhouse near Candasnos.

Much of the dialogue and imagery in the film are composed of word play and visual puns. For example, in Spanish, jamón means "ham;" not only do two characters comment that Silvia's breasts taste like ham, but the phonetically similar jamona, which Raúl calls Silvia, is Spanish slang for a sexy, curvy woman.

== Release ==
The film premiered in Spain on 4 September 1992. It later screened at the 49th Venice International Film Festival.

== Reception ==
Rotten Tomatoes gives the film a 69% rating from 16 reviews with the consensus: "It isn't as provocative or amusing as it pretends to be, but Jamón jamón's cheerfully overheated melodrama is often its own reward."

Ángel Fernández-Santos of El País wrote that the film "is uneven, it lurches and lurches, like a drifting canoe, but when it rises to the crest of its waves it reaches the memorable".

Jamón jamón made $7 million rentals from international exports. The film was number one in Spain and grossed $2.5 million. It was also number one in Italy and grossed a further $3.5 million.

== Accolades ==
Year	Award	Category	Nominee(s)	Result	Ref.
1992	49th Venice International Film Festival	Silver Lion	Bigas Luna	Won	
1993	7th Goya Awards	Best Film		Nominated	
1993	7th Goya Awards	Best Director	Bigas Luna	Nominated	
1993	7th Goya Awards	Best Actor	Javier Bardem	Nominated	
1993	7th Goya Awards	Best Actress	Penélope Cruz	Nominated	
1993	7th Goya Awards	Best Original Screenplay	Cuca Canals, Bigas Luna	Nominated	
1993	7th Goya Awards	Best Sound	Miguel Rejas Ricard Casals	Nominated	

== Soundtrack ==
"Házmelo otra vez" (Concha Valdés Miranda)

== See also ==
- List of Spanish films of 1992
