= Alcubierre (disambiguation) =

Alcubierre may refer to:

== Places ==
- Alcubierre, Huesca, Aragon, Spain; a municipality
- Sierra de Alcubierre, a mountain range in Spain

== People ==
- Count of Alcubierre, a grandee of Spain, see List of current grandees of Spain
- Inocencia Alcubierre (1901-1927) Spanish actress
- Miguel Alcubierre (born 1964) Mexican physicist, discoverer of the Alcubierre metric, inventor of the Alcubierre warp drive theory
- Pedro Latorre Alcubierre, a Spanish colonial governor of Ifni and Spanish Sahara, see List of colonial governors of Ifni
- Roque Joaquín de Alcubierre (1702-1780) Spanish military engineer

== See also ==
- Alcubierre drive, a type of relativistically consistent non-Newtonian spacewarp spaceship drive
- Senés de Alcubierre, Huesca, Aragon, Spain
