= The Devil Within (2026 film) =

- Theatrical release poster
- Spanish: Caminando con el diablo
- Directed by: Rubén Pérez-Barrena
- Written by: Jesús Miguel Quintana; Rubén Pérez-Barrena
- Produced by: Beatriz Bodegas
- Starring: Tamar Novas; Marina Salas; Iván Marcos; Annick Weerts; Alban Petit; Vicente Vergara; Mateo Medina; Álvaro Lafora; Alejandro Cano
- Cinematography: Javier Salmones
- Edited by: Santiago Paiz
- Music by: Juanjo Javierre
- Production companies: La Canica Films; Caminando la Película AIE; Mother Superior Films
- Distributed by: Filmax
- Release date: 6 March 2026 (Spain)
- Running time: 83 minutes
- Countries: Spain; Uruguay
- Language: Spanish

The Devil Within (Spanish: Caminando con el diablo, lit. 'walking with the Devil') is a 2026 rural thriller film directed by Rubén Pérez Barrena and co-written by Jesús Miguel Quintana. It stars Tamar Novas, Marina Salas, Iván Marcos, Annick Weerts, and Alban Petit. It is a Spanish-Uruguayan co-production.

== Plot ==
Set in the 1980s in a remote Spanish village, the plot follows a couple (Miguel and Alicia) broken by the loss of their son Gabriel as they cross paths with French boy Philippe as the latter arrives in the village with his parents (pregnant Marie and Spanish immigrant Tomás), triggering dark developments.

== Cast ==
- Tamar Novas as Miguel
- Marina Salas as Alicia
- Iván Marcos as Tomás
- Annick Weerts as Marie
- Alban Petit as Philippe
- Mateo Medina as Álamo
- Vicente Vergara as Ibáñez
- Nur de Vega as Gabriel
- Andrea Guardiola as Merche

== Production ==
The film was produced by La Canica Films and Caminando la Película AIE alongside Mother Superior Films, and it had the participation of RTVE, Prime Video, and Aragón TV, and the backing from ICAA, Ayuntamiento de Madrid, and CreaSGR.

Cinematographer Javier Salmones shot the film in a 2.35:1 aspect ratio, using an Alexa 35 camera and Arri/Zeiss Master Anamorphics 28-180 mm lenses. The film was shot in Zaragoza, Los Monegros (including locations near Farlete and Monegrillo), and the Community of Madrid.

== Release ==
Distributed by Filmax, The Devil Within is set to be released theatrically in Spain on 6 March 2026.

== See also ==
- List of Spanish films of 2026
