= Monegros Desert =

Semi-desert in Spain

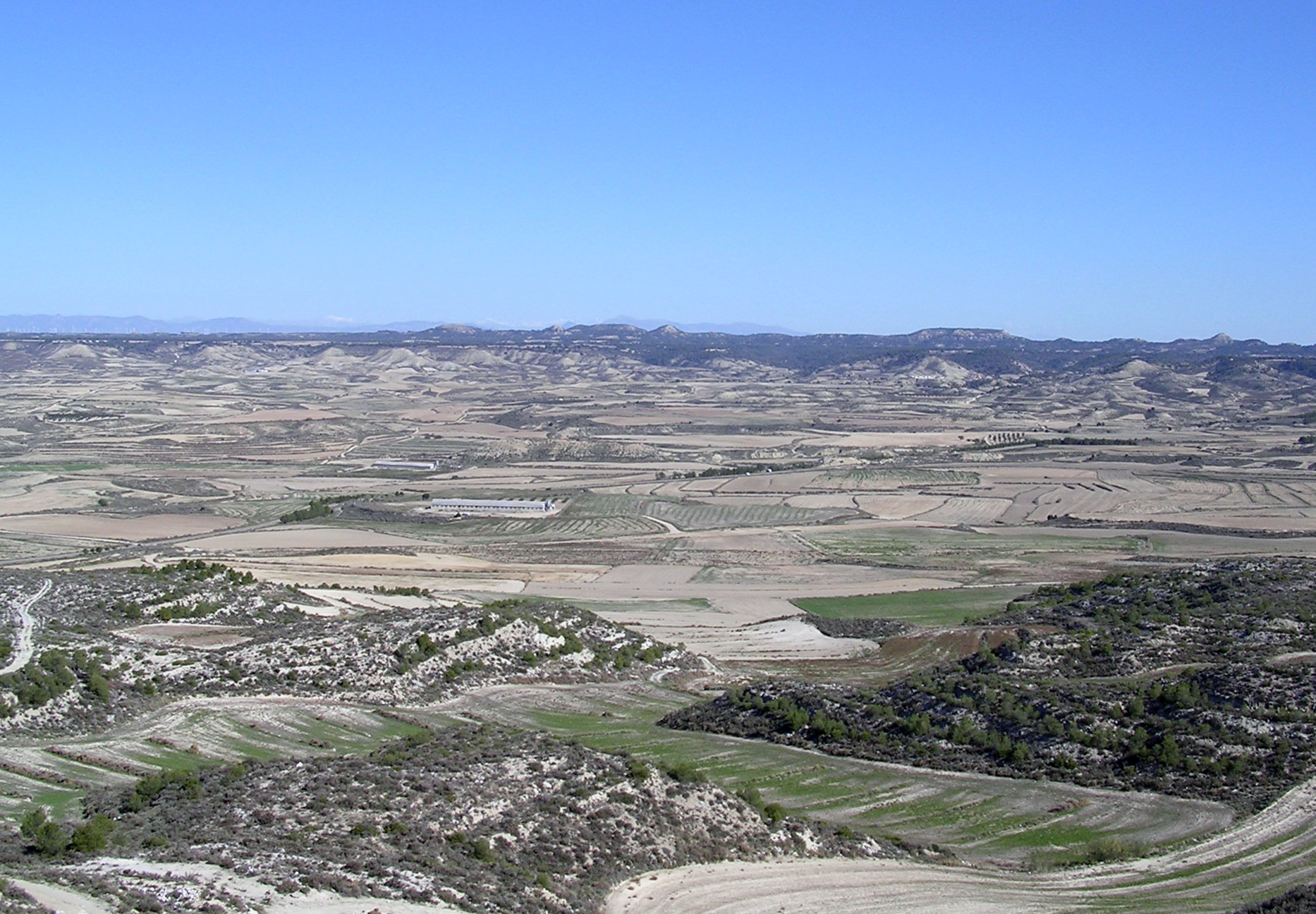
- Landscape of Monegros Desert

- Map of Aragon (in red) within Spain

Naming
- Native name: Desierto de los Monegros (Spanish)

Geography
- Country: Spain
- State: Aragon
- Coordinates: 41°38′N 0°11′W

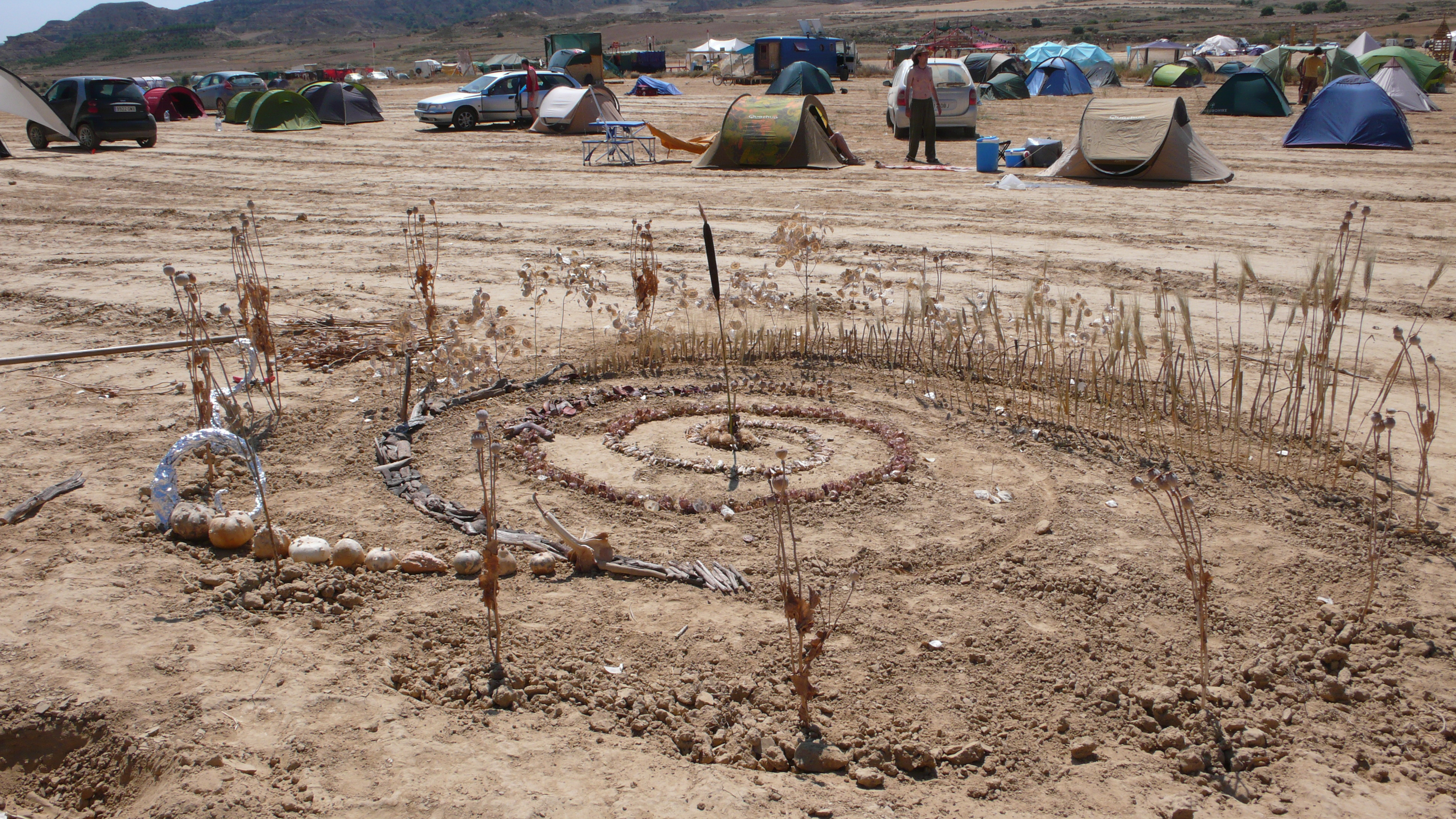
Monegros camp

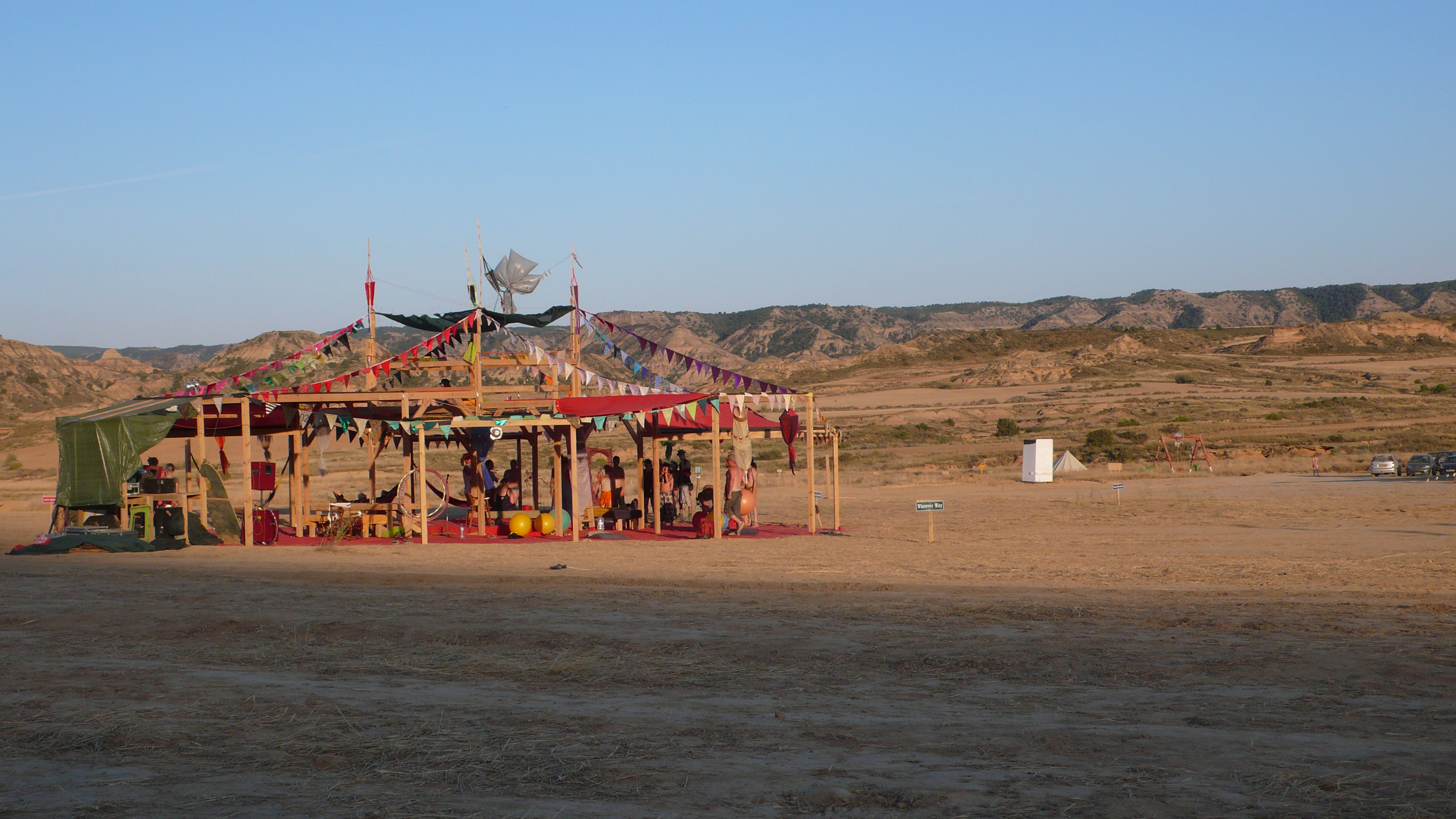

The Monegros Desert or Desierto de los Monegros is a semi-desert in Aragón, northeastern Spain, spanning the provinces of Zaragoza and Huesca. It is a semi-arid zone prone to frequent droughts. It is noted for its annual electronic music festival held in mid-July, the Monegros Festival.

== Geography ==
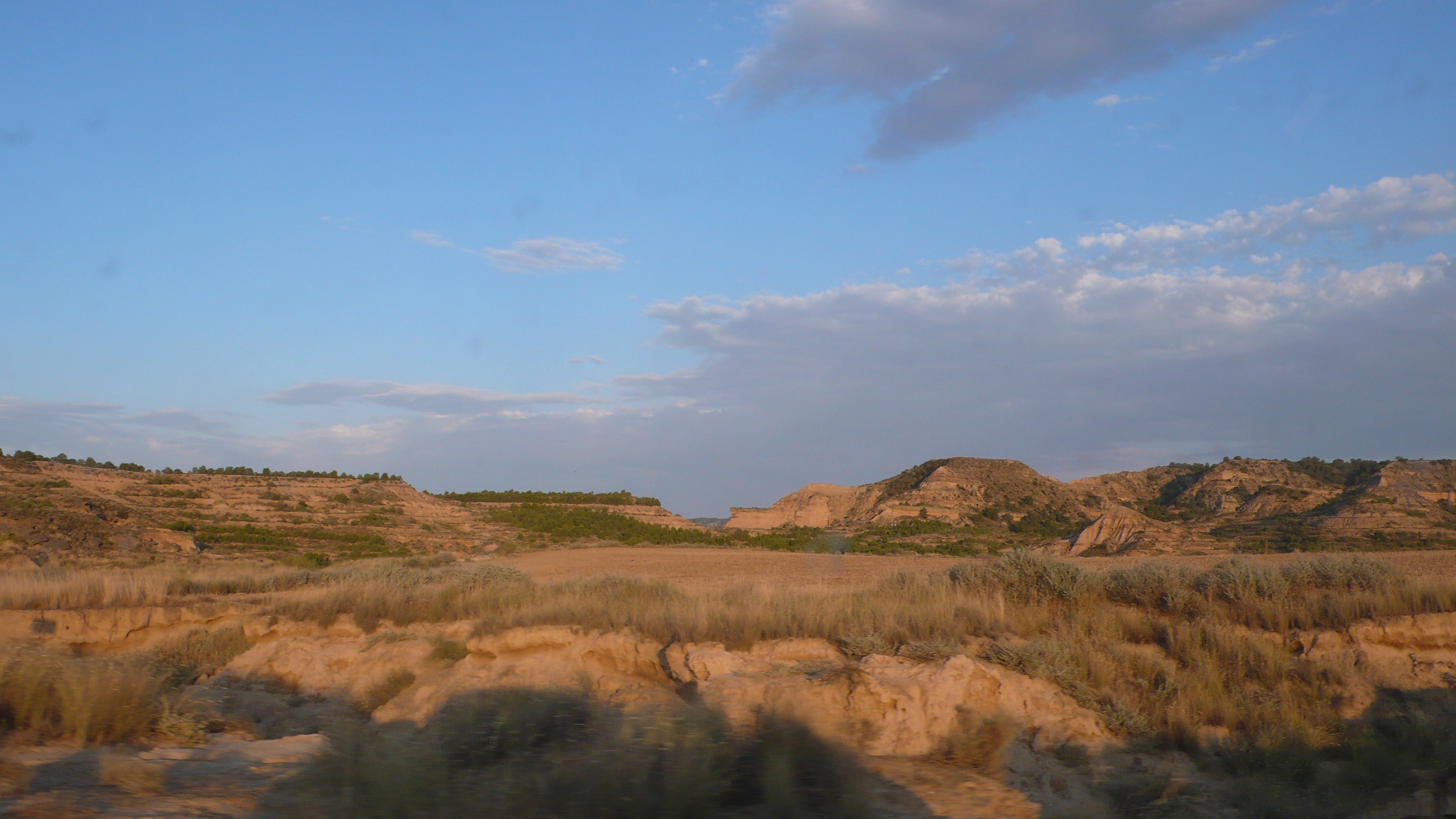
Monegros Desert

The Monegros Desert spans the provinces of Zaragoza and Huesca in the region of Aragón, including the comarca of Monegros in Huesca. Part of the desert lies in the Ebro Valley. The desert covers about 276,440 hectares (683,100 acres) and consists of 49 villages in 31 municipalities. The highest point of the Monegros Desert is Monte Oscuro, at an altitude of 822 metres (2,697 ft). Much of the landscape topography varies between 200 feet (61 m) and 300 feet (91 m) and is relatively flat semi-desert, with habitats of shrub-steppes prone to frequent droughts with high temperatures with hardly any rainfall (about 350 mm per year / 13.78 inches). Deserted farms and farm houses and juniperous woods are also seen in scattered locations.

== Flora and fauna ==
The environment requires plants that can endure salinity and dryness. Though the natural habitat of the region included shrub-steppe and juniper, cereal grasses have become replacements.

Lesser kestrel frequent the area; they nest in caves spread across 250 square kilometres (97 sq mi) of the Monegros Desert.

The area is protected as part of the Natura 2000 network. Two LIFE projects co‑financed by the European Commission have targeted the Monegros area, at least partially.

The Monegros Desert contains the proposed Los Monegros Protected Area, an area of biological interest due to its high number of endemic species and new discoveries. There are over 5,400 species in the area, according to a 1999 survey. However, the Government of Aragon has not decided to take measures to protect the area. Further research was performed in 2000, this time on the steppe elements of the Monegros biota.

=== Conservation ===
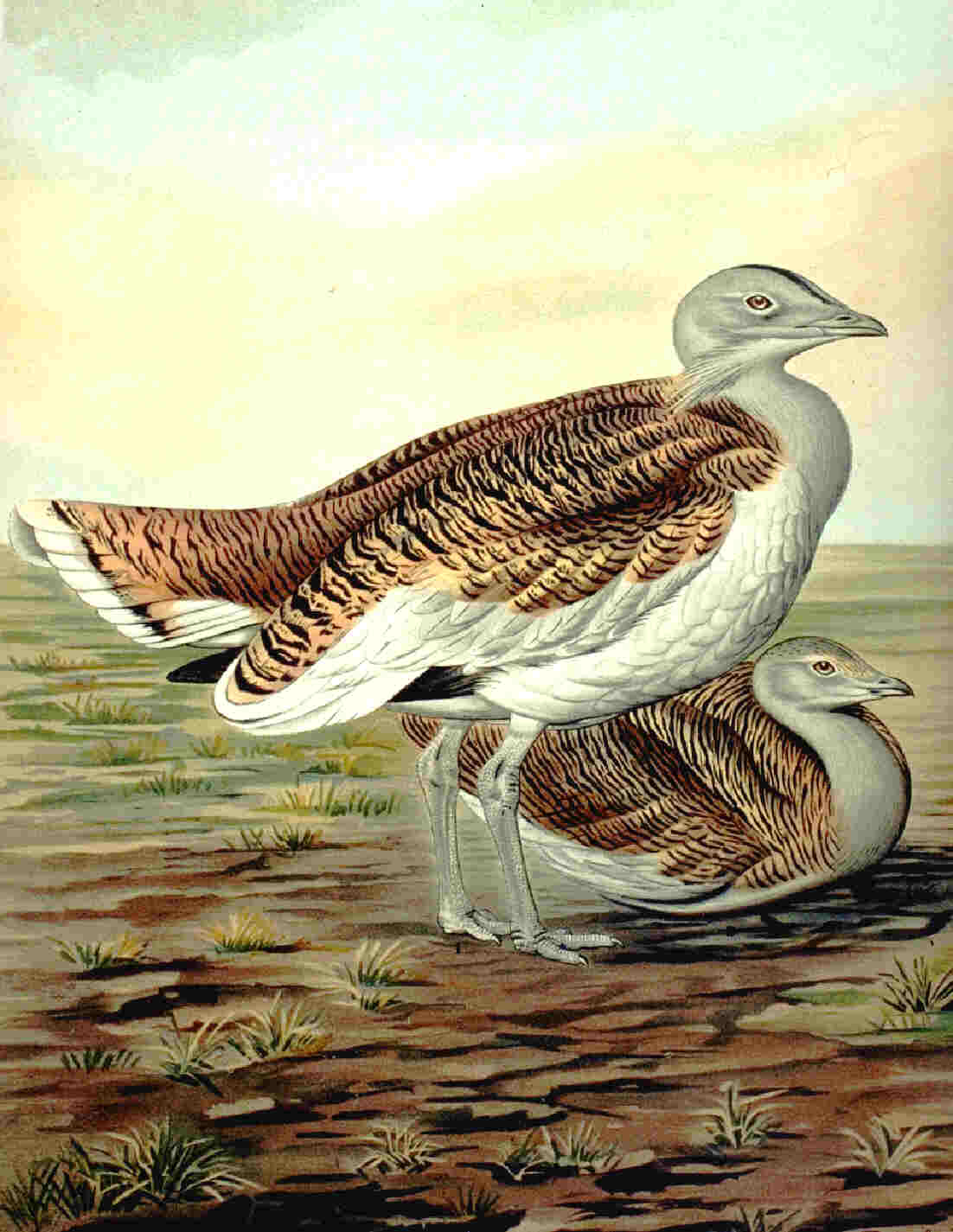
Sketch of the endangered great bustard

Conservation of the biodiversity in the steppe ecosystem of the Monegros of the Aragon region envisages habitat improvements for steppe birds and related plant life. Improvements in irrigation are planned. However the setting up of a casino may adversely affect conservation efforts.

The Aragon Steppes are cited as the largest habitat for bird communities in Spain. Highly endangered are great and little bustards, Eurasian stone-curlew, lesser kestrel, Montagu's harrier and Dupont's lark, as these species are directly threatened by changes in the steppe ecosystem. The endemic plant species, 45% of all plant species in Spain, are also under decline. A project supported by BirdLife International at the "Muelas del Jiloca" Special Protection Area has been launched to conserve the birds and plants.

== Economy ==
The area is sparsely populated. A large scale economic development called Gran Scala was projected in the region, with some 32 planned casinos, 70 hotels, 232 restaurants, 500 stores, a golf course, a race track and a bullring planned, despite the region suffering from water and oil issues. The main roads of access are the N-II and AP-2, and it is also connected by rail.

== Culture ==
=== Monegros Desert Festival ===
The Monegros Desert is noted for its Monegros Desert Festival, usually held in mid-July, attracting numerous Spaniards and internationally renowned DJs and bands and some 40,000 people to its electronic music performances annually. Formerly called the "Groove Parade" after being founded in 1992, it is held at the Finca Les Peñetes, roughly 18 kilometres (11 mi) west of Fraga, not far from Bujaraloz. It is held in a windowless, graffiti-filled hall called Flarida, with an area of some 3,000 square metres (32,000 sq ft).
