= Perdiguera =

Coordinates: 41°45′N 0°38′W

- municipality
- Flag Coat of arms
- Interactive map of Perdiguera
- Country: Spain
- Autonomous community: Aragon
- Province: Zaragoza
- Comarca: Monegros

Area
  - Total: 110 km^{2} (42 sq mi)

Population (2025-01-01)
  - Total: 559
  - Density: 5.1/km^{2} (13/sq mi)
- Time zone: UTC+1 (CET)
  - Summer (DST): UTC+2 (CEST)
- Website: www.perdiguera.es

Perdiguera is a municipality located in the province of Zaragoza, Aragon, Spain. According to the 2009 census (INE), the municipality has a population of 662 inhabitants.

The Sierra de Alcubierre rises east of the town.

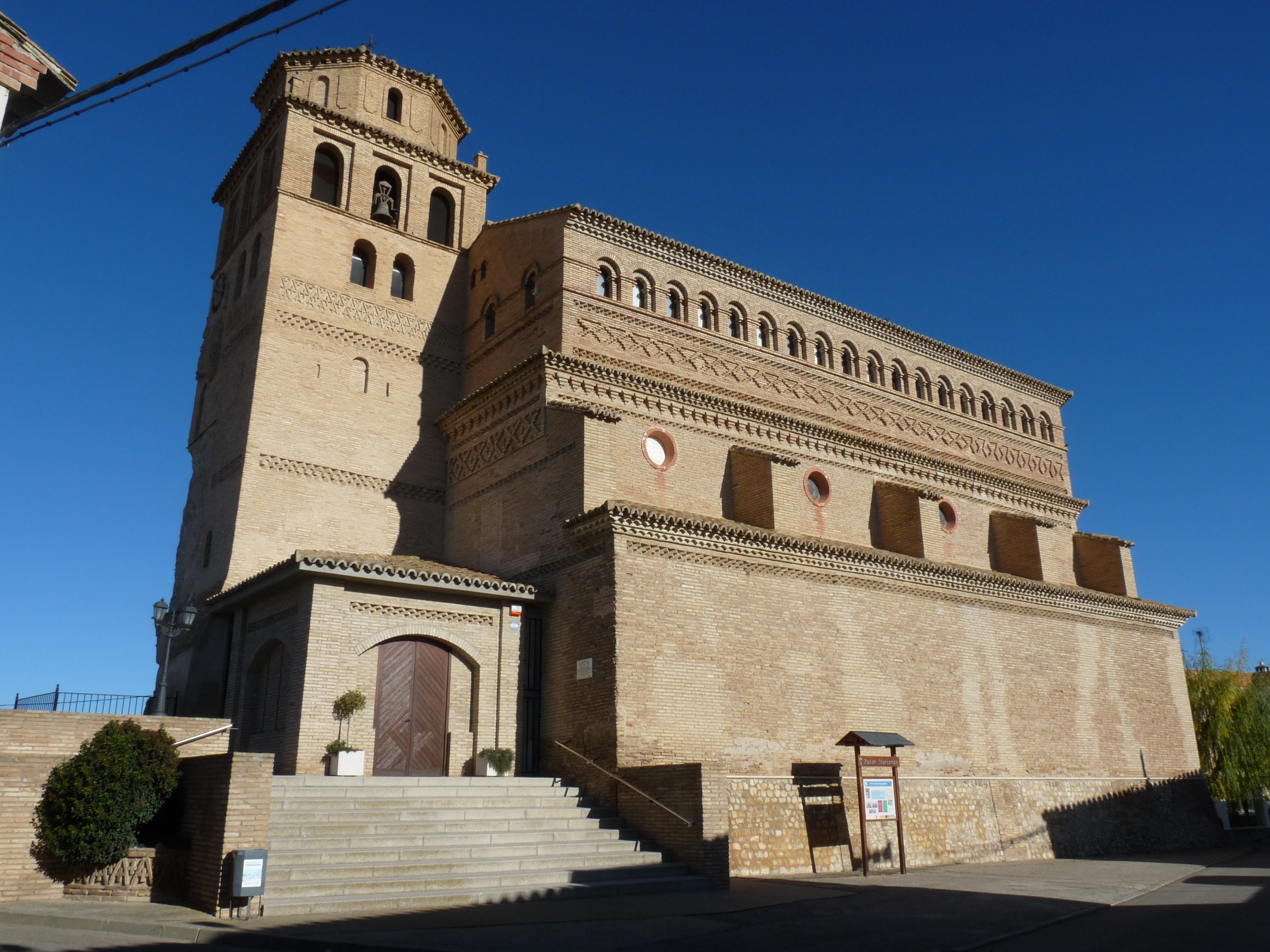
Church of Our Lady of the Assumption in Perdiguera

== See also ==
- List of municipalities in Zaragoza
