= Sangarrén =

- municipality
- Flag Coat of arms

- Location in Spain Sangarrén (Spain)
- Coordinates: 42°01′N 0°26′W
- Country: Spain
- Autonomous community: Aragon
- Province: Huesca
- Comarca: Monegros

Area
  - Total: 32 km^{2} (12 sq mi)

Population (2025)
  - Total: 233
  - Density: 7.3/km^{2} (19/sq mi)
- Time zone: UTC+1 (CET)
  - Summer (DST): UTC+2 (CEST)

Sangarrén is a municipality located in the province of Huesca, Aragon, Spain. According to the 2025 census (INE), the municipality has a population of 233 inhabitants.

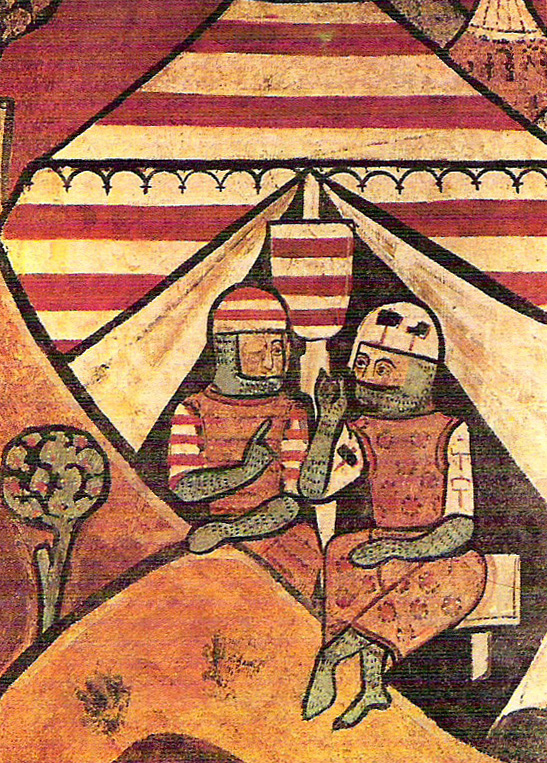
Hugh IV, count of Empúries, and Pero Maça, Lord of Sangarrén during the battle against the Moors in Mallorca around 1229.

== See also ==
- List of municipalities in Huesca
