= Tomás Martín =

Spanish actor

Tomás Martín, also known as 'Tomás Penco' (born November 20, 1970, in Mérida or Badajoz, Extremadura, Spain) is a Spanish actor.

He became famous in 1992 with the film Jamón, jamón by Bigas Luna, in which he and Javier Bardem present a naked bullfight with an erect penis. Tomas Penco continued his career under the name Tomás Martín.

He played the role of Alfredo Landa's son Nico in Antonio del Reals "Finally alone!"(¡Por fin solos!) in 1994. This was followed in 1995 by the role of Santiago in the series "Juntas pero no revoltas".

In 1998 Jasin starred in "The Far" by Manuel Balaguer Julià along with Cristina Brondo and Mathieu Carriere. He has several various characters in the program La hora de José Mota.

In addition, Tomás Martín played the role of Lorenzao in the series Arrayán for two years from 2011 to 2012.

== Filmography ==
1992: Jamón, jamón, dir. Bigas Luna

1993: The Mental Tenor, dir. Carlos Atanes

1993: El joven Picasso, dir. Juan Antonio Bardem

1994: Por fin solos, dir. Antonio del Real

1998: Ángelo muerto, dir. Emil Samper

1999: El far, dir. Manuel Balaguer Julià

2005: Sabah, dir. Fernando Vera

2011: Arrayán (TV series)
