= Albalatillo =

Coordinates: 41°44′N 0°09′W

Albalatillo Albalatiello
- municipality
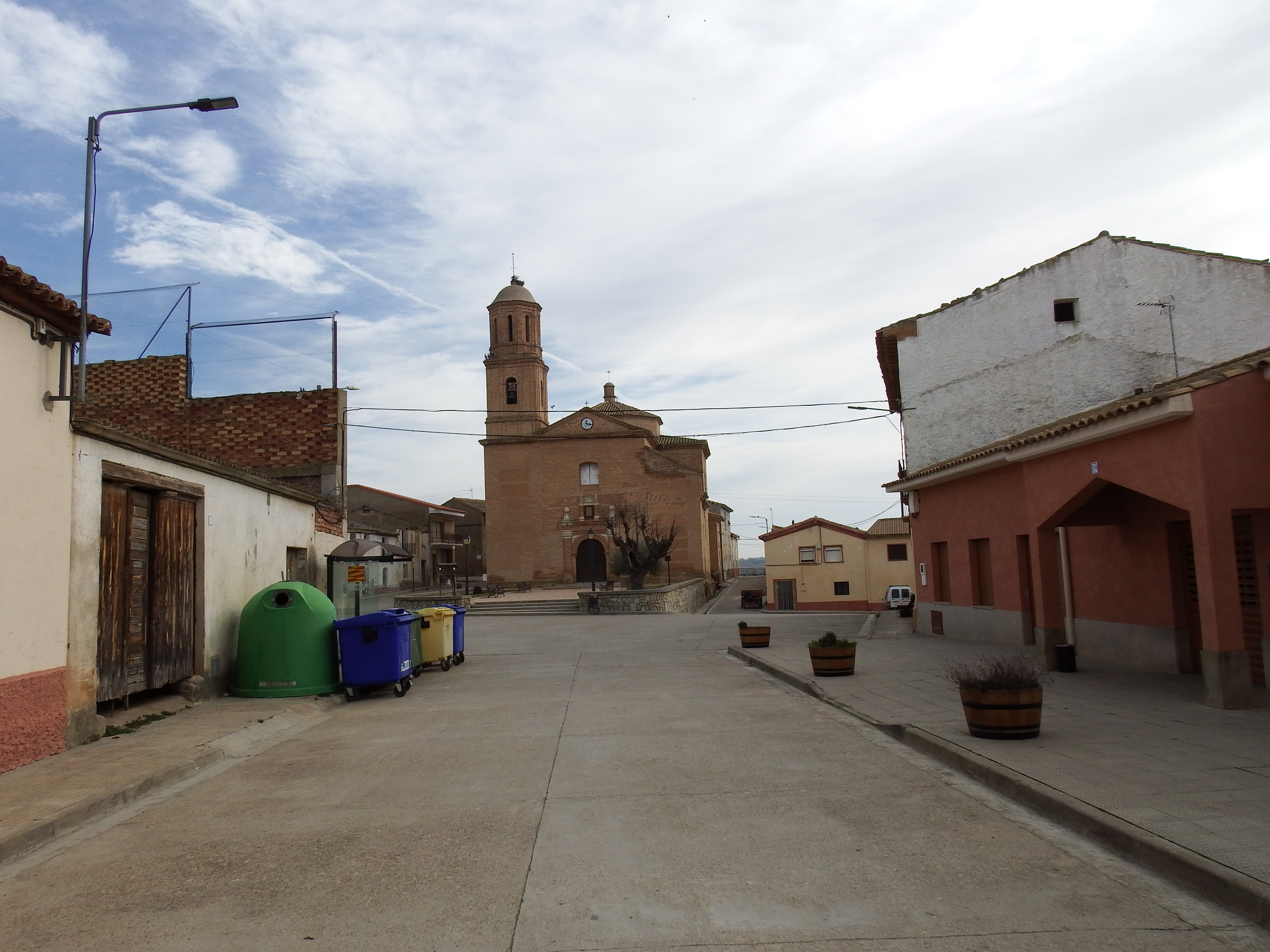

- Flag Coat of arms
- Interactive map of Albalatillo
- Country: Spain
- Autonomous community: Aragon
- Province: Huesca
- Comarca: Monegros

Area
  - Total: 8 km^{2} (3.1 sq mi)

Population (2025-01-01)
  - Total: 220
  - Density: 28/km^{2} (71/sq mi)
- Time zone: UTC+1 (CET)
  - Summer (DST): UTC+2 (CEST)

Albalatillo (Aragonese Albalatiello) is a municipality located in the province of Huesca, Aragon, Spain. According to the 2004 census (INE), the municipality has a population of 253 inhabitants.

== See also ==
- List of municipalities in Huesca
