= Barbués =

Barbués, Spain
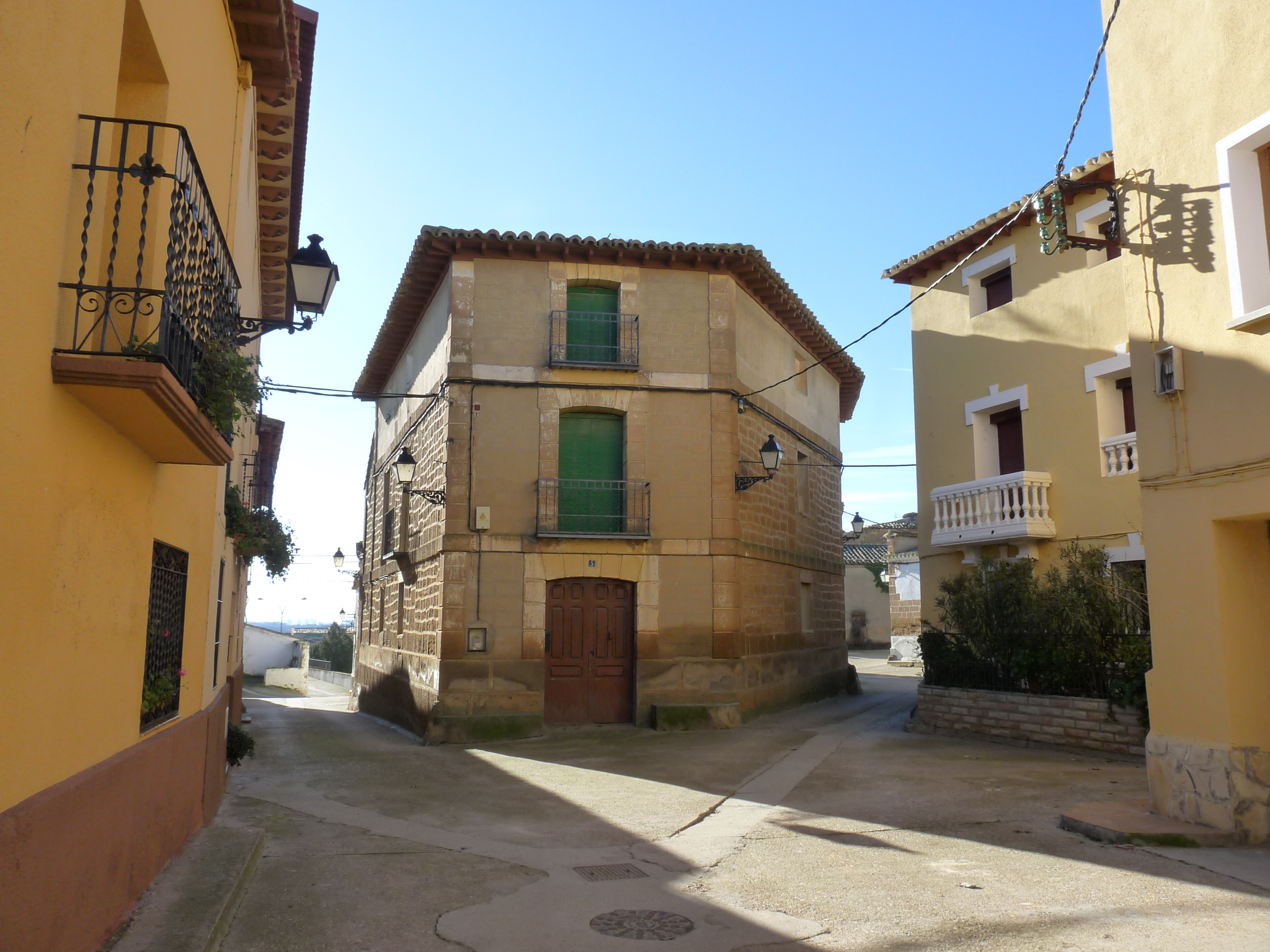

- Flag Coat of arms

- Location in Spain
- Coordinates: 41°59′N 0°25′W
- Country: Spain
- Autonomous community: Aragon
- Province: Huesca
- Comarca: Monegros

Government
  - Mayor: José Sinesio Bailo Castro (People's Party of Aragon)

Area
  - Total: 19 km^{2} (7.3 sq mi)
- Elevation: 361 m (1,184 ft)

Population (2025-01-01)
  - Total: 97
  - Density: 5.1/km^{2} (13/sq mi)
- Time zone: UTC+1 (CET)
  - Summer (DST): UTC+2 (CEST)
- Postal code: 22255

Barbués is a municipality located in the province of Huesca, Aragon, Spain. According to the 2004 census (INE), the municipality has a population of 108 inhabitants.

== See also ==
- List of municipalities in Huesca
