= Leciñena =

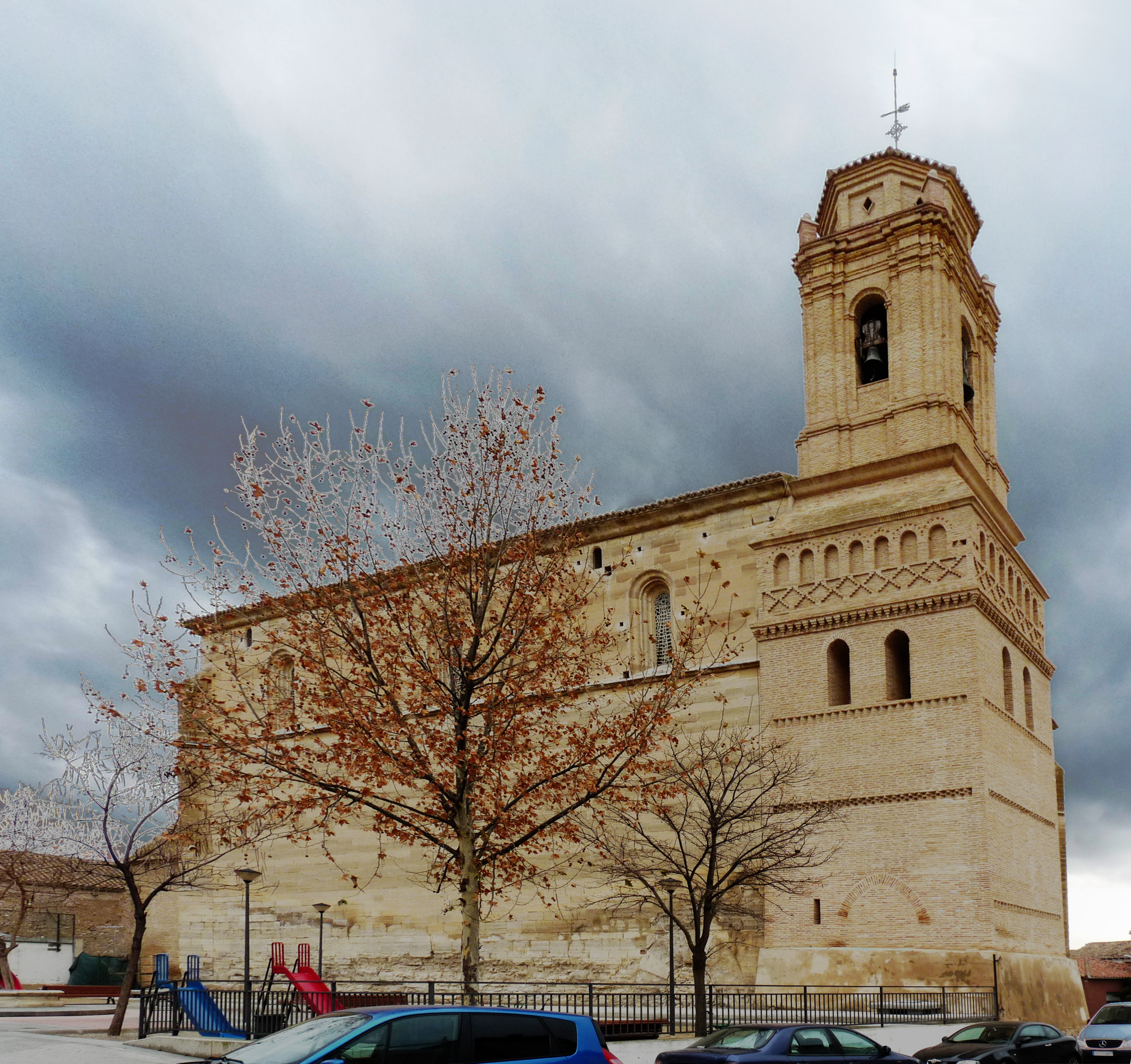

- Flag Coat of arms

- Location within Aragon Location within Spain Location within Europe
- Country: Spain
- Autonomous community: Aragon
- Province: Zaragoza
- Comarca: Monegros

Area
  - Total: 140 km^{2} (54 sq mi)
- Elevation: 415 m (1,362 ft)

Population (2025-01-01)
  - Total: 1,087
  - Density: 7.8/km^{2} (20/sq mi)
- Time zone: UTC+1 (CET)
  - Summer (DST): UTC+2 (CEST)

Leciñena is a municipality located in the province of Zaragoza, Aragon, Spain. According to the 2004 census (INE), the municipality had a population of 1,280.

The Sierra de Alcubierre rises east of the town.

== See also ==
- List of municipalities in Zaragoza
