= Sena, Aragon =

Coordinates: 41°42′56″N 00°02′37″W

Sena
- municipality
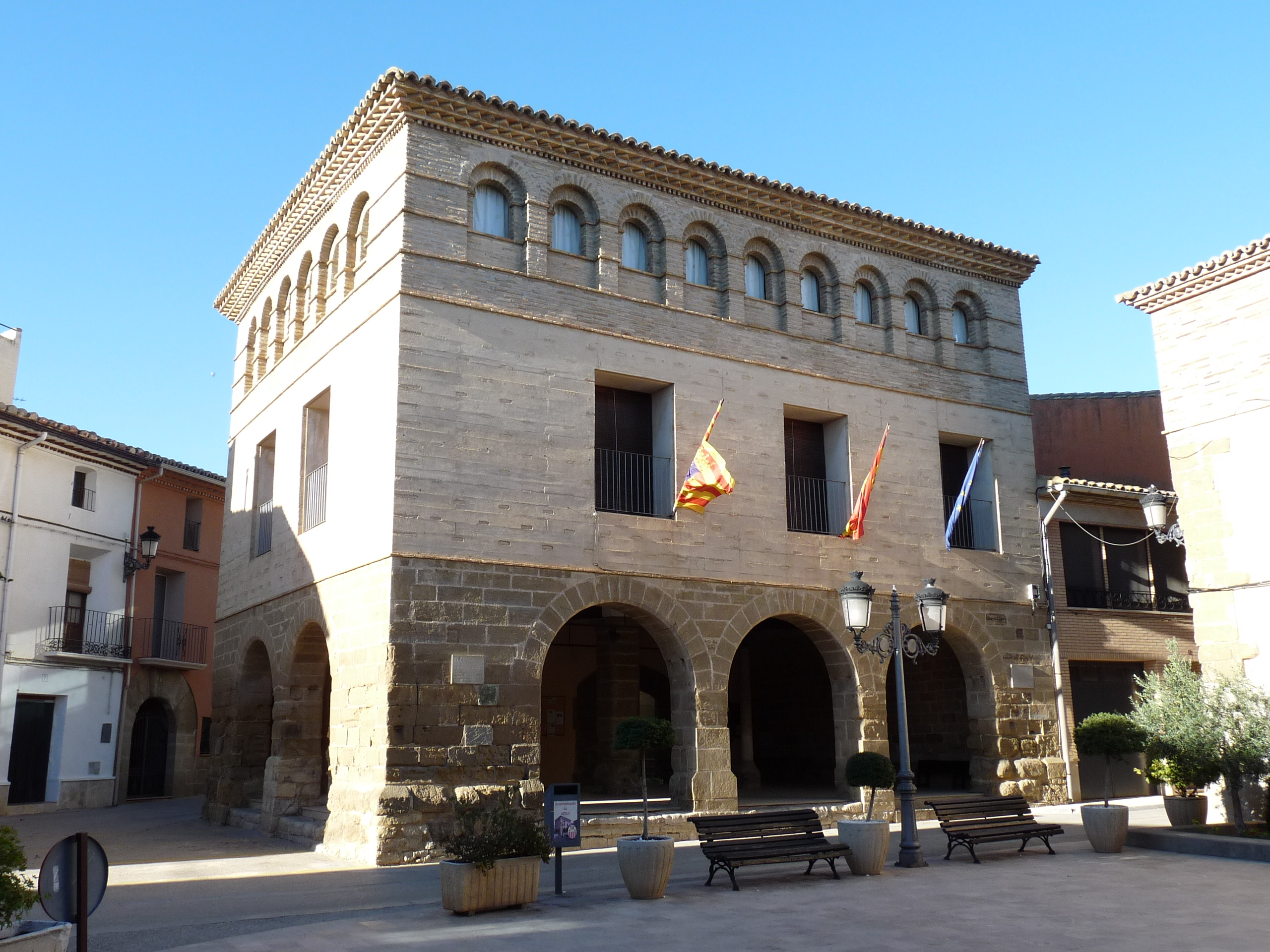
- Town hall from Sena (16th c.)

- Coat of arms
- Interactive map of Sena
- Country: Spain
- Autonomous community: Aragon
- Province: Huesca
- Comarca: Monegros

Area
  - Total: 104.7 km^{2} (40.4 sq mi)
- Elevation: 221 m (725 ft)

Population (2025-01-01)
  - Total: 490
- Demonym: Senense or Senero / Senera
- Time zone: UTC+1 (CET)
  - Summer (DST): UTC+2 (CEST)

Stone age sites in Aragon. Nr. 17 is an archaeological site near Sena

Sena is a municipality located in the Monegros comarca province of Huesca, Aragon, Spain. According to the 2018 census, the municipality has a population of 489 inhabitants.

There is a Stone Age archaeological site at a place known as "Monte Alto de Sena" located within Sena's municipal term.

== See also ==
- List of municipalities in Huesca
