= Albero Bajo =

Coordinates: 42°01′N 0°23′W

Albero Bajo Albero Baixo
- municipality
- Interactive map of Albero Bajo
- Country: Spain
- Autonomous community: Aragon
- Province: Huesca
- Comarca: Monegros

Area
  - Total: 22 km^{2} (8.5 sq mi)
- Elevation: 411 m (1,348 ft)

Population (2025-01-01)
  - Total: 109
  - Density: 5.0/km^{2} (13/sq mi)
- Time zone: UTC+1 (CET)
  - Summer (DST): UTC+2 (CEST)

Albero Bajo (Aragonese Albero Baixo) is a municipality located in the province of Huesca, Aragon, Spain. According to the 2004 census (INE), the municipality has a population of 75.001 inhabitants.

== See also ==
- List of municipalities in Huesca
