= Almuniente =

Coordinates: 41°57′N 0°24′W

Almuniente Almunient
- municipality
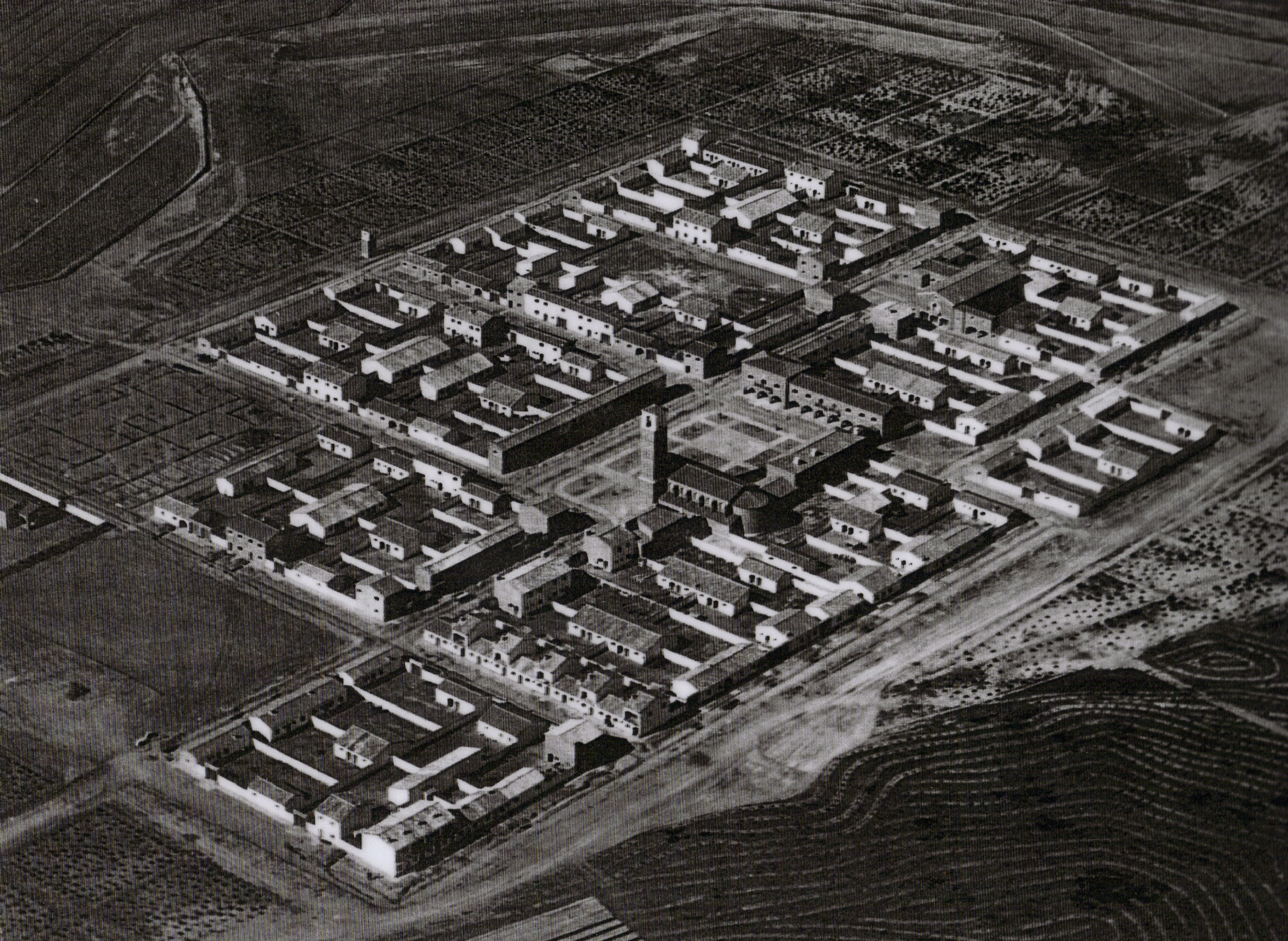

- Flag Coat of arms
- Interactive map of Almuniente
- Country: Spain
- Autonomous community: Aragon
- Province: Huesca
- Municipality: Almuniente

Area
  - Total: 37 km^{2} (14 sq mi)

Population (2025-01-01)
  - Total: 448
  - Density: 12/km^{2} (31/sq mi)
- Time zone: UTC+1 (CET)
  - Summer (DST): UTC+2 (CEST)

Almuniente (Aragonese Almunient) is a municipality located in the province of Huesca, Aragon, Spain. According to the 2004 census (INE), the municipality has a population of 571 inhabitants.

== See also ==
- List of municipalities in Huesca
