= Castelflorite =

Coordinates: 41°48′N 0°01′W

Castelflorite Castiflorit
- municipality
- Coat of arms
- Interactive map of Castelflorite
- Country: Spain
- Autonomous community: Aragon
- Province: Huesca

Area
  - Total: 34 km^{2} (13 sq mi)

Population (2025-01-01)
  - Total: 102
  - Density: 3.0/km^{2} (7.8/sq mi)
- Time zone: UTC+1 (CET)
  - Summer (DST): UTC+2 (CEST)

Castelflorite (Aragonese Castiflorit) is a municipality located in the province of Huesca, Aragon, Spain. According to the 2004 census (INE), the municipality has a population of 128 inhabitants.

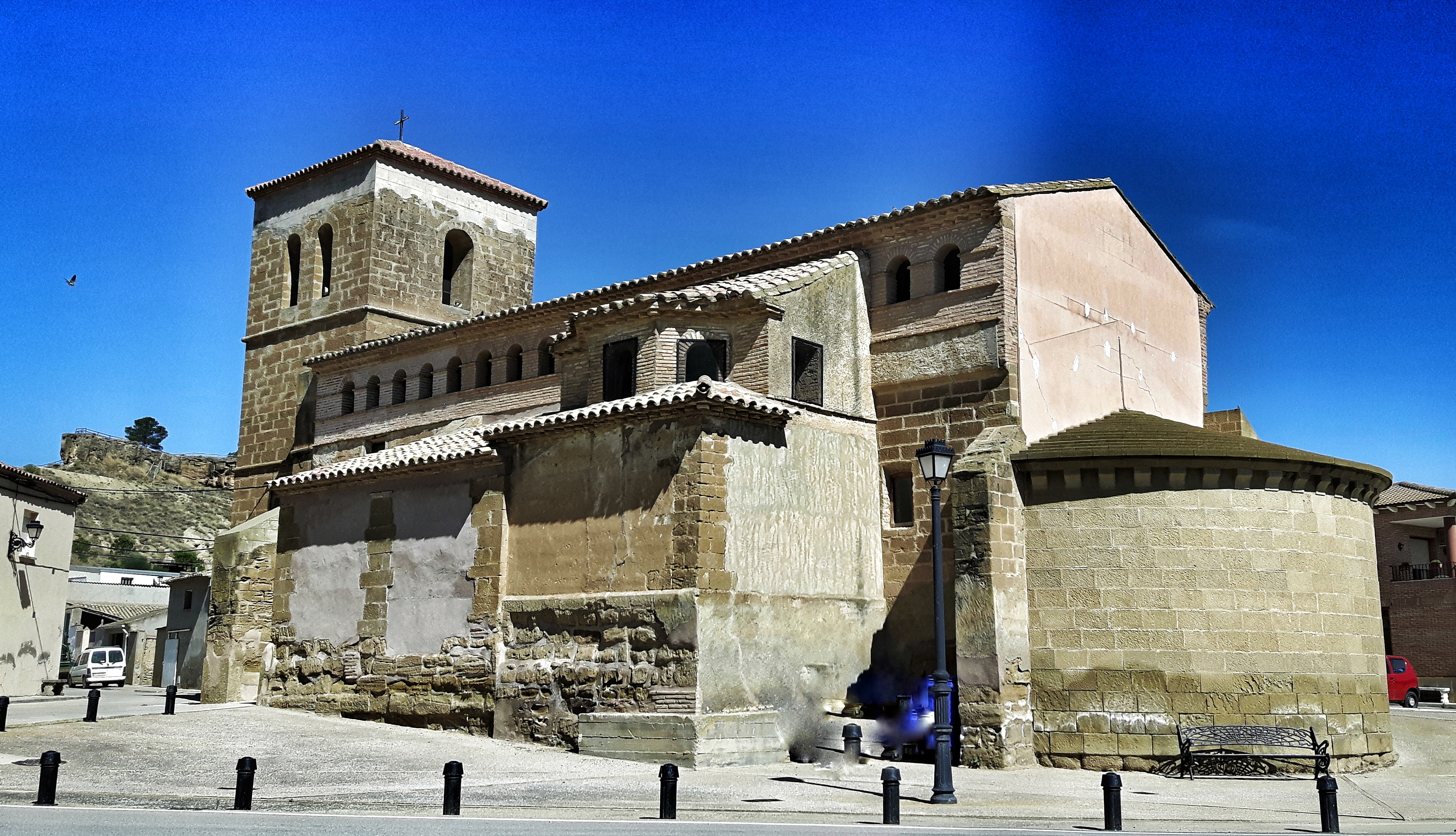
Church of Castelflorite, Huesca

== See also ==
- List of municipalities in Huesca
