= Gran Scala =

- Location: Ontinena, Aragon, Spain
- Opened: 2012
- Owner: International Leisure Development
- Area: 6,670 acres (2,700 ha)
- Website: www.ild-plc.com

Gran Scala was a huge European project to build a "destination city of leisure for all ages" on a 2,700-hectare (6,700-acre) site in the desert of Los Monegros, near Ontiñena, in the province of Huesca, Spain. The project included the construction of 32 casinos, 70 hotels, five theme parks and a town of 100,000 inhabitants. Opening was planned for mid-2012.

== Development ==
While being a private investment project by a consortium called ILD (International Leisure Development), it has backing of the Aragonese government which is providing the construction of all necessary connecting infrastructure. ILD is looking to attract different investors of the hotel, gaming, and leisure industry to develop the facilities.

The project schedule, proposed by ILD, has construction work beginning in September 2008, just after the Zaragoza 2008 International Exhibition. A first opening would take place around mid-2010.

As of 2015, no development has taken place and the project appears to be one of many in Spain that failed after the 2008 financial crisis left its mark very heavily in that country.

== Criticism ==
A large majority of the Aragonese population supported the project. However, it was facing criticism from ecological lobby groups for its construction on one of the richest and most delicate ecosystems in the European continent and its survival was incompatible with a development of this scale and nature. The project was highly controversial not only because of the environmental impact that it would have on the ecosystem but also because of its large size, promoting luxury activities such as betting money, and massive consumption. Moreover, an aquatic theme park was planned in an area where drought is common and water is limited.
