= Alcubierre =

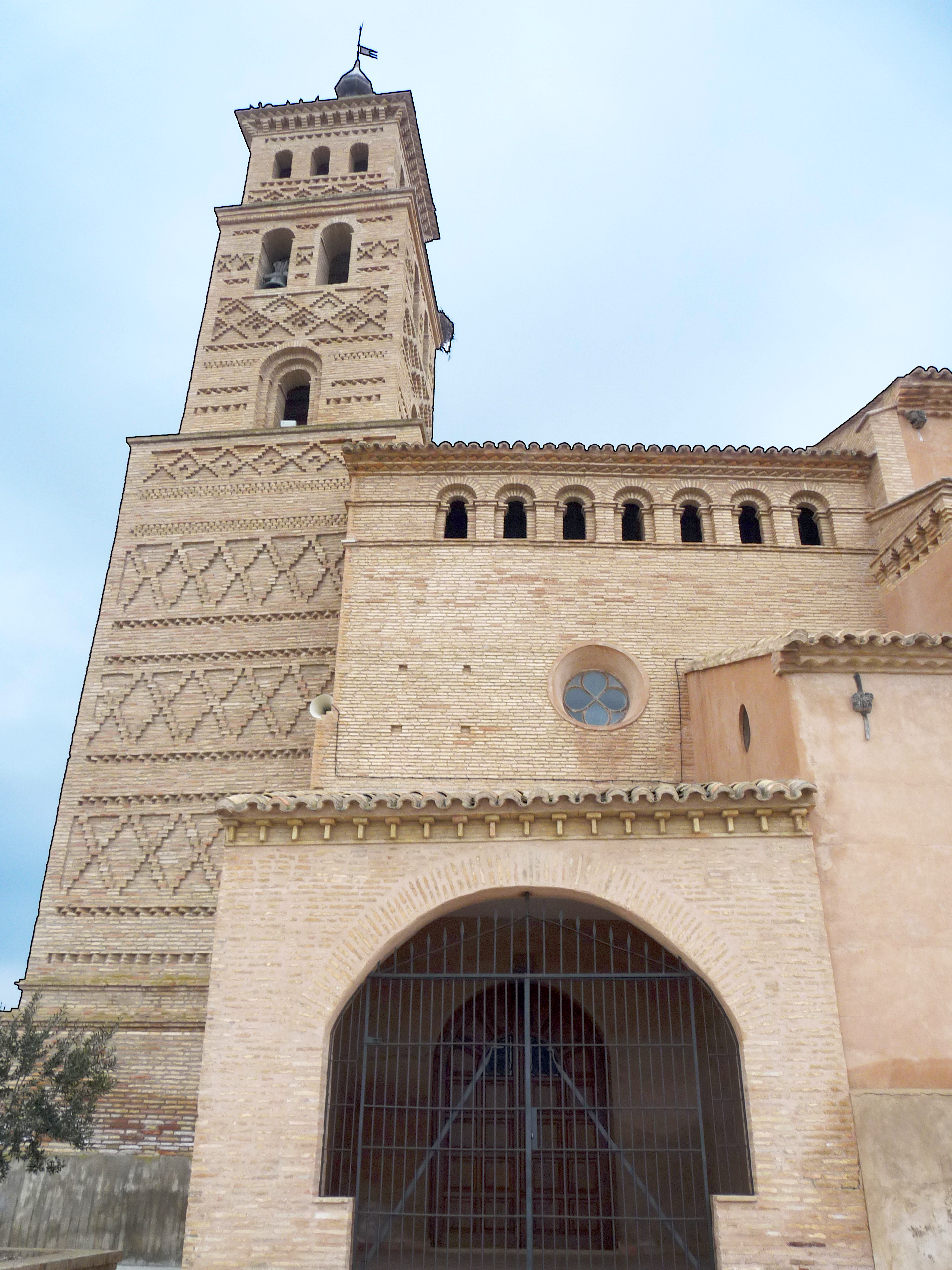

- Flag Coat of arms

- Location within Aragon Location within Spain
- Coordinates: 41°48′N 0°27′W
- Country: Spain
- Autonomous community: Aragon
- Province: Huesca
- Comarca: Los Monegros

Government
  - Mayor: Álvaro Isidro Amador Lacambra (PSOE-Aragón)

Area
  - Total: 115 km^{2} (44 sq mi)
- Elevation: 466 m (1,529 ft)

Population (2025-01-01)
  - Total: 401
  - Density: 3.49/km^{2} (9.03/sq mi)
- Time zone: UTC+1 (CET)
  - Summer (DST): UTC+2 (CEST)

Alcubierre is a municipality located in the province of Huesca, Aragon, Spain. According to the 2004 census (INE), the municipality has a population of 439 inhabitants.

This town gives its name to the Sierra de Alcubierre (highest point 822 m) that rises in the west, about 3 km away.

== See also ==
- List of municipalities in Huesca

== External links and further reading ==
- Chapter 2 Homage to Catalonia by George Orwell (archived link)
