= Valfarta =

Coordinates: 41°33′N 0°08′W

- municipality
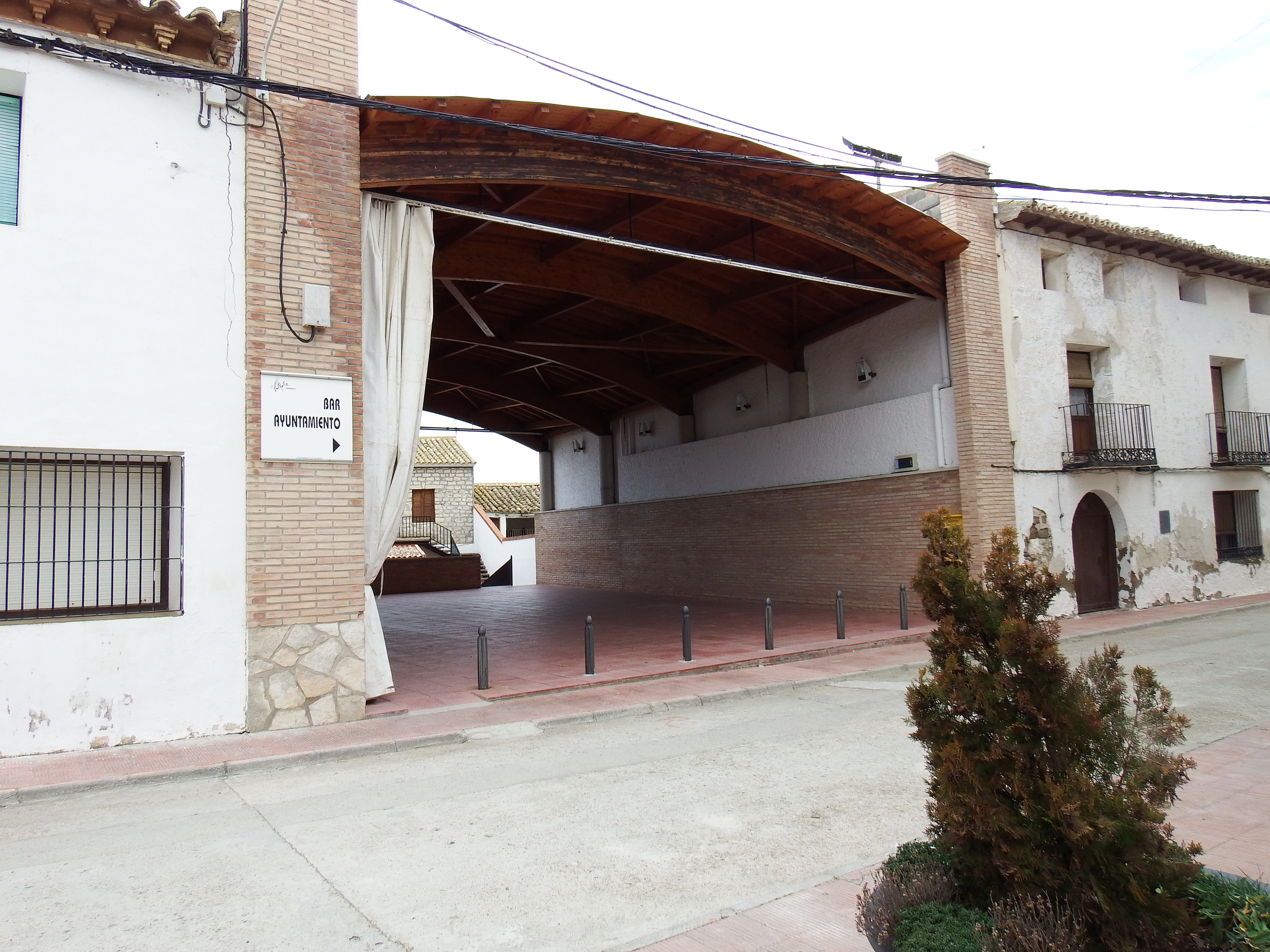
- Town hall

- Coat of arms
- Interactive map of Valfarta
- Country: Spain
- Autonomous community: Aragon
- Province: Huesca

Area
  - Total: 33 km^{2} (13 sq mi)

Population (2025-01-01)
  - Total: 54
  - Density: 1.6/km^{2} (4.2/sq mi)
- Time zone: UTC+1 (CET)
  - Summer (DST): UTC+2 (CEST)

Valfarta is a municipality located in the province of Huesca, Aragon, Spain. According to the 2004 census (INE), the municipality has a population of 91 inhabitants.

== See also ==
- List of municipalities in Huesca
