= Castejón de Monegros =

Municipality in Huesca, Aragon, Spain

Coordinates: 41°37′N 0°15′W

Castejón de Monegros, Spain Castillón de Monegros
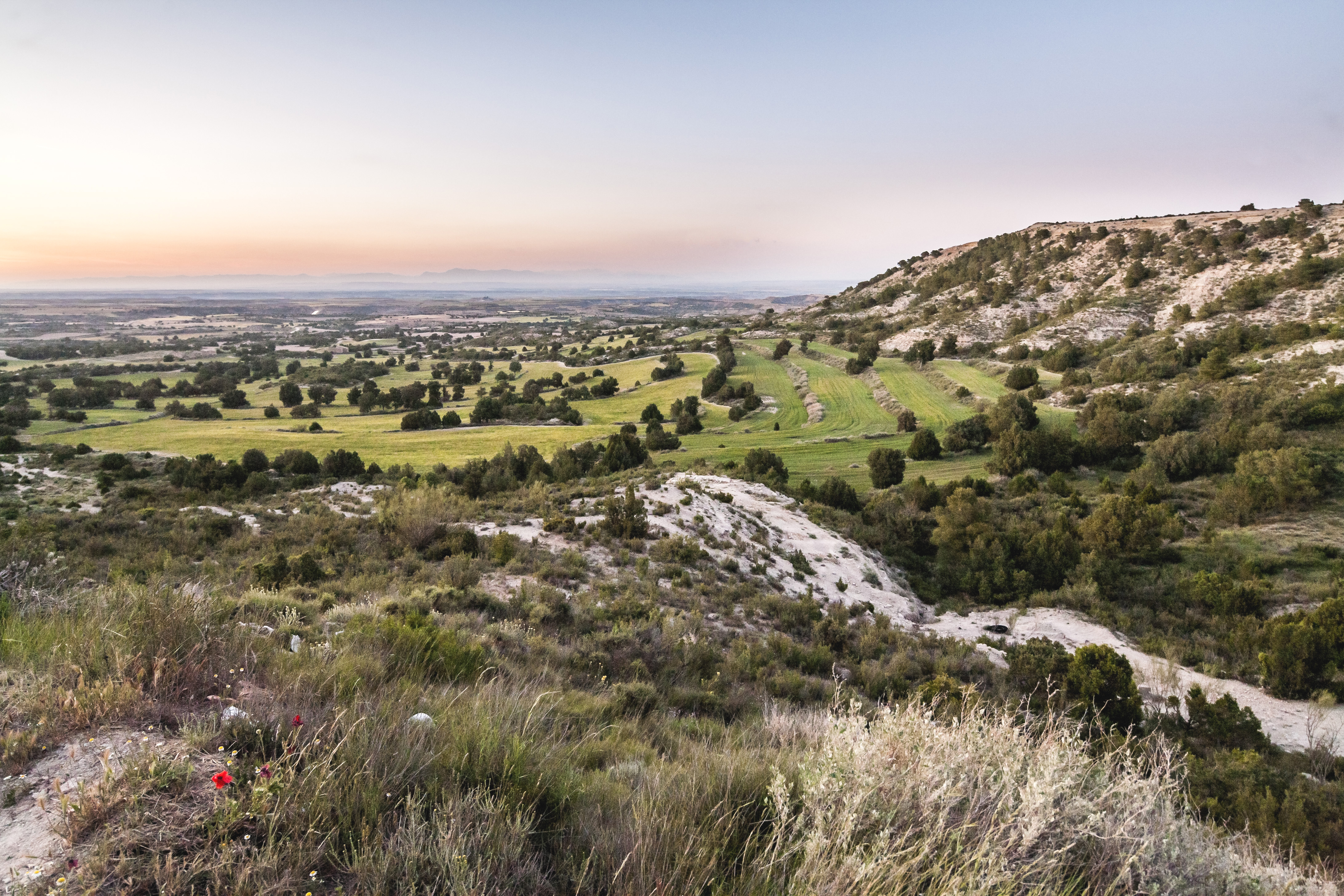

- Coat of arms
- Interactive map of Castejón de Monegros, Spain
- Country: Spain
- Autonomous community: Aragon
- Province: Huesca
- Municipality: Castejón de Monegros

Area
  - Total: 165 km^{2} (64 sq mi)

Population (2025-01-01)
  - Total: 459
  - Density: 2.78/km^{2} (7.20/sq mi)
- Time zone: UTC+1 (CET)
  - Summer (DST): UTC+2 (CEST)

Castejón de Monegros (Aragonese: Castillón de Monegros) is a municipality located in the province of Huesca, Aragon, Spain. According to the 2004 census (INE), the municipality has a population of 683 inhabitants.

== See also ==
- List of municipalities in Huesca
