= Poleñino =

Coordinates: 41°52′N 0°19′W

Poleñino, Spain
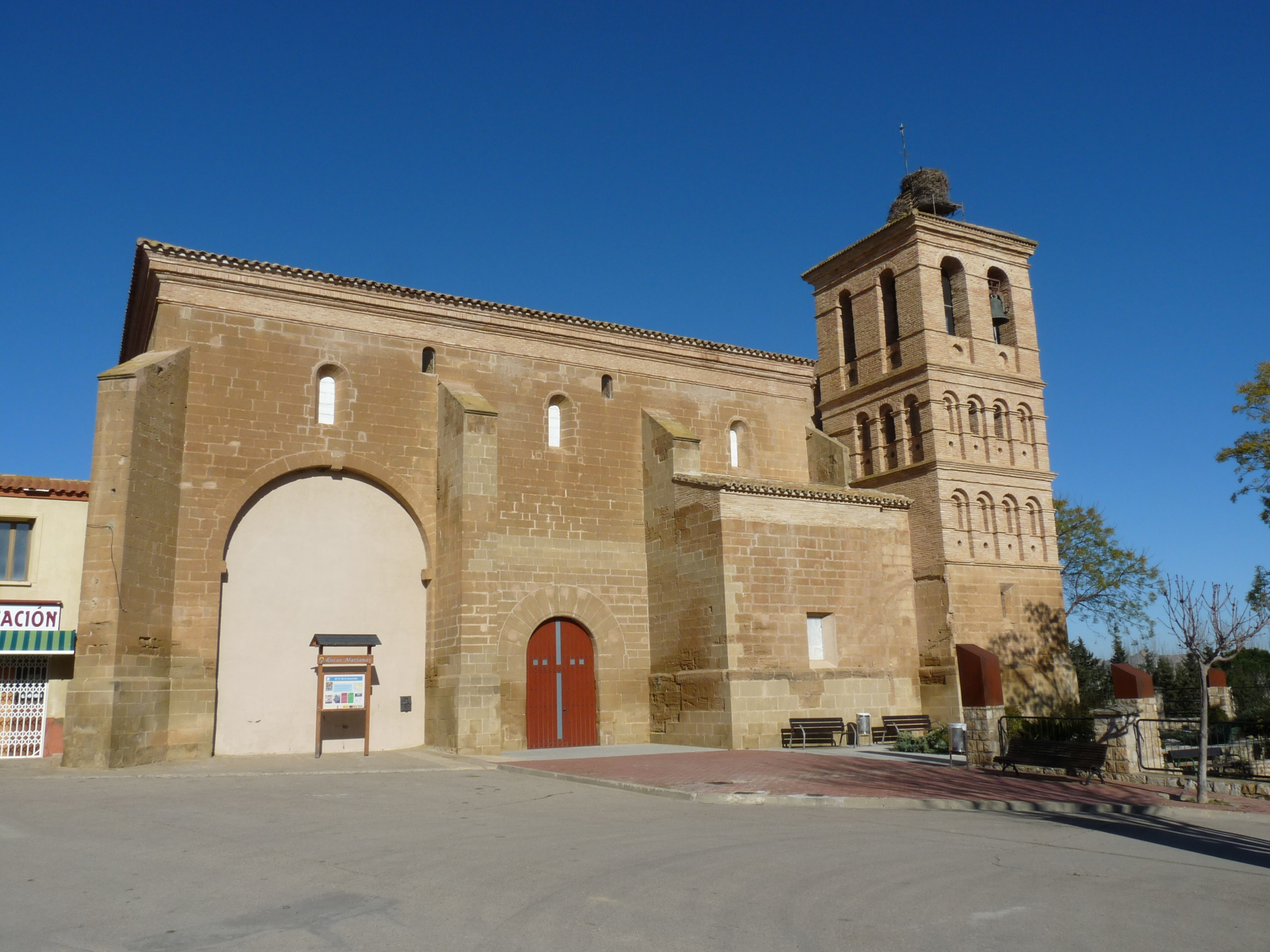
- Church of the Assumption (12th to 16th c.)

- Coat of arms
- Interactive map of Poleñino, Spain
- Country: Spain
- Autonomous community: Aragon
- Province: Huesca
- Municipality: Poleñino

Area
  - Total: 33 km^{2} (13 sq mi)

Population (2025-01-01)
  - Total: 184
  - Density: 5.6/km^{2} (14/sq mi)
- Time zone: UTC+1 (CET)
  - Summer (DST): UTC+2 (CEST)

Poleñino is a municipality located in the province of Huesca, Aragon, Spain. According to the 2004 census (INE), the municipality has a population of 256 inhabitants.

During the Spanish Civil War a field hospital was installed by the British Medical Aid Unit in the building previously used as the village's cultural centre (Casa del Pueblo), owing to its proximity to the front line at Huesca. A diary was kept by Agnes Hodgson, an Australian nurse who worked at the hospital in 1937, providing a detailed account of conditions there. When she arrived back in Australia she told a reporter: “Never have I seen such dreadful wounds and suffering as those that result from warfare. What I have seen in Spain has made me a militant pacifist for ever.”

== See also ==
- List of municipalities in Huesca
