= Torres de Barbués =

Coordinates: 41°58′N 0°26′W

Torres de Barbués, Spain
- Flag Coat of arms
- Interactive map of Torres de Barbués, Spain
- Country: Spain
- Autonomous community: Aragon
- Province: Huesca
- Municipality: Torres de Barbués

Area
  - Total: 13 km^{2} (5.0 sq mi)

Population (2025-01-01)
  - Total: 271
  - Density: 21/km^{2} (54/sq mi)
- Time zone: UTC+1 (CET)
  - Summer (DST): UTC+2 (CEST)

Torres de Barbués is a municipality located in the province of Huesca, Aragon, Spain. According to the 2004 census (INE), the municipality has a population of 335 inhabitants.

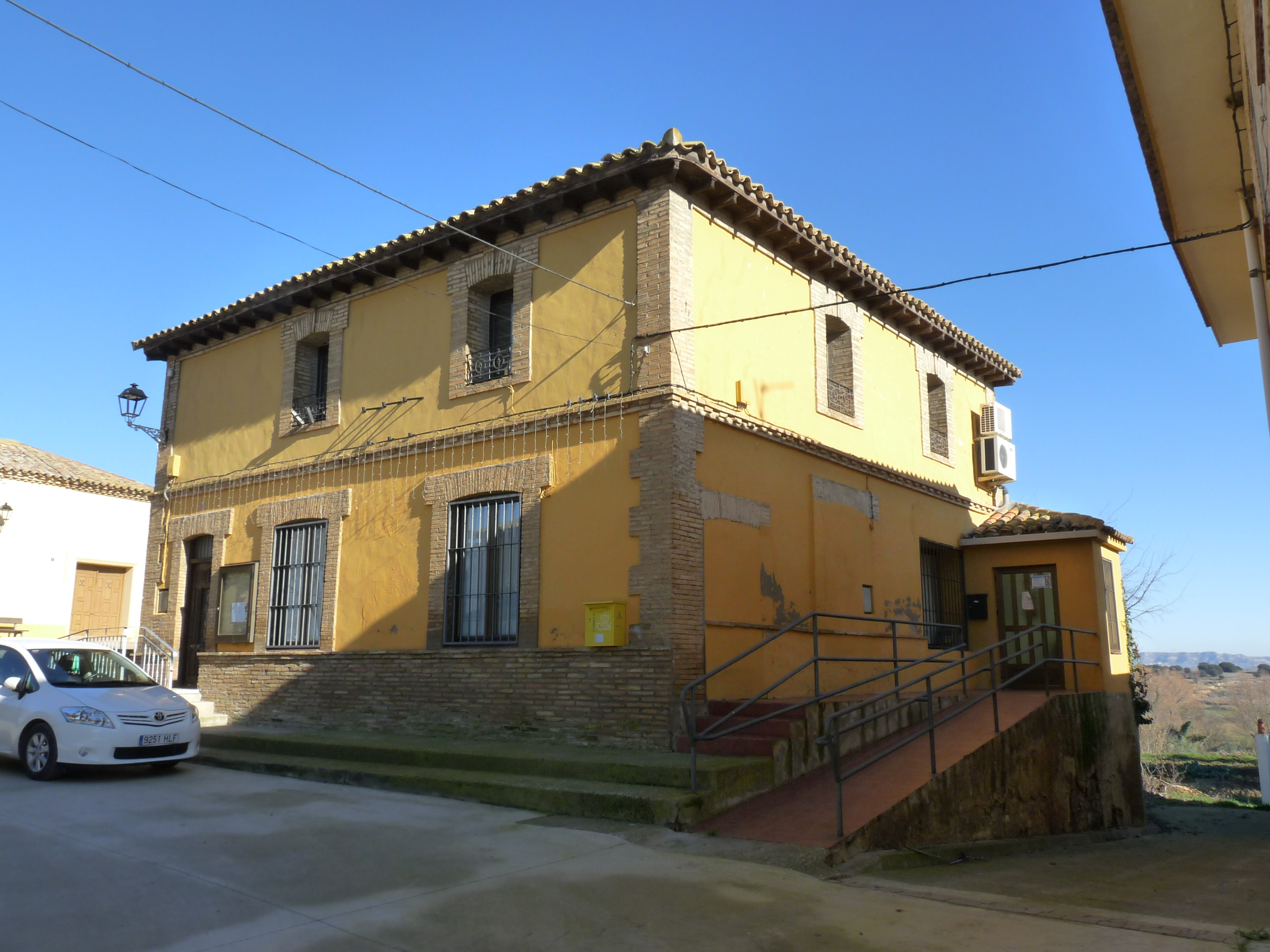
Torres de Barbués Town Hall Building

== See also ==
- List of municipalities in Huesca
