= Monegrillo =

Coordinates: 41°38′N 0°25′W

- municipality
- Flag Coat of arms
- Interactive map of Monegrillo
- Country: Spain
- Autonomous community: Aragon
- Province: Zaragoza
- Comarca: Monegros

Area
  - Total: 183 km^{2} (71 sq mi)

Population (2025-01-01)
  - Total: 378
  - Density: 2.07/km^{2} (5.35/sq mi)
- Time zone: UTC+1 (CET)
  - Summer (DST): UTC+2 (CEST)

Monegrillo is a municipality located in the province of Zaragoza, Aragon, Spain. According to the 2009 census (INE), the town has a population of 495 inhabitants. The Postal Code is 50164

The Sierra de Alcubierre rises east of the town.

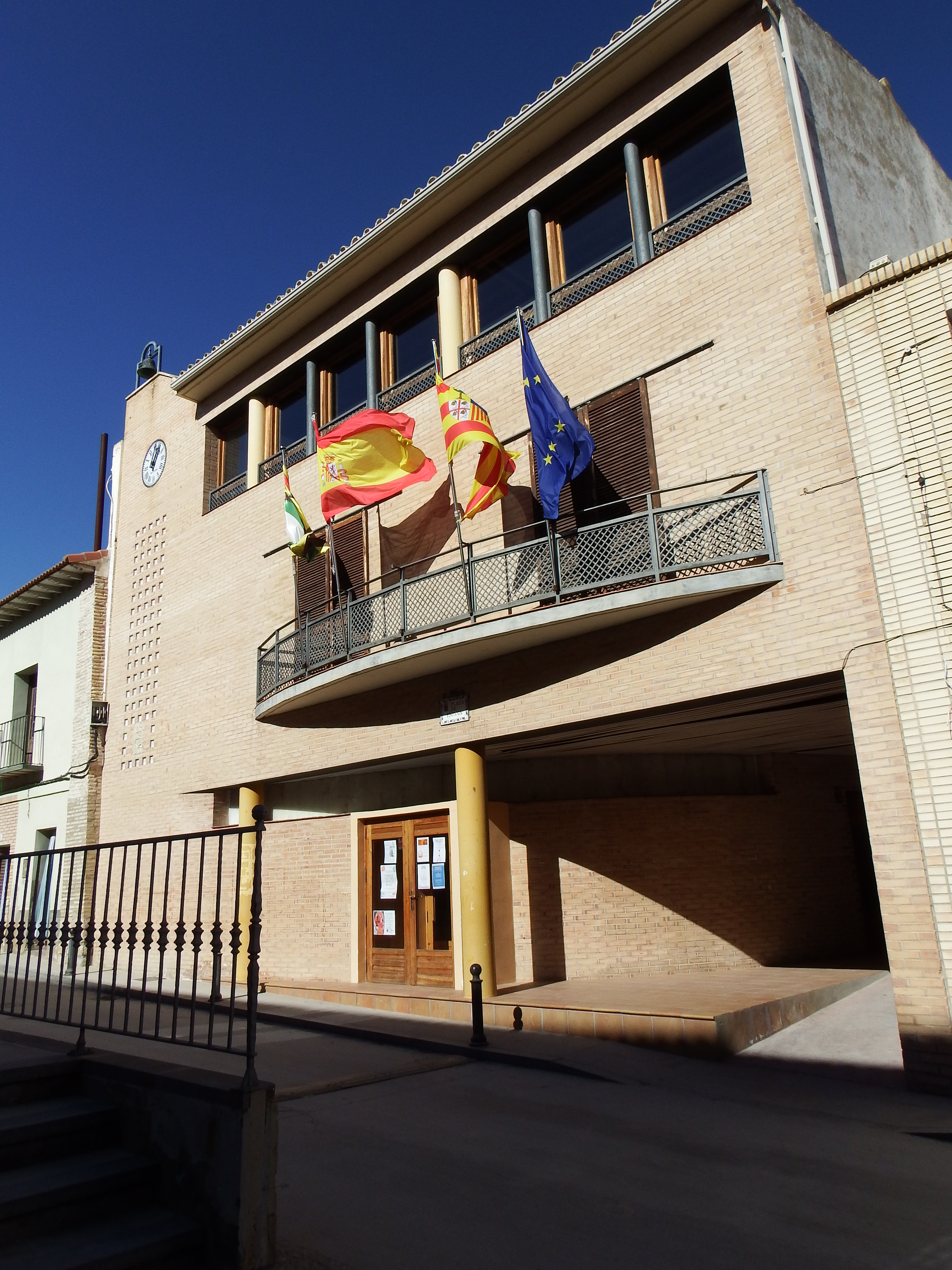
Monegrillo Town Hall

== See also ==
- List of municipalities in Zaragoza
