= Capdesaso =

Coordinates: 41°51′N 0°11′W

Capdesaso Cabosaso
- municipality
- Flag Coat of arms
- Interactive map of Capdesaso
- Country: Spain
- Autonomous community: Aragon
- Province: Huesca

Area
  - Total: 17 km^{2} (6.6 sq mi)

Population (2025-01-01)
  - Total: 190
  - Density: 11/km^{2} (29/sq mi)
- Time zone: UTC+1 (CET)
  - Summer (DST): UTC+2 (CEST)

Capdesaso (Aragonese Cabosaso) is a municipality located in the province of Huesca, Aragon, Spain. According to the 2004 census (INE), the municipality has a population of 160 inhabitants.

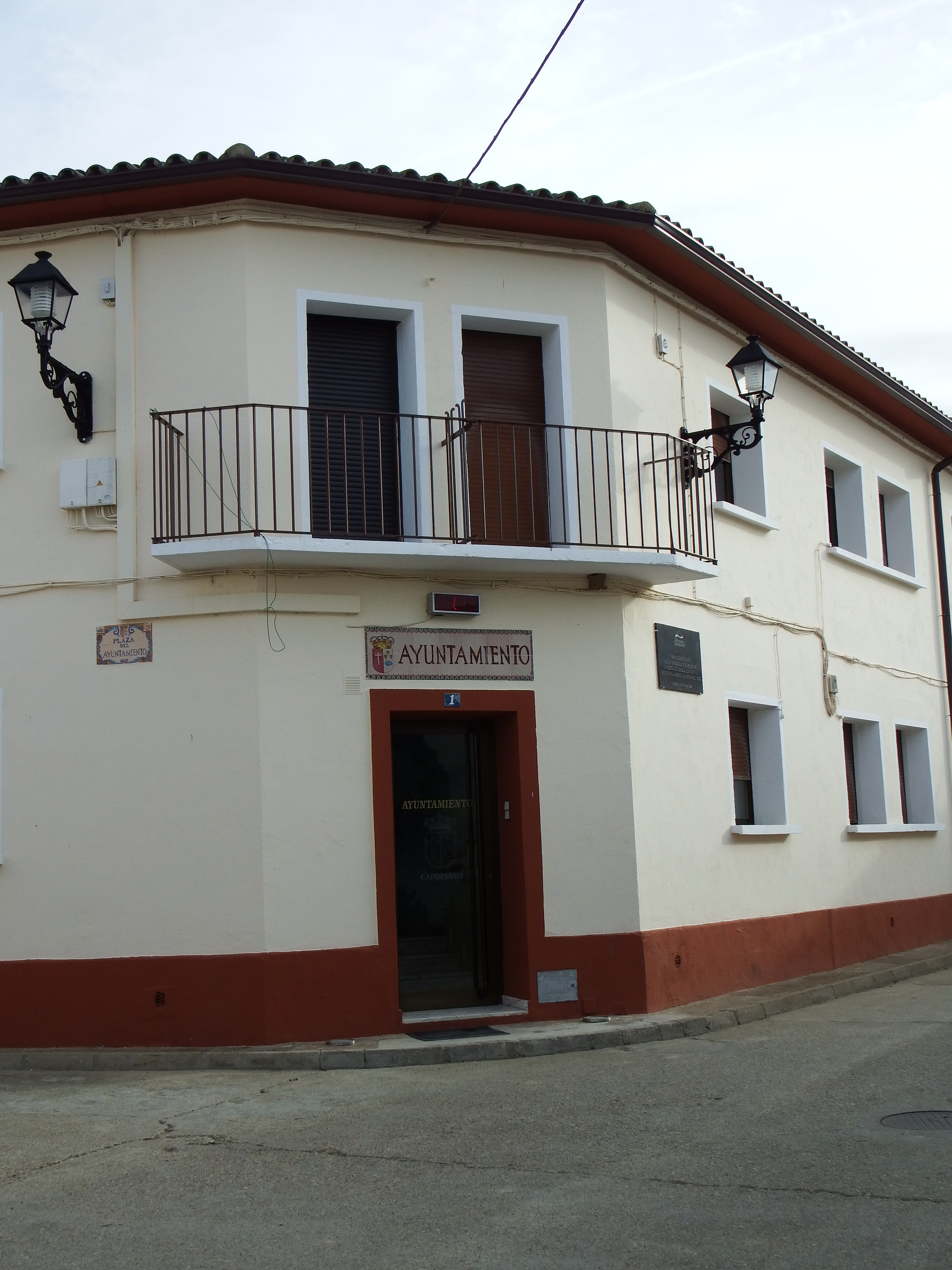
Capdesaso Town Hall

== See also ==
- List of municipalities in Huesca
