= Peñalba =

Coordinates: 41°30′0″N 0°2′0″W

Peñalba Penyalba
- municipality
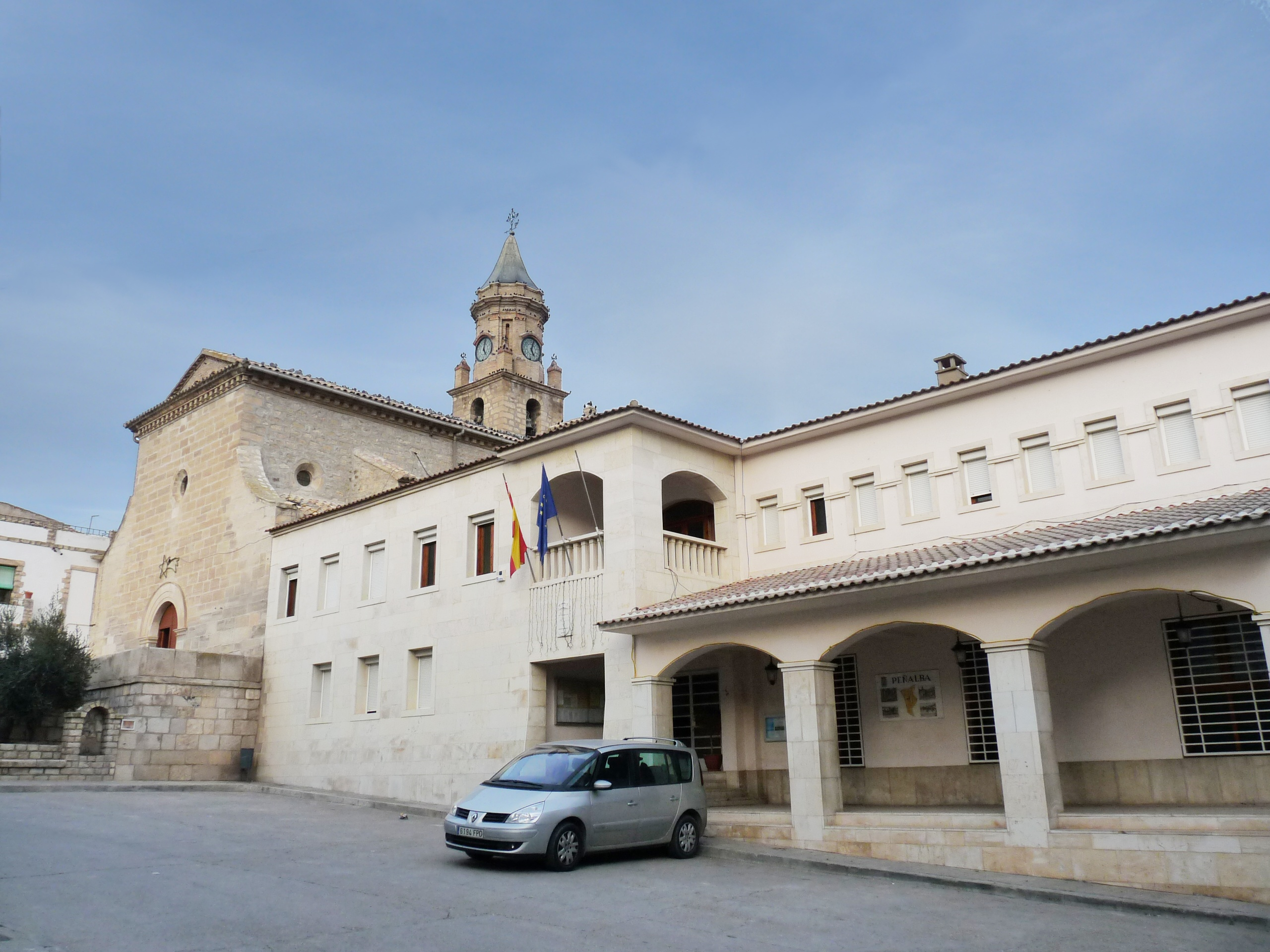

- Coat of arms
- Interactive map of Peñalba
- Country: Spain
- Autonomous community: Aragon
- Province: Huesca

Area
  - Total: 156 km^{2} (60 sq mi)

Population (2025-01-01)
  - Total: 657
  - Density: 4.21/km^{2} (10.9/sq mi)
- Time zone: UTC+1 (CET)
  - Summer (DST): UTC+2 (CEST)

Peñalba (Aragonese: Penyalba) is a municipality located in the province of Huesca, Aragon, Spain. According to the 2004 census (INE), the municipality has a population of 742 inhabitants.

== See also ==
- List of municipalities in Huesca
