= Senés de Alcubierre =

Coordinates: 41°54′N 0°29′W

Senés de Alcubierre, Spain
- Flag Coat of arms
- Interactive map of Senés de Alcubierre, Spain
- Country: Spain
- Autonomous community: Aragon
- Province: Huesca
- Municipality: Senés de Alcubierre

Area
  - Total: 20 km^{2} (7.7 sq mi)

Population (2025-01-01)
  - Total: 49
  - Density: 2.5/km^{2} (6.3/sq mi)
- Time zone: UTC+1 (CET)
  - Summer (DST): UTC+2 (CEST)

Senés de Alcubierre is a municipality located in the province of Huesca, Aragon, Spain. According to the 2004 census (INE), the municipality has a population of 50 inhabitants.

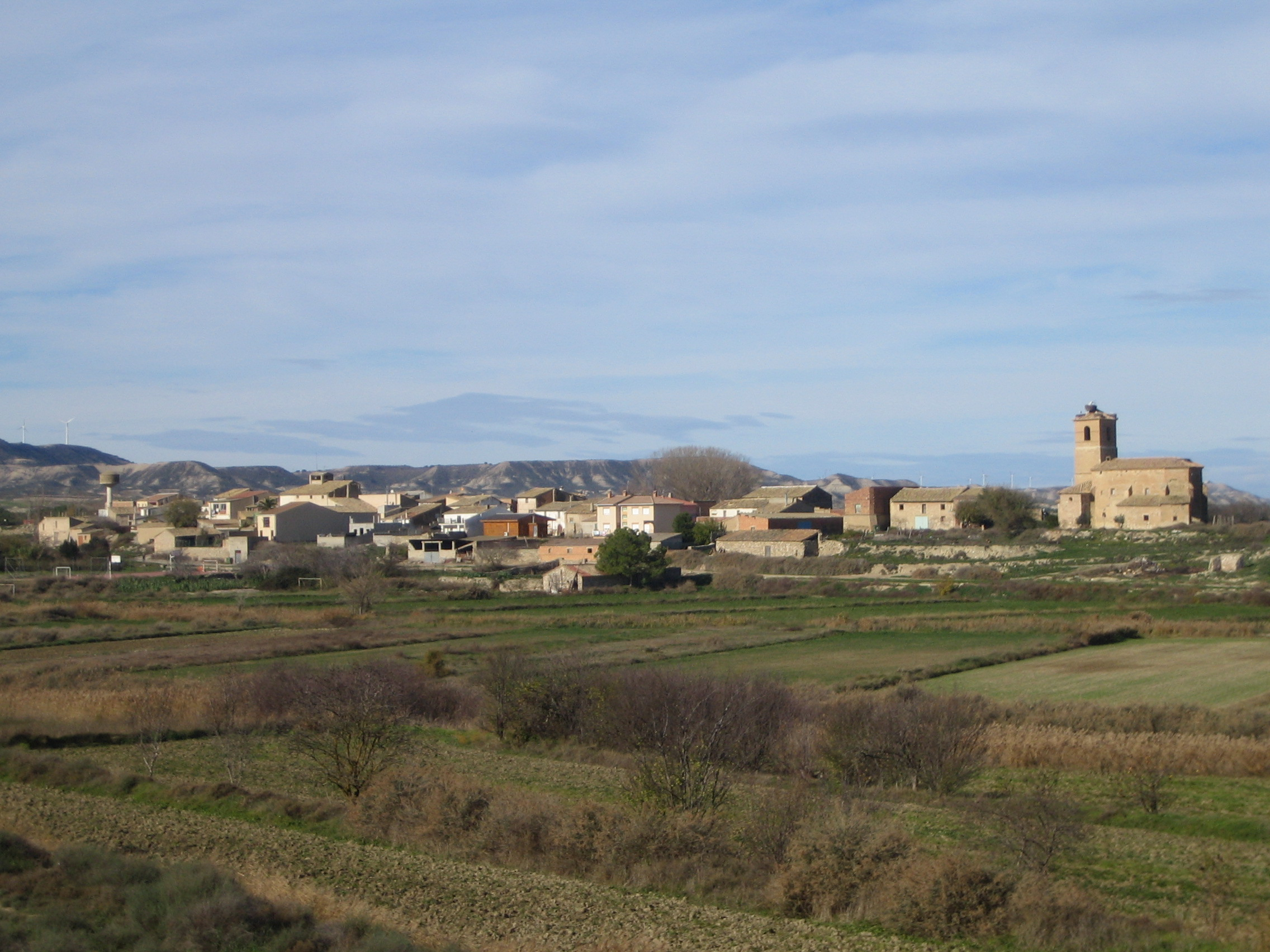
Senés de Alcubierre.
