= Sierra de Alcubierre =

Mountain range

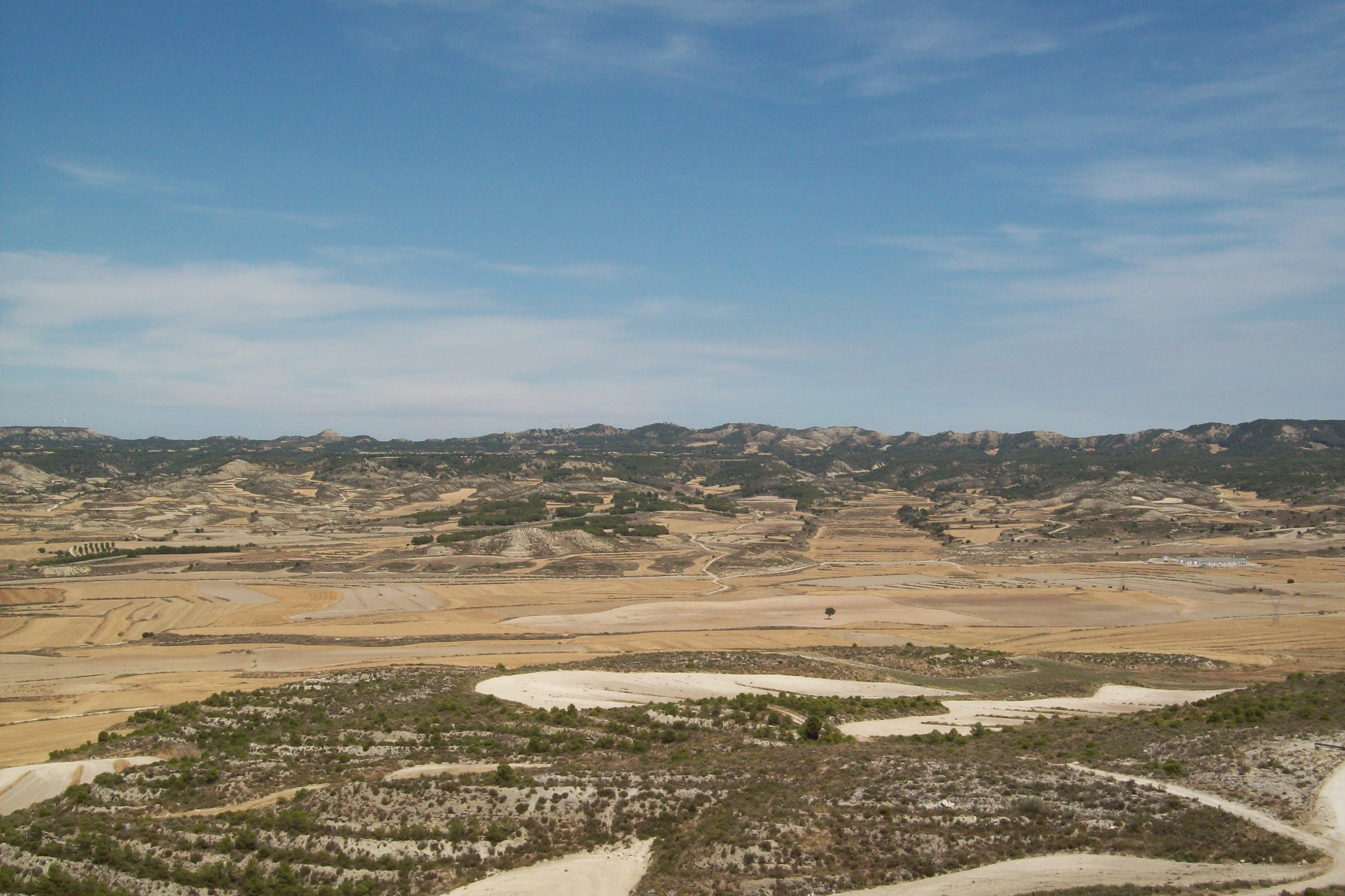
- Sierra de Alcubierre seen from Leciñena

Highest point
- Peak: Monte Oscuro
- Elevation: 822 m (2,697 ft)
- Listing: List of mountains in Aragon
- Coordinates: 41°44′N 0°29′W

Geography
- Location within Spain
- Location: Monegros (Aragon)

Geology
- Rock age: Cambrian
- Rock type: Sedimentary rock

Climbing
- Easiest route: Drive from Farlete

Sierra de Alcubierre is a 40 km (25 mi) long mountain range in the Monegros comarca, Aragon, Spain. It is located between the provinces of Zaragoza and Huesca.

== Geography ==
This mountain chain crosses the arid eastern end of the Monegros comarca from northwest to southeast and divides the basins of the Gállego and Isuela rivers. It has numerous ravines and its landscape is characteristic of badlands.

The ridge's highest summits are Monte Oscuro (822 m) and San Caprasio (811 m); other summits are Corona de la Reina (629 m) and Vedao (548 m), located at the northern end of the range, as well as Sigena (592 m) and Huegas (447 m), located at the southern end.

This mountain range is named after the town of Alcubierre, located 3 km east of the range. The Sierra de Alcubierre is divided into subranges, foremost of which are Sierra de Lanaja, named after Lanaja town, and Sierra de Pallaruelo, named after Pallaruelo de Monegros village, both located roughly in the central part of the main range.

== See also ==
- Monegros
- Mountains of Aragon
