= Lanaja =

Lanaja Lanacha
- municipality
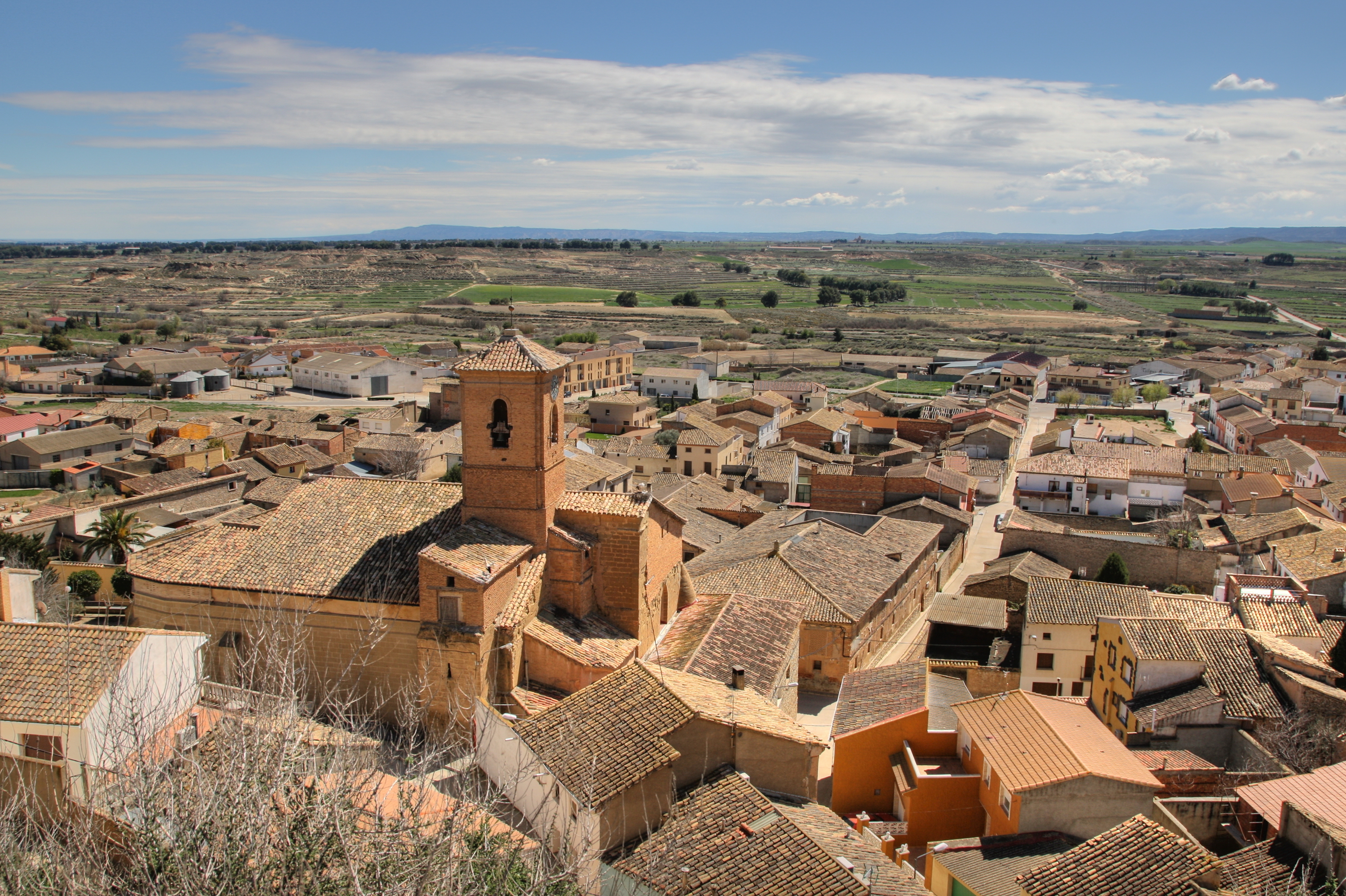

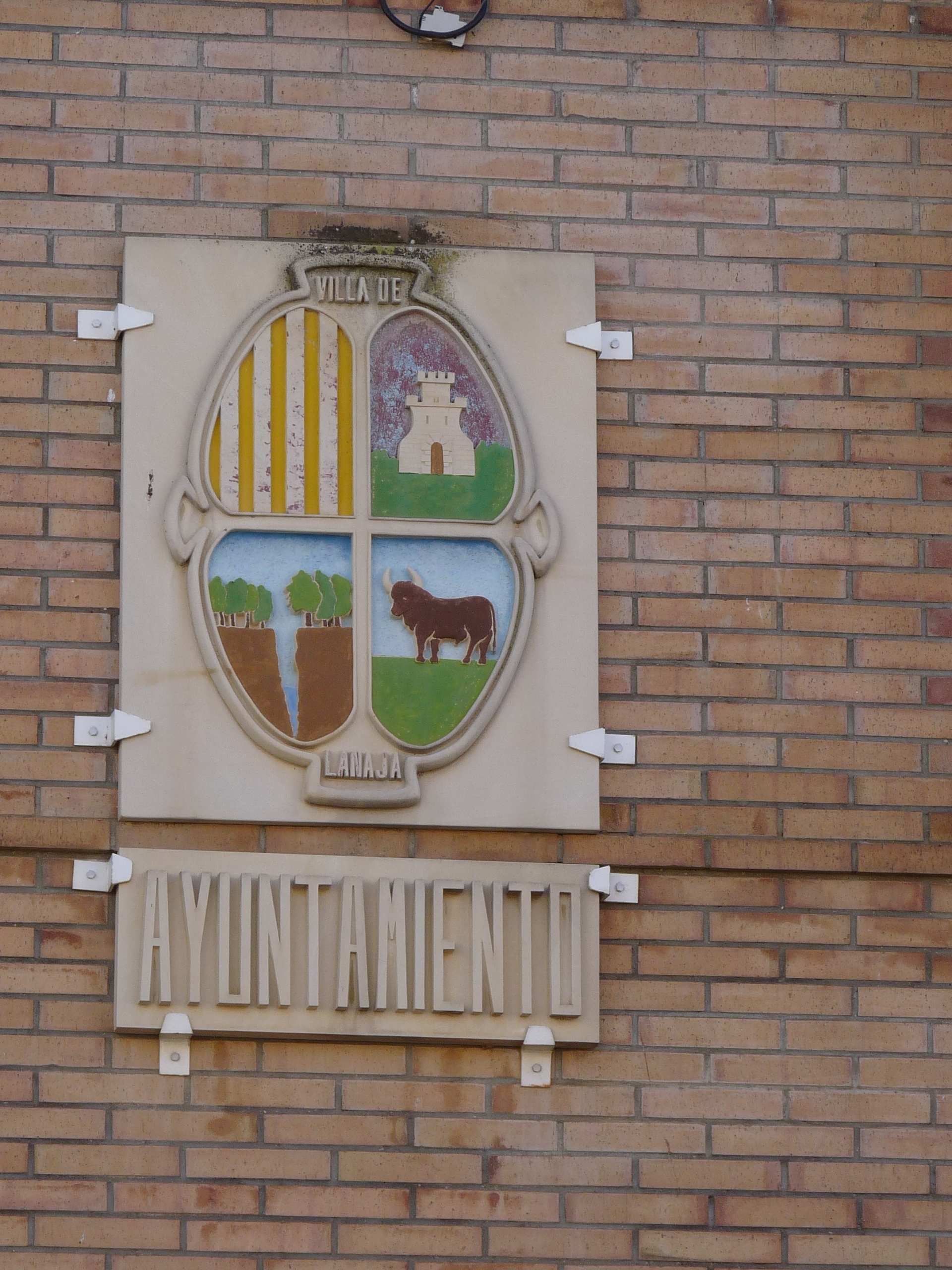
- Coat of arms
- Interactive map of Lanaja
- Coordinates: 41°46′15″N 0°19′44″E
- Country: Spain
- Autonomous community: Aragon
- Province: Huesca

Area
  - Total: 183.7 km^{2} (70.9 sq mi)

Population (2025-01-01)
  - Total: 1,140
  - Density: 6.21/km^{2} (16.1/sq mi)
- Time zone: UTC+1 (CET)
  - Summer (DST): UTC+2 (CEST)
- Website: [www.lanaja.com]

Lanaja (Aragonese Lanacha) is a municipality located in the province of Huesca, Aragon, Spain. According to the 2011 census (INE), the municipality has a population of 1,381 inhabitants. The village has approximately 1,100 inhabitants; the neighbouring villages of Cantalobos and Orillena comprise an additional 400.

== Cultural anthropology ==
The book “Lanaja, la vida en un pueblo de Monegros antes de los regadíos”, eng. „Lanaja, life in a Monegran village before irrigation“ by Ramón Lasaosa Susín, published by Imago, Huesca, 1997, contains detailed information about the culture as well as the way of life and work of the inhabitants of Lanaja up to the early years of the 20th century.

== History ==
In the 19th century Lanaja suffered raids from various groups of bandits which operated from their hide-outs in the nearby Sierra de Alcubierre. The town was the scene of the death of the celebrated bandit Mariano Gavín Suñén «Cucaracha», which occurred 28-2-1875, shot by the Guardia Civil having been poisoned along with four members of his band in the village of Peñalbeta.

In the early days of the military uprising of July 1936, Lanaja fought off an initial attack of the Zaragoza 'falangists'. The town was occupied at the end of July by the Arquer-Piquer column of the POUM, which upon entering found the corpses of five murdered republicans, assassinated by the fascists prior to their final retreat. (“Josep Rovira, una vida al servei de Catalunya i del socialisme”, de Josep Coll y Josep Pané, page 92, published Ariel. Barcelona, 1978).

To stabilise the front in the Sierra de Alcubierre and bring the population behind the government forces, Lanaja suffered heavy bombardment at the hand of the Franco airforce causing numerous deaths amongst the civil population. The collapse of the Aragón front provoked an exodus of part of the population to Catalonia. While the town was occupied by the rebel troops, a brutally repressive regime descended causing indeterminate but in any case numerous deaths and repression. This continued into the post war years, creating a climate of fear and silence around these events that lasted decades.

== Administration ==
=== Recent election results in Lanaja ===
| Period | Name | Party |
|---|---|---|
| 1979–1983 | | |
| 1983–1987 | | |
| 1987–1991 | | |
| 1991–1995 | | |
| 1995–1999 | | |
| 1999–2003 | | |
| 2003–2007 | | PSOE-Aragón |
| 2007–2011 | Cecilio Boned Yago | PSOE-Aragón |
| 2011–2015 | Armando Borraz Alcubierre | PSOE-Aragón |

=== Electoral results ===
Elecciones municipales
| Partido | 2003 | 2007 | 2011 |
| PSOE-Aragón | 5 | 6 | 6 |
| PP de Aragón | 1 | - | 2 |
| CHA | 2 | 2 | 1 |
| PAR | 1 | 1 | - |
| Total | 9 | 9 | 9 |

Fuentes: Gobierno de Aragón

== Politics ==
Since the restoration of democracy in Spain in 1977, Lanaja has repeatedly shown itself with a high voter turnout (close to 75% in most elections), and with a strong left-wing vote, mainly concentrated on the candidates of the PSOE party.

=== Electoral information ===
- https://web.archive.org/web/20070605213623/http://www.locales2007.mir.es/inicialv.htm
- https://web.archive.org/web/20080516052655/http://www.elpais.com/comunes/2007/elecciones/

== Twin town ==
- France Chasseneuil-du-Poitou, France

== See also ==
- List of municipalities in Huesca

== See also ==
http://www.lanaja.com
