= International Group of the Durruti Column =

Foreign volunteer unit of the Spanish Civil War

International Group
- Grupo Internacional
- Active: August 1936–July 1937
- Countries: Various
- Allegiance: Spanish Republic
- Branch: Confederal militias (1936); Spanish Republican Army (1937)
- Type: Infantry
- Role: Shock troops
- Size: 240–400
- Part of: Durruti Column (1936); 26th Division (1937)
- Engagements: Spanish Civil War: Aragon front; Siege of Madrid

Commanders
- Commander-in-chief: Louis Berthomieu (August–October 1936); Mohamed Saïl (October–November 1936)

The International Group (Spanish: Grupo Internacional) was a detachment of foreign volunteers that fought in the Spanish Civil War as part of the Durruti Column. First established by French anarchists who had gone to fight on the Aragon front in August 1936, it grew to include members from throughout Europe and North America, with groupings being formed out of French and German fighters. The group was almost whiped out in the Battle of Perdiguera in October 1936, during which its commander Louis Berthomieu was killed. It was then transferred to the Madrid front and later back to the Aragon front, where it underwent militarisation.

Its members consisted of a mix of people from various different left-wing factions, who disagreed on how the militarisation process ought to take place. Despite objections, it was ultimately reorganised into the International Company of the Spanish Republican Army's 26th Division and later renamed to the International Workers' Association Battalion. When the group refused to take part in an offensive against Quinto, it was disbanded and its members transferred to the International Brigades. Many of its members later took part in the resistance to Nazi Germany in World War II.

== Background ==
During the 1930s, anti-fascism had developed into an international and transnational movement. The outbreak of the Spanish Revolution of 1936, which saw the collectivisation of the economy and formation of revolutionary militias to fight against the Nationalists in the burgeoning civil war, galvanised the previously stagnant international anarchist movement. New groups formed to promote solidarity with the Spanish revolutionaries, while some went to Spain themselves to work for the National Confederation of Labour (CNT) or volunteer for the militias. Roughly 35,000 foreign supporters volunteered to fight for the Republicans, with most joining the communist International Brigades, while a significant minority enlisted in the anarchist confederal militias. Between 1,000 and 3,000 foreign anarchists went to Revolutionary Catalonia to volunteer as fighters. According to historian Robert J. Alexander, the role of these foreign anarchist volunteers in the war has been "disproportionately neglected" in popular historiography of the war.

== Establishment ==
On 23 July, the first Catalan militia column, the Durruti Column, led by the anarchist revolutionary Buenaventura Durruti, left Barcelona for the Aragon front. The Column had been organised along anarcho-syndicalist lines, without bureaucracy or a traditional military hierarchy, which artillery colonel Ricardo Jiménez de la Beraza described as a form of "chaos that works". As it captured territory in Aragon, the Column executed local political bosses, priests and other right-wing sympathisers, burned property registers, encouraged the collectivisation of land and even abolished money in some areas. According to Swiss communist volunteer Edi Gmür, the anarchists preferred to execute their enemies rather than take them captive, in accordance with their ideas on prison abolition. However, a shortage of arms and ammunition prevented the Column from marching against the Aragonese capital of Zaragoza, which led to the militias' offensive stalling.

Soon after the revolution began, foreign anarchists began volunteering for the militias; they crossed the border at Puigcerdá, then went on to Barcelona, before being transferred to the Aragon front. Many of them were attracted to the Durruti Column, as Durruti had gained international fame for his campaign of bank robberies in Latin America and his attempted assassination of Alfonso XIII in Paris. Charles Ridel and Charles Carpentier, both members of the Francophone Anarchist Union, joined up with the Durruti Column in Fraga. Another early volunteer was Émile Cottin, an anarchist militant who had attempted to assassinate French prime minister Georges Clemenceau. Within the column, these French fighters became known as the "black berets", in reference to their headwear. By August 1936, they had established the Durruti Column's International Group, which initially consisted of 29 French volunteers, including two women and two underage boys. Soon after its formation, the International Group fought in the Battle of Pina de Ebro.

Within two months, the International Group had grown to 50 people of various nationalities, with its French and Italian militiamen going on to form the Sébastien Faure centuria. International groups were also established in the Ascaso Column and Ortiz Column, although foreign anarchists played a less prominent role in these other units. The International Group functioned as an autonomous detachment of the Column. The International Group was valourised by the French anarchist newspapers Le Combat syndicaliste and Le Libertaire, and praised for its bravery by the Durruti Column's own newspaper El Frente.

== Recruitment ==
Most of the International Group's volunteers came to Spain during the early months of the war, at a time when the anarchist militias had the most prestige of the Republican units and when the Durruti Column specifically was known for being a "tough outfit". The International Group's recruitment efforts were informal and decentralised, in contrast with the institutionalised recruitment procedures of the International Brigades. Some foreign volunteers, such as the Italian-American Carl Marzani, served in the Durruti Column but did not join its International Group. Volunteers were processed by a revolutionary committee in Northern Catalonia. The CNT was less active in recruiting foreign volunteers than the Communist International, instead pressing for foreign sympathisers to campaign against non-intervention and for arming the Republicans. But they received so many volunteers that, by September 1936, the Central Committee of Anti-Fascist Militias of Catalonia (CCMA) was publicly requesting that anarchists stop volunteering as combatants and non-combatants, and began turning people away. Durruti himself complained in a letter to Le Libertaire about "tourists" who had expected special treatment from the Spanish and resisted discipline after volunteering for the militias; he urged sympathisers to instead do propaganda work in their own countries, which he believed they would be more useful to them. Following the battle of Madrid in November 1936, most foreign volunteers who arrived in Spain joined the International Brigades instead of the anarchist militias. The French government also began cracking down on the passage of foreign volunteers through Northern Catalonia, with anarchists reporting that the department effectively turned into a police state.

== Composition ==
Between 240 and 400 foreign volunteers served in the International Group of the Durruti Column. From primary sources and the records of the International Institute of Social History and the Russian State Archive of Socio-Political History, historian Morris Brodie identified 368 individual fighters from 25 different countries who had served at one time or another. Most of the volunteers were workers and only few had military experience; sailors were one of the most common professions in the International Group, followed by other skilled and unskilled workers. Only 7 volunteers had a prior military career. Most of the volunteers did not speak Spanish on arrival, but quickly became acquainted with Spanish revolutionary slogans.

=== Command ===
The unit followed an ad hoc system of "revolutionary discipline", in which their commander's orders were either confirmed or rejected by a vote. The group's commanders were elected based on their military experience, rather than because of any previous posts or their ideological tendency, and were mostly veterans of World War I. The International Group's first elected delegate and de facto commander was the French artillery captain Louis Berthomieu, a military officer who said he "knew nothing" about politics. After Berthomieu was killed in action, he was succeeded as delegate of the International Group by the anarchist activist Mohamed Saïl. Others with a military background, including the French Alexis Cardeur, Italian Pietro Vagliasindi and Germans Christian Lamotte and Carl Einstein also served in leadership positions in the group. Willi Schroth, who had been a member of the French Foreign Legion and later joined the XIII International Brigade, was denigrated as a "politically unreliable" and "undisciplined" mercenary by communist officials.

=== National groupings ===
The International Group was officially composed of five groups of fifty people, but in practice it was split into two main groupings. The first was the French-speaking centuria, named after Sébastien Faure. Established by Le Libertaire in September 1936, it primarily brought together French-speaking anarchists and Italian anarchists, as well as a number of people from other countries. It came to include 120 volunteers from France, 3 from Belgium and 17 from Italy. (Note: There were relatively few Italian volunteers in the Durruti Column, compared with other units, as most Italian anarchists joined the Ascaso Column.) The first elected delegate of the Sébastien Faure centuria was Georges Monnard, who was succeeded later by Jean Martin. In October 1936, Sébastien Faure himself visited the Durruti Column in Bujaraloz. Many of its members were affiliated with the General Confederation of Labour (CGT) or the Revolutionary Syndicalist General Confederation of Labour (CGT-SR).

In late October 1936, 18 German volunteers led by the Trotskyist Kurt Lehmann quit the Karl Marx Column in protest after Hans Beimler had ordered the replacement of their elected political commissar with a Stalinist appointee, and joined up with the Durruti Column. They formed a German-speaking centuria, possibly named after Erich Mühsam, which came to consist of at least 85 fighters from Germany, (Note: Out of a total of 200 German anarchist volunteers in the confederal militias, the largest number joined the International Group of the Durruti Column.) 14 from Switzerland (Note: 4 of the Swiss volunteers were athletes who had come to Barcelona to compete in the People's Olympiad.) and 5 each from Austria and Sweden (Note: Some of its Swedish members were affiliated with the Central Organisation of Swedish Workers (SAC).). The German volunteers largely consisted of refugees who had fled Nazi Germany, some having escaped concentration camps, and found asylum in the Spanish Republic or the other democratic states of Europe. Some of them were anarcho-syndicalists of the Free Workers' Union of Germany (FAUD) and others were former members of the Communist Party of Germany (KPD); the latter accounted for 40% of the German volunteers. 11 of the German volunteers were sailors affiliated with the International Transport Workers' Federation or International Union of Seamen and Harbour Workers. Four of the volunteers affiliated themselves with the Spanish Socialist Workers' Party (PSOE), one of whom had been a member of the Socialist Workers' Party of Germany (SAPD), and several others affiliated with the Workers' Party of Marxist Unification (POUM). Another two German volunteers defected from the International Brigades after being broken out of a Communist prison by an anarchist commando.

The unit had three smaller sections made up of other nationalities, in which "half a dozen" different languages were spoken. These included 5 each from Bulgaria and the Netherlands, 4 from the United States, 2 each from Canada, England and the Soviet Union, (Note: Both volunteers were veterans of the Russian Civil War, one had fought in the Russian White Army and the other was a Ukrainian Makhnovist.) and 1 each from Cuba, Czechoslovakia, Estonia, Lithuania and Portugal. There were also an unidentified number from Hungary, Luxembourg, Norway, Poland, Romania and Yugoslavia. According to Abel Paz, there were also some Moroccans in the group. 47 Spanish fighters were also added to the International Group, either to fill out some of its smaller units or because they had been in exile from Spain and joined up with comrades they had met abroad. There was an additional centuria named after Sacco and Vanzetti; although some sources claim it was an American unit, historian Kenyon Zimmer disputes that it had a chiefly American composition, as there were only a few Americans in the Column. Some were affiliated with the North American Industrial Workers of the World (IWW).

=== Gender ===
Despite an official prohibition on women serving in the military, some 1,000 women joined the militias during the early months of the war. 12 members of the International Group were women, of whom 4 had joined along with their partners and 3 were nurses. With the notable exception of Simone Weil, who was a middle-class intellectual, many of the names of the Column's working-class militiawomen have not been preserved in historical accounts. Although historian Lisa Lines depicted the participation of these militiawomen as a manifestation of the revolution's advancement of gender equality, militia commanders discouraged women from joining the Column and ordered those who joined (including Weil) to remain in the field kitchen. Militiawomen also faced sexual harassment from their male comrades. Most of the militiawomen who served in the International Group were killed in action, and in March 1937, those who still survived were expelled from the militias and removed from the front.

== Combat ==
=== Early engagements ===
Due to the lack of weapons and ammunition required for waging conventional warfare on the Aragon front, the International Group was mainly used as shock troops and to infiltrate behind enemy lines in guerrilla operations. On one occasion, the group crossed the Ebro river and captured Nationalist troops in their own trenches near the town of Aguilar de Ebro. According to Simone Weil, the decision to carry out the expedition had been confirmed by acclamation by an assembly of the International Group. In September 1936, the International Group fought in the battle of Siétamo.

=== Battle of Perdiguera ===
In early October 1936, the Nationalists began advancing against the Durruti Column's positions. On 10 October, Nationalist reinforcements arrived at Perdiguera and took the high ground between it and Lecinyena, while others captured the heights of the Sierra d'Alcubierre. After days of heavy fighting, the Nationalists captured Lecinyena and killed many of its Republican defenders. With the Republican supply lines disrupted by the capture of Licenyena, on 12 October, the Nationalists attacked POUM-held positions north of the Sierra d'Alcubierre. The Durruti Column provided reinforcements and contained the Nationalists at Alcubierre, before mustering their forces for a counterattack against Licenyena. On 14 October, the Durruti Column advanced down the road from Villamayor towards the enemy lines at Perdiguera and Lecinyena. 40 fighters of the International Group, led by Louis Berthomieu, broke off from the rest of the Column and went towards Perdiguera. There they attacked the Nationalists defenses with hand grenades, entered the town and finally defeated the local garrison on 16 October.

The Nationalists were quickly reinforced by two battalions from Zaragoza, which besieged Perdiguera. The International Group were cornered in a number of the town's houses, outnumbered 20-to-1, with their exits blocked by cavalry. Ridel and Carpentier managed to slip through the enemy lines and reunite with the rest of the Durruti Column. The other 38 (including their commander Louis Berthomieu) stayed behind in the town and fought to their deaths. The Durruti Column attempted to counterattack and aid the besieged International Group, but a surprise attack by another detachment of Nationalists prevented them from doing so. When the Nationalists retook Perdiguera, they executed three of the International Group's nurses, some of whom were affiliated with the Red Cross.

By the end of the battle, the Durruti Column had reestablished a continuous front as far north as Mont Escuro, the highest peak of the Sierra d'Alcubierre, where they pushed out the Nationalists and reestablished contact with the POUM militia. Belgian militiaman Mathieu Corman reported that "the territory gained didn't compensate for the Column's losses. Berthomieu alone was worth more than all that." He concluded his report by saying "If war is the great devourer of men, here she took men of quality. The most valiant and generous were the first to fall."

=== Later interventions ===
The International Group had almost been whiped out during the battle of Perdiguera, but continued functioning. In November 1936, the international volunteers were transferred to the Madrid front. There they fought in the battle of Ciudad Universitaria, where the column's commander Buenaventura Durruti was killed. According to Mathieu Corman, Durruti had been assassinated by a member of the Nationalists' fifth column, who fired at him from a house in Madrid, before themselves being killed by the Column's militiamen. They were subsequently transferred back to the Aragon front, where they fought in the battle of Quinto in December 1936.

== Militarisation ==
The ad hoc militia system established at the beginning of the war was viewed with scepticism by Republican military officers and their Soviet backers, who each sought to bring the fighting units under the control of the government and integrate them into a disciplined and hierarchical military structure. In October 1936, prime minister Francisco Largo Caballero decreed that the militias be militarised and incorporated into the Spanish Republican Army. The International Group had promoted political pluralism, with its members representing a mix of anarchists, socialists, Stalinists, Trotsykists and even apolitical and pacifist volunteers. While the anarchists and Trotskyists sought to wage a revolutionary war against the Nationalists, the Stalinists were opposed to the Spanish Revolution and advocated for the reconstruction of the Republican state so it could wage a conventional war against fascism. Political debate was permitted, resulting in regular arguments between the anarchists and communists. The group's anarchist political commissar, Rudolf Michaelis, provoked such frequent political disagreements that, in February 1937, several Marxist volunteers defected to other units.

The issue of militarisation provoked a particularly fierce debate within the International Group. Some, including German commander Carl Einstein, were convinced by the merits of its non-military structure. Although not an anarchist when he joined, Einstein's experiences in the Column had influenced his conversion to anarchism. But according to Simone Weil, the command structure of elected delegates had resulted in the group's commanders lacking in both competence and authority, while its fighters lacked discipline and often shirked their duties. Swiss militiaman Edi Gmür was frustrated by the arguments over militarisation, which he viewed as a matter of urgent necessity, and the German Arthur Galanty criticised the group's officers for incompetence and pointed to a lack of military training among the militiamen. They nevertheless had reservations about militarisation, with a group of German anarcho-syndicalists criticising the lack of dialogue between military officers and volunteer militiamen, and calling for the preservation of freedom of the press and freedom of speech within the new military structures.

The International Group had been promised the right to elect their own commander following the militarisation process, but in January 1937, José Manzana revoked the Column's recognition of their elected delegates. When the group published a manifesto calling for the restoration of its autonomy, Manzana rebuffed its requests and banned further group meetings, ordering them to submit to militarisation or face military discharge. Many Spanish anarchists were also unsympathetic to the International Group's requests for autonomy from native Spanish organisational structures. The Durruti Column was subsequently reorganised into the 26th Division, to which the International Group remained attached, now under the name of the International Company. It was later reorganised into the International Workers' Association Battalion. The Sébastien Faure centuria was also integrated into the 3rd Battalion of the 121st Mixed Brigade, although its members continued referring to it by its former name.

The process of militarisation led not only to the centralisation of command structures, but also to the nationalisation of military units by diminishing the influence of foreign fighters. In the wake of militarisation, 49 foreign volunteers deserted the front. The International Group's founders, Carpentier and Ridel, returned to France and did a speaking tour of the country to raise awareness of the situation in Spain. Despite the promises of militarisation, the anarchist units continued to face supply and equipment shortages and they were often denied pay. Canadian volunteer Bill Wood reported that some men in the International Group died from starvation and resorted to begging for money. When they were paid, members of the International Group spent a substantial amount of their wages on contraband alcohol, prompting the 26th Division's commanders to crack down on the smuggling of alcohol to its men. José Manzana later attributed the militarisation to a drop in morale among the enlisted soldiers.

== Disbandment ==
Sectarian tensions between the anti-statist and statist wings of the Republican faction culminated with the outbreak of the May Days of 1937, during which anarchists rose up against the Republican government in Catalonia. The International Group found itself in the centre of the fighting in Barcelona, where it had been placed on leave. The uprising was ultimately suppressed after a week of fighting, during which hundreds had been killed and wounded. The Republican government subsequently launched a crackdown against foreign anarchists. In June 1937, the government banned foreign volunteers from serving in any unit other than the International Brigades. Over the following months, Spanish police arrested 31 volunteers of the International Group. In July 1937, German volunteer Helmut Kirschey was arrested on charges of being a "counter-revolutionary" who had communists, and Swiss volunteer Jacop Aeppli was disappeared.

In July 1937, after the International Group had refused to take part in an offensive against Quinto due to a lack of equipment and fire support, the unit was disbanded by the Republican military command. This brought an end to the period of the war in which foreign anarchists had constituted a distinct fighting force. Many of the group's members were subsequently transferred to the International Brigades, within which group members Emanuel Fischer and Norbert Rauschenberger were respectively promoted to the ranks of sergeant and lieutenant. In contrast, Rudolf Michaelis applied for Spanish nationality in order to remain in the 26th Division. Foreign anarchists who continued to volunteer were likewise integrated into the Brigades. Due to their perception as politically unreliable by the Brigades' communist commanders, foreign anarchists became the target of repression and were often punished for insubordination, desertion or treason. Sustained harassment by communist officials forced many foreign anarchists to leave the country.

== Aftermath ==
Upon returning to their home countries, many International Group volunteers were treated with suspicion by their respective states, which worried that they would bring their military experience and political radicalisation in the Spanish Civil War back with them. After the war ended, at least 20 members of the International Group were detained in French internment camps; these included 7 German members, who were held in Gurs. Alfred Berger was captured by the Nationalists and held as a prisoner of war in the concentration camp of San Pedro de Cardeña. After the fall of France in 1940, Carl Einstein committed suicide in Lestelle-Bétharram. German volunteers Helmuth Bruhns, Kurt and Werner Lehmann were all handed over by the Vichy authorities to the Nazis; Werner died in Nazi custody, and Bruhns and Kurt Lehmann were imprisoned in Nazi Germany until the end of World War II. Others from the International Group joined various wartime anti-fascist movements. Mathieu Corman and Aimé Turrel went on to fight in the French Resistance, while Fritz Benner, Karl Loshaus and Hans Vesper worked for the Norwegian Resistance. Olov Jansson worked together with Willy Brandt on the Swedish-Norwegian Press Bureau, before moving to the United Kingdom and working for the BBC. During the war, Mohamed Saïl made counterfeit documents for Algerian workers in France, and after the war, agitated for Algerian independence.

== List of members ==
French

- Juliette Baudard
- Louis Berthomieu
- Clovis Billet
- Bourdom (Note: Given name unknown.)
- Alexis Cardeur
- François Charles Carpentier
- Eugenie Casteu
- Lucien Chatelain
- Émile Cottin
- Émile Defeche
- Fernand Fortin
- Giral
- Suzanne Girbe
- Suzanne Hans
- Georgette Kokoczynski
- Lacrosille
- Robert Léger
- Lévysse
- Jean Martin
- Jean Mayol
- Fernand Métant
- Meuret
- Jacques Milani
- Georges Monnard
- Émilienne Morin
- André Mougeot
- René Neveu
- S.O. (Note: Full name unknown.)
- Pierre Ódeon
- R.
- Louis Recoulis
- Mohamed Saïl
- Jean Sellenet
- Trontin
- Antoine Turmo
- Aimé Turrel
- Simone Weil

Belgian

- Mathieu Corman
- Charles Ridel

German

- Alfred Berger
- Heinrich Eichmann
- Carl Einstein
- Emanuel Fischer
- Arthur Galanty
- Georg Gernsheimer
- Gertrudis (Note: Surname unknown.)
- Christian Lamotte
- Augusta Marx
- Rudolf Michaelis
- Norbert Rauschenberger
- Willi Schroth
- Franz Wiese

Austrian

- Leopoldine Kokes

Swiss

- Edi Gmür
- Clara Thalmann

Swedish

- Nils Lätt

Italian

- Antoine Gimenez
- Ragazini
- Pietro Vagliasindi

Portuguese

- Julio Mescareuhas

American

- John Givney
- Graña
- Giuseppe Paliaga
- Ed Scheddin

English

- Joseph Guerin
- Edward Ralph Harley

Canadian

- Louis Rosenberg
- Bill Wood

== Bibliography ==
- Alexander, Robert J. (1999). The Anarchists in the Spanish Civil War. London: Janus Publishing Company. ISBN 978-1-85756-400-6.
- Berry, David (1989). "French Anarchists in Spain, 1936–1939". French History. 3 (4): 427–441. doi:10.1093/fh/3.4.427. ISSN 0269-1191.
- Brodie, Morris (2020). Transatlantic Anarchism during the Spanish Civil War and Revolution, 1936-1939: Fury Over Spain. Routledge. doi:10.4324/9780429328763. ISBN 978-0-367-34930-1.
- Brodie, Morris (2021). "Volunteers for Anarchy: The International Group of the Durruti Column in the Spanish Civil War" (PDF). Journal of Contemporary History. 56 (1): 28–54. doi:10.1177/0022009420949926. ISSN 0022-0094.
- Durgan, Andy (2018). "With the POUM International volunteers on the Aragon Front (1936-1937)" (PDF). Ebre. 38 (8): 131–161. ISSN 1696-2672.
- Lines, Lisa (2009). "Female Combatants in the Spanish Civil War: Milicianas on the Front Lines and in the Rearguard". Journal of International Women's Studies. 10 (4). ISSN 1539-8706.
- McLellan, Josie (2004). Antifascism and Memory in East Germany: Remembering the International Brigades 1945-1989. OUP Oxford. ISBN 9780191515330.
- Paz, Abel (2006) [1996]. Durruti in the Spanish Revolution. Translated by Morse, Chuck. Edinburgh: AK Press. ISBN 1-904859-50-X. LCCN 2006920974. OCLC 482919277.
- Zimmer, Kenyon (2016). "The Other Volunteers: American Anarchists and the Spanish Civil War, 1936–1939". Journal for the Study of Radicalism. 10 (2): 19–52. doi:10.14321/jstudradi.10.2.0019.
