= North African Libertarian Movement =

Algerian anarchist organisation

North African Libertarian Movement Mouvement Libertaire Nord-Africain
- Abbreviation: MLNA
- Secretary: Fernand Doukhan (1950–1954); Léandre Valéro (1954–1957)
- Founded: 1950; 75 years ago
- Dissolved: 1957; 68 years ago
- Headquarters: Algiers
- Ideology: Anarchism; Platformism; Algerian independence
- Political position: Far-left
- International affiliation: Anarchist Federation (1950–1954); Libertarian Communist International (1954–1957)

The North African Libertarian Movement (French: Mouvement Libertaire Nord-Africain; MLNA) was an Algerian anarchist political organisation. Established in 1950 by members of the French Anarchist Federation, in 1954, the organisation affiliated itself with the Libertarian Communist International. The MLNA participated in the Algerian Revolution against French colonialism, collaborating with the National Liberation Front and Algerian National Movement. By 1957, it was suppressed by the French colonial authorities, with its members being killed or interned in concentration camps.

== Establishment ==
In the summer of 1950, six local anarchist groups in Algeria and Morocco, each affiliated with the French Anarchist Federation (FA), came together at a meeting in Algiers and established the North African Libertarian Movement (MLNA). It was initially led by the Algerian teacher Fernand Doukhan, a founding member of the Organisation Thought Battle. In September 1954, Léandre Valéro took over as the organisation's secretary. Its membership was largely made up of European and Jewish anarchists, as well as some native Algerians. One of the known native Algerian militants in the organisation was Derbal Salah, who came from Constantine. In October 1954, the MLNA affiliated with the Libertarian Communist International (ICL).

== Revolution ==
Following the outbreak of the Algerian Revolution on 1 November 1954, the MLNA quickly joined the movement for Algerian independence. On 11 November, the organisation published a declaration of support for the revolution in Le Libertaire, the newspaper of the French Libertarian Communist Federation (FCL). The organisation extended "critical support" to Algerian nationalism, while emphasising the differences between its aims from their own revolutionary objectives. It clandestinely distributed copies of Le Libertaire throughout Algeria, collected materiel for the National Liberation Front (FLN), and served as a point of contact between anarchists and the Algerian National Movement (MNA). The MLNA also supplied news about the war in Algeria to the FCL, which also gave "critical support" to Algerian national liberation.

== Suppression ==
Throughout the early years of the war in Algeria, the MLNA faced severe political repression by the French colonial authorities. According to Valéro, organisation members were threatened, murdered and interned in concentration camps. In early 1957, MLNA founder Fernand Doukhan was detained and tortured in the Lodi concentration camp, before being forcibly deported from Algeria. By this time, the MLNA had been completely suppressed.

== See also ==
- Mohamed Saïl – Algerian anarchist (1894–1953)

== Bibliography ==
- Ferretti, Federico (2025). "Worlding decolonisation: Rediscovering federalist and pluralist geographies of more-than-national liberation". Political Geography. 119. doi:10.1016/j.polgeo.2025.103322. hdl:11585/1014124. ISSN 0962-6298.
- Laursen, Ole Birk (2019). "Anti-imperialism". The Palgrave Handbook of Anarchism. Palgrave Macmillan. pp. 149–167. doi:10.1007/978-3-319-75620-2_8. ISBN 978-3-319-75619-6.
- Porter, David (2011). Eyes to the South: French Anarchists & Algeria. AK Press. ISBN 978-1-84935-076-1.
