= Fernand Doukhan =

French-Algerian anticolonial activist (1913–1996)

Fernand Isaäc Doukhan
- Born: 29 March 1913; Algiers, French Algeria
- Died: 14 May 1996 (aged 83); Montpellier, France
- Education: École normale supérieure de Bouzaréah
- Occupations: Schoolteacher; activist
- Movement: Anticolonialism; libertarian socialism; anarcho-syndicalism; libertarian communism; independence movement; antimilitarism; Trotskyism
- Criminal charges: For participation in the "eight-day strike"; offences against public security and order
- Spouse: Marguerite Hoarau
- Parent(s): Saül Doukhan (father); Clarisse Chemoul (mother)

Fernand Isaäc Doukhan (29 March 1913, Algiers – 14 May 1996, Montpellier) was a French schoolteacher and anticolonial activist of Berber Jewish origin. Born into a modest family in the Bab El Oued district, he became involved in trade unionism and libertarian communism, then in Trotskyism.

A militant for Algerian independence, he participated in the Solidarité internationale antifasciste (SIA) and supported the Front de libération nationale (FLN) as well as the Union générale des travailleurs algériens (UGTA). In 1954, by mandate of Georges Fontenis, leader of the Fédération communiste libertaire (FCL), he was tasked, together with Léandre Valéro, to establish links with the Mouvement national algérien (MNA) of Messali Hadj. Within the Mouvement libertaire nord-africain (MLNA), Doukhan contributed to coordinating between the FCL and the MNA and took part in clandestine activities: printing leaflets, housing militants and organising secret meetings.

A veteran of the 9th Regiment of Zouaves during the Second World War, he was taken prisoner in 1940 and detained in German stalags until 1945. Arrested in January 1957 during the UGTA/FLN eight-day strike, he was interned at the Lodi camp (Draa Essamar), where he met Henri Alleg, and later expelled to France in 1959.

== Biography ==
=== Childhood and family origins ===
Fernand Doukhan was born on 29 March 1913 in Algiers, French Algeria, into a modest Jewish family of Sephardic and Berber background. The only child of Saül Doukhan (1869–1944), a painter, and Clarisse Chemoul (born c. 1886), a teacher at the Talmud Torah school, he grew up in circumstances marked by precarity and the progressive assimilation of Algerian Jews made possible by the Crémieux Decree of 1870. The decree, promulgated by Adolphe Crémieux, granted French citizenship to indigenous Jews, altering the status of the Doukhan family: Saül, born indigenous in Boufarik shortly before this measure, thereby integrated into the French Republic, breaking with the dhimmi status inherited from the Regency of Algiers (6th–19th centuries).

The Doukhan family name comes from the Arabic dukhân ("smoke") and illustrates the challenges of Jewish integration in colonial Algeria. From Boufarik in the Mitidja plain, Saül's parents Isaac and Ester lived in extreme poverty; Isaac worked as an agricultural day labourer supporting a large sibling group hit by epidemics. Lacking formal schooling, the children learned only ritual Hebrew in a community steeped in Arab-Berber customs. Orphaned at twelve after the deaths of his parents and elder brother Jacob, Saül moved to the Casbah of Algiers and took charge of the family.

Saül and Clarisse married on 12 November 1907, uniting two poor lineages of the Casbah. Clarisse claimed rabbinic ancestry, possibly linked to Shimon ben Tsemah Duran (14th century). Their eldest daughter Estelle (born c.1908–1909) preceded Fernand. The family later moved to Bab El Oued, a European quarter, demonstrating aspirations toward assimilation despite modest housing.

Fernand's childhood was influenced by the virulent antisemitism of the 1890s and the Dreyfus Affair. Riots in Algiers led by Max Régis and Édouard Drumont (elected deputy in 1898) produced looting and violence against Jews, particularly in Bab El Oued. These events, which subsided around 1902, informed parental narratives and reinforced the determination to educate Fernand as a "good Frenchman".

First in his lineage to be born a full French citizen, Fernand broke with family traditions: he had a non-Hebrew given name (Fernand, with Isaac as his second name) and received secular schooling at the public school on Place Lelièvre, where he attended alongside Catholic and Protestant pupils and sometimes on Saturdays. Visits to his great-aunt Messaouda (1867–1943), a centenarian figure from the Casbah, transmitted Judeo-Berber roots. Saül is buried in the Jewish cemetery of Saint-Eugène (now Bologhine); his grave remains preserved. Fernand thus embodied the legacy of the Crémieux Decree, becoming a civil servant and republican soldier.

=== Training at the École normale de Bouzaréah (1930–1933) ===
Archival research in May 2010 in Algiers traced Fernand Doukhan's training at the École normale de Bouzaréah, an institution created by the sénatus-consulte of 14 July 1865 to train teachers for French Algeria. Although earlier documents had been lost in local archives, access was obtained to student registry booklets (1923–1934) via the institute's steward. These cardboard record books, separated between European and indigenous students, confirm his entry on 1 October 1930 and exit on 30 September 1933. Teachers' assessments describe him as "rather reserved, taciturn", diligent in his third year, with "ordinary means" in science and mathematics but showing pedagogical potential in the school annex.

Admitted at age 17 after a competitive exam (30 admitted out of 400 candidates, mostly from administrative or agricultural families), Doukhan was trained for higher primary teaching at the Rampe Valée following the elementary certificate. The training was free and included uniform and supplies, contrasting with family sacrifices: his elder sister Estelle was withdrawn from school to finance his studies by working as a typist. The regime at Bouzaréah—nicknamed "Maboul Ville" referencing its former use as an asylum—was strict: reveille at 5 a.m., military discipline, secular republican instruction, and limited leave. Students (including Doukhan, described as austere but a good dancer) experienced initial hazing and improvised dances. The institution occupied some 20 hectares with sports and garden facilities and prepared teachers for a civilising mission toward European and Muslim children.

This period coincided with the Centenary of French Algeria (1830–1930), celebrated with parades glorifying colonisation as a "civilising mission". Nevertheless, Doukhan observed persistent inequalities: until 1928 Muslim pupils had been segregated (different form of address, inferior refectory, lower pay after qualification) and were mostly limited to indigenous teaching posts, reflecting the colonial "indigénat" code (progressively repealed beginning in 1946). Naturalisations of Muslims were rare. Doukhan became politically engaged through interactions with Muslim pupils and by reading progressive journals such as La Voix des humbles (founded in 1922 by the secular teacher Saïd Faci), which advocated moral elevation of Muslims without religious dogma. These influences contrasted with the rise of Algerian nationalism embodied by publications and movements such as Ferhat Abbas' Le Jeune Algérien (1931), the Association of Muslim Scholars (1931) and Messali Hadj's Étoile nord-africaine (1926), later the Parti du peuple algérien (1937).

On leaving the École normale with the brevet supérieur (equivalent to the baccalauréat), Fernand was appointed teacher at the Maison-Blanche (Dar El Beïda) boys' primary school in 1933, twenty kilometres from Algiers—his first regular teaching post and entry into the profession amid emerging colonial dynamics.

=== Military service and captivity during the Second World War (1939–1945) ===
Archival research in July 2009 at the Bureau of Archives of Victims of Contemporary Conflicts in Caen revealed details of Doukhan's captivity during WWII. Documents from stalag registers and a repatriation medical record confirm his internment from 1940 to 1945, including hospitalisation in October 1944 for gastritis, chronic bronchitis and dental infections. Microfilm photocopies show his transit through Compiègne before transfer to Nazi camps; he concealed his Jewish identity by using a francised paternal first name ("Raoul" instead of "Saül") to avoid persecution specific to Jewish prisoners.

Mobilised on 2 September 1939, 26 years old and then a teacher in the HBM housing estates at Le Ruisseau (El Annasser) in Algiers, Doukhan joined the 9th Regiment of Zouaves, an Algerian unit with historical prestige. Despite latent antisemitism in the army (illustrated by a telegram refusing Jewish reinforcements), he trained in Sousse, Tunisia—an environment marked by epidemics—and was deployed to the Saar/Moselle region in France. He served during the "Phoney War" until the German offensive; the regiment retreated and suffered heavy casualties. Captured on 12 June near Crépy-en-Valois, he was transferred to Frontstalag de Compiègne, then Stalag II-D (Stargard) and later Stalag V-C (Offenburg), where he endured forced labour, confiscation of possessions and poor conditions. He was registered under number 66060 and photographed during captivity.

Concurrently in Vichy Algeria, the Crémieux Decree was abrogated on 7 October 1940 by Marshal Pétain, revoking French citizenship from indigenous Jews and restoring them to the status of "indigènes" under racial laws. This produced professional numerus clausus, educational exclusions and internments; many Jewish soldiers suffered internment in camps such as Bedeau (Oranie) 1941–1943. Saül Doukhan died on 18 January 1944, shortly after the decree's restoration in October 1943 following the Allied landings (Operation Torch). Clarisse, Fernand's mother, rarely mentioned these events in letters, including the death of great-aunt Messaouda in 1943, who had reverted to indigenous status after some seventy years of citizenship.

Liberated by American troops in late April 1945, Doukhan walked to Paris over two weeks then took a train to Marseille and reached Algiers six days after the German surrender (8 May 1945). His return coincided with the Sétif, Guelma and Kherrata massacres (8 May 1945), events that confirmed for him the fragility of peace in Algeria and the violent depth of colonial tensions.

=== Teaching career and anti-colonial engagement (1945–1954) ===
After 1945 Doukhan taught at the Lazerges school (Nelson district) in Algiers, instructing CM1 classes in a modest, ethnically mixed establishment. He was strict yet learned, promoting secular Republican education and discipline. The Nelson district reflected a cosmopolitan social life; anecdotes from former pupils and colleagues recall the local atmosphere and political incidents of the period.

An anarchist activist from 1948 following contact with Georges Fontenis, he refused the Legion of Honour in 1950 and wrote in Le Libertaire, denouncing colonialism and foregrounding socio-economic inequalities in Algeria. During the start of the Algerian War (Toussaint rouge, 1954) he expressed support for the FLN in print and condemned repression, honouring the memory of the murdered teacher Guy Monnerot. His Jewish family, divided between national loyalties, sided with independence, aligning with his radical anticolonial stance.

=== Anti-colonial activism and police repression (1954–1956) ===
Interviews compiled in December 2008 with Léandre Valéro (born 1923), an Oran-based anarchist of Spanish origin, document Doukhan's involvement in the MLNA, founded in 1950 in Algiers. Valéro recounted the MLNA premises on Avenue de la Marne serving as a cultural hub and clandestine print shop for around ten activists.

The "Toussaint rouge" (1 November 1954: some 70 attacks, eight dead, including Guy Monnerot) galvanized their activism. Together with Jean Duteuil, Doukhan and Valéro backed Messali Hadj's MNA (recreated December 1954) via clandestine leaflets, logistical aid and FCL posters proclaiming "Long live free Algeria!". In Le Libertaire Doukhan denounced torture, concentration camps and 124 years of colonial exploitation, demanding self-determination and withdrawal of the French contingent.

Anarchists and Trotskyists were a minority—around 400 in France and only a few dozen in Algeria—and stood apart from the dominant pro-French Algeria consensus (figures such as Pierre Mendès France, François Mitterrand, Guy Mollet and the French Communist Party). Repression intensified: surveillance, seizures and arrests (Doukhan arrested in 1949; Pierre Morain in 1955), despite protests from intellectuals like Albert Camus.

Internal divisions (Spanish anarchists in favour of French Algeria versus pro-MNA elements) and FLN rivalry (resulting in fratricidal violence; around 10,000 deaths and episodes such as the Melouza massacre in 1957) weakened the MLNA. Arrests in July 1956 (including Fontenis) led to the dissolution of the FCL and increased clandestinity. Valéro fled to France; archives and many materials were destroyed or lost. Exhausted by 43, Doukhan expected internment as repression escalated.

=== Arrest during the Battle of Algiers (1957) ===
An interview with Marguerite (Fernand Doukhan's widow) in 2008 recalled his traumatic arrest during the Algerian War, corroborated by administrative archives. This episode exemplifies the severe repression of European supporters of independence, including European anarchist militants like Doukhan.

On 28 January 1957 Doukhan participated in the general eight-day strike intended to influence the United Nations debate on self-determination. Despite a state of emergency (declared April 1955) and special powers (March 1956) permitting searches and detentions without trial, Doukhan observed the strike from his home on Rue du Roussillon in Bab El Oued. Algiers was paralysed—shops closed, transport disrupted and power cuts. General Jacques Massu, invested with broad authority since January, deployed some 5,000 paratroopers to break the strike during the Battle of Algiers, dismantling the FLN after deadly attacks (15 fatalities in January).

In the afternoon four paratroopers raided Doukhan's apartment, threatening him with mock execution before an officer intervened. Handcuffed and stripped of personal effects, he was taken with about a dozen European strikers (rail workers, postmen, a chemist) to the Ben Aknoun sorting centre—one of twelve detention sites in Algiers used for repression (including Villa Sésini where Henri Alleg was tortured). There he endured nocturnal interrogations by searchlight, slaps and deprivation (sleeping on the floor, minimal rations); interrogators sought his Casbah contacts and "Arab friends". While he was not physically tortured (gégène, "water-torture" bathtub), the atmosphere was terrorising, echoing methods denounced since the Vichy era. In the months that followed, thousands disappeared or were executed; notable cases included Maurice Audin and Larbi Ben M'hidi.

Ten days later Doukhan received a residence-order (6 February 1957) for "offences against public security and order", citing his articles in Le Libertaire, anti-colonial posters and participation in the strike.

=== Internment at Lodi camp and expulsion from Algeria (1957–1958) ===
The Camp of Lodi, established in 1955 near Médéa, was a unique element in the colonial repression system: it was the only internment camp reserved for Europeans suspected of sympathising with the Algerian national movement. Created under the state of emergency and the special powers regime, it held between 140 and 150 detainees—mostly former members of the dissolved Algerian Communist Party, but also syndicalists, lawyers and libertarian militants arrested for political opinions. Among them was anarchist teacher Fernand Doukhan, arrested in February 1957 and interned for thirteen months.

Living conditions at Lodi, while less brutal than those in Muslim camps such as Djelfa or Aïn Oussera (Paul-Cazelles), were nonetheless marked by overcrowding, cold, restricted rations and constant censorship. Interned men were kept under strict isolation and surveillance but organised educational, cultural and sporting activities—courses, debates, theatre—to resist boredom and arbitrariness. Collective petitions to Resident Minister Robert Lacoste denounced internment without trial and violations of fundamental rights.

Henri Alleg's passage through the camp in 1957—after his torture at El Biar and his clandestine writing of La Question—gave symbolic weight to Lodi in the public denunciation of colonial abuses. The camp closed in 1960; several former internees continued anticolonial engagement and later participated in Franco-Algerian solidarity after independence. Doukhan was released in March 1958 and subsequently expelled from Algeria.

=== Exile in metropolitan France and final years (1958–1996) ===
Expelled from Algeria in April 1958 for his anticolonial activism, Doukhan settled in Montpellier where, supported by the National Teachers' Union, he resumed teaching. Marginalised and isolated in metropolitan France, he nevertheless continued political activity within École émancipée and later the Parti des travailleurs, shifting from anarchism toward Trotskyism. Algerian independence led to the dispersion of his family; he took in his mother Clarisse until her death in 1970. Married in 1964 to Marguerite Hoarau, he devoted his retirement to union activism and internationalism. He died in 1996 following an accident and reportedly left his possessions to his political party, a sign of sustained fidelity to his emancipation ideals. His trajectory illustrates the tragic fate of a Jewish Algerian republican and anticolonial teacher, marginalised from official memory but faithful to justice and solidarity until his death.

== Works ==
=== Articles ===
- En Afrique du Nord. A propos d’un plan, Le Libertaire, no. 246, 8 December 1950.
- Dictature française en Algérie. Un coup de force, Le Libertaire, no. 320, 19 June 1952.
- Le problème syndical en Afrique du Nord, Le Libertaire, no. 360, 14 May 1953.
- Mauvaise foi et colonialisme éclairé, Le Libertaire, no. 404, 11 November 1954.
- Un aveu. Soutiens du colonialisme, Le Libertaire, no. 406, 25 November 1954.
- Protestation du M.L.N.A., Le Libertaire, no. 402, 28 October 1954.
- La faune colonialiste de l’Assemblée algérienne, Le Libertaire, no. 412, 6 January 1955.
- De la nomination de Soustelle aux interpellations sur l’Afrique du Nord. Règlement de comptes, Le Libertaire, no. 416, 3 February 1955.
- D’Alger, solidarité néo-colonialiste I, Le Libertaire, no. 419, 24 February 1955.
- D’Alger, solidarité néo-colonialiste II, Le Libertaire, no. 420, 3 March 1955.
- Misère de l’école publique en Algérie ou l’impuissance du réformisme I, Le Libertaire, no. 426, 14 April 1955.
- Misère de l’école publique en Algérie ou l’impuissance du réformisme II, Le Libertaire, no. 427, 21 April 1955.

== Bibliography ==
- Funès, Nathalie, Mon oncle d'Algérie, Paris: Stock, 2010.
- Bouba, Philippe, L’Anarchisme en situation coloniale, le cas de l’Algérie. Organisations, militants et presse, 1887–1962, PhD thesis, University of Perpignan and University of Oran Es-Senia, 2014.
- Boulouque, Sylvain, Les Anarchistes français face aux guerres coloniales (1945–1962), Lyon: Atelier de création libertaire, 2003.
- Fontenis, Georges; Valéro, Léandre; Berger, Denis; Bourgeois, Guy, L'insurrection algérienne et les communistes libertaires, Paris: Alternative Libertaire, 2024.
- Fontenis, Georges, Changer le monde. Histoire du mouvement communiste libertaire 1945–1997, Paris: Alternative Libertaire, 2008.
- Pattieu, Sylvain, Les Camarades des frères. Trotskistes et libertaires dans la guerre d’Algérie, Paris: Syllepse, 2002.
- Saadi, Yacef, La Bataille d’Alger. Le démantèlement, vol. 3, Algiers: Casbah Éditions, 1997.
- Thénault, Sylvie, Une drôle de justice. Les magistrats dans la guerre d’Algérie, Paris: La Découverte, 2004.

== See also ==
- Libertarian socialism
- Libertarian communism
- Mohamed Saïl
- Abdelemoune
- Messali Hadj
- Mouvement national algérien
- Front de libération nationale (Algeria)
- Battle of Algiers
- Anarchism in Algeria
