= Flag of Algeria =

People's Democratic Republic of Algeria
- Use: National flag, civil and state ensign
- Proportion: 2:3
- Adopted: 3 July 1962; 64 years ago
- Design: A vertical bicolor of green and white, with the red crescent encircling the red five-pointed star centered along the dividing line.
- Designed by: National Liberation Front of Algeria
- Use: Presidential standard
- Proportion: 2:3
- Use: Naval ensign
- Proportion: 2:3
- Adopted: 27 June 1963 (amended in 1995)
- Design: As above, with white crossed fouled anchors in the canton.
- Use: Naval jack
- Design: The national flag in the canton on a light blue field.

The national flag of Algeria consists of two equal vertical bars, green and white, charged in the center with a red star and crescent, a symbol of Islam as the nation's prominent faith. The flag was adopted on 3 July 1962. A similar version was used by the Algerian government in exile from 1958 to 1962. The Western blazon is per pale vert and argent; a crescent and star gules.

== Description ==
Algerian ships fly it as their ensign, except for ships of the Algerian National Navy, which use one charged with two white crossed anchors in the canton as the naval ensign. Formerly, the two crossed anchors in the canton were red.

According to algeria-un.org, cited in 1999, the features of the flag are set down precisely, being described as:

The green must be a composition of equal yellow and blue having, according to the diagram of contrasts of Rood, a wavelength of 5,411 [ångströms] and the position 600 on the normal spectrum. The red must be pure, of primary non-decomposable colour, and exempt of blue and yellow having, according to the above-indicated diagram, a wavelength of 6,562 [ångströms] and the position 285 on the normal spectrum.

Scheme	Red	Green	White
Pantone (Paper)	186 C	356 C	White
Web colours	#C8102E	#007A33	#FFFFFF
RGB	200, 16, 46	0, 122, 51	255, 255, 255
CMYK	0%, 92%, 77%, 22%	100%, 0%, 58%, 52%	0%, 0%, 0%, 0%

== Symbolism ==
Flag of the Barbarossa brothers

Flag of Ahmed Bey's eastern beylik

There is no disagreement among Algerian, Islamic, and even foreign sources that the reference for the green color is Islamic. Ottoman admiral and ruler of the regency of Algiers Hayreddine Barbarossa adopted this color as an Islamic emblem in his wars against the Christian powers. The same color was later adopted by Algerian corsair Raïs Hamidou, and later by the leader of the Algerian resistance Emir Abdelkader, and the chief of the 1871 Kabyle uprising Hadj Mokrani. In the twentieth century, it was again taken up by the Algerians who demonstrated in the city of Skikda in 1910. It also appeared in the banner raised following the uprising in southern Constantine in 1917. In 1920 the French deputy Motier referred to it when addressing the Algerian-French elected representatives, saying: “Your policy will drive the Muslims to gather behind their green flag.” The Étoile Nord-Africaine later adopted it in 1934, and key national figure Messali Hadj considered this color to be the flag of Islam.

The color red carries the meaning of jihad. According to Professor Abdeljelil Temimi, the origin of this choice goes back to the Rightly Guided Caliphs and then specifically to Caliph Umar. Red was the color of the flags of the Ottoman Sipahi cavalry in early modern times. It is also worth noting in European sources that the red hat called "fez" remained a symbol of the Islamic caliphate until its fall after the First World War and adorned the heads of millions of people across the Islamic world. Hadj Messali remained faithful to this tradition until his death.

The white color is also religious and related to jihad. The Prophet Muhammad gave a white banner to the Companion Mus‘ab ibn ‘Umayr at the Battle of Badr. In modern times, the Ottoman Sultan Selim I used flags combining red and white when he conquered Egypt in 1517. White was also introduced into the Algerian flag from the eighteenth century onward, as the flag of Ahmed Bey contained white, and so did the banner of Emir Abdelkader.

The shapes that appear on the national flag are represented first with the crescent as a symbol of Islam since it is the basis of the Hijri calendar. The flag of Ottoman Algerian Ibrahim Bey was decorated with a half-crescent. The Christians themselves regard the crescent as a symbol of Islam: American historian John Wolf wrote that “(…) in the sixteenth and early seventeenth centuries, when the crescent stood face to face with the cross in the Mediterranean and the Danube basins.” The French Foreign Minister Georges Bidault likewise considered it as such.

The origin of the star accompanying the crescent on the Algerian flag is unquestionably Ottoman-Islamic. It goes back to the banners of the corsair captains, which were studded with stars. Although it is unknown whether those stars were five-pointed or of another form, as no further information has been found beyond what was reported by Wolf. According to Algerian specialist in the history of the Ottoman period in Algeria, Nacereddine Saïdouni, the five-pointed star symbolized either the five pillars of Islam or the five daily prayers. The star then appeared accompanying the crescent on the Arab-Ottoman flag raised by Algerian protestors in 1912. It later figured on the membership stamp of the Étoile Nord-Africaine, then of the Parti du Peuple Algérien, and also at the top of the newspaper El Ouma, always together with the crescent.

There are still different interpretations of the Algerian flag elements. According to Malek Chebel, green represents Islam and white represents purity. For Pierre Lux-Wurm, green and white bring to mind the ancient banners of Islam from the time of the Prophet Muhammad, while the crescent and star can be seen as symbols of light. According to Khaled Merzouk, the green stripe represents the earth and agriculture, the white stripe represents peace and the crescent and star are symbols of Islam. The star represents the five pillars of Islam. Benjamin Stora suggests that the three colors of the flag originally represented the three countries of the Maghreb and the ideas of union.

== History ==
=== Middle Ages ===
During the Middle Ages, various Islamic dynasties governed regions that are now part of modern-day Algeria, each controlling different territories over time. Unlike today, national flags in the modern sense did not exist. Instead, dynastic banners were used, and their colors often reflected political and religious affiliations. Black banners were commonly associated with Sunni Abbasid suzerainty and were used by the Aghlabids, Zirids, and Almoravids. In contrast, white banners symbolized caliphal authority and were favored by the Umayyads, Fatimids, and their earlier Zirid vassals, as well as the Almohads, and their successor states—the Hafsids, Zayyanids, and Marinids.

It is possible to distinguish, using various sources, certain constants, such as the presence of a crescent with variable orientation and the presence of the colors red, blue and white.

Flag of Kingdom of Tlemcen according to the Portolan chart.

Flag of Kingdom of Tlemcen on Pietro Vescontes' map.

Flag of Béjaïa according to the Book of Knowledge of All Kingdoms and Catalan Atlas.

=== Regency of Algiers ===
==== Red, yellow and green flags ====
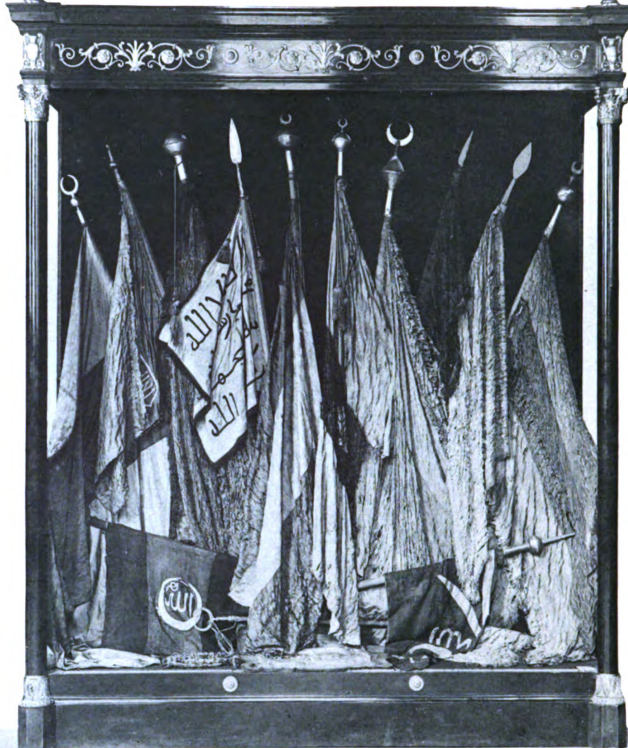
“2 to 4. Algerian flags from the capture of Algiers (July 5, 1830). 24.Three horizontal bands, yellow, green and red.” (first one on the right), from the Army Museum in 1907, Paris.

According to the historian ʿAbd al-Rahman al-Jilali, Aruj Barbarossa liberated Algiers from Spanish control in 1516 and consolidated his rule by raising a symbolic flag composed of green, yellow, and red colors. This early flag signaled a rupture from the Christian power of Spain and laid the foundation for a new Islamic polity. Al-Jilali emphasizes that while Hayreddin Barbarossa was engaged in campaigns elsewhere, Aruj secured the city and adopted this tricolor as a mark of his authority. Historians Ahmed Tewfik El Madani and Othman Kaak add that Aruj became the sole authority in Algiers and “raised his banners of three colors above its walls and castles,” further noting the symbolic assertion of rule by minting coins bearing his emblem and the inscription “Minted in Algiers.” Similarly, the historians Nadir Assari and Mouloud Gaïd confirm that during the Turkish period, the flag consisted of three horizontal silk bands in these colors.

The flag’s presence was not limited to the battlefield or palace gates. It also appeared in art and cartography. Tarek Kahlaoui reports that a 1551 Ottoman atlas by Al-Sharafi depicts Algiers under a flag with horizontal red, yellow, and green stripes—a rare early example of Algerian symbolism in Islamic cartography. The red-yellow-green tricolor, though locally adopted by the Barbarossa brothers, likely held layered meanings. As Historian Jeanette M. Fregulia observes, the flag's resemblance to those found in other Ottoman administrative centers suggests a dual identity: an expression of local autonomy within a broader Ottoman imperial context. The flag may have marked the seat of the Pasha, the Sultan’s representative in Algiers, while simultaneously asserting the military and political authority of the Regency itself. One variant was considered a war flag according to Bertrand Dubreuil.

Foreign travelers and chroniclers also observed the flag. American prisoner in Algiers in the late 18th century James Leander Cathcart describes the flagstaff on the Dey’s palace, topped with a gilt crescent and used to fly both "the national banners and those of the Ottoman Sultan and the Prophet Muhammad" on Fridays and festivals. 19th century French historian Léon Galibert, cited by Historian Mouloud Kacem Naît Belkacem, describes the "great national flag of Algiers" as consisting of three bands of silk—red, green, and yellow—displayed majestically above the Bab-Azoun gate.

According to 19th century French authors, this flag flew from prominent locations across the city throughout the 16th and 17th centuries: over gates like Bab Azoun, atop the Djennina Palace, and across terraces overlooking the sea. The Fondation de la régence d'Alger, a chronicle based on 16th-century Arabic sources, confirms that the standard of red, yellow, and green floated over the Djenina palace—a visual assertion of power visible from land and sea. In his 1887 work L'Algérie qui s'en va, Marius Bernard gives further specificity: the flag’s arrangement featured red at the top, green in the middle, and yellow at the bottom, flown on a long pole “on which the insolent flag of the Regency flew for so long.”

==== Dey-Pasha flags ====
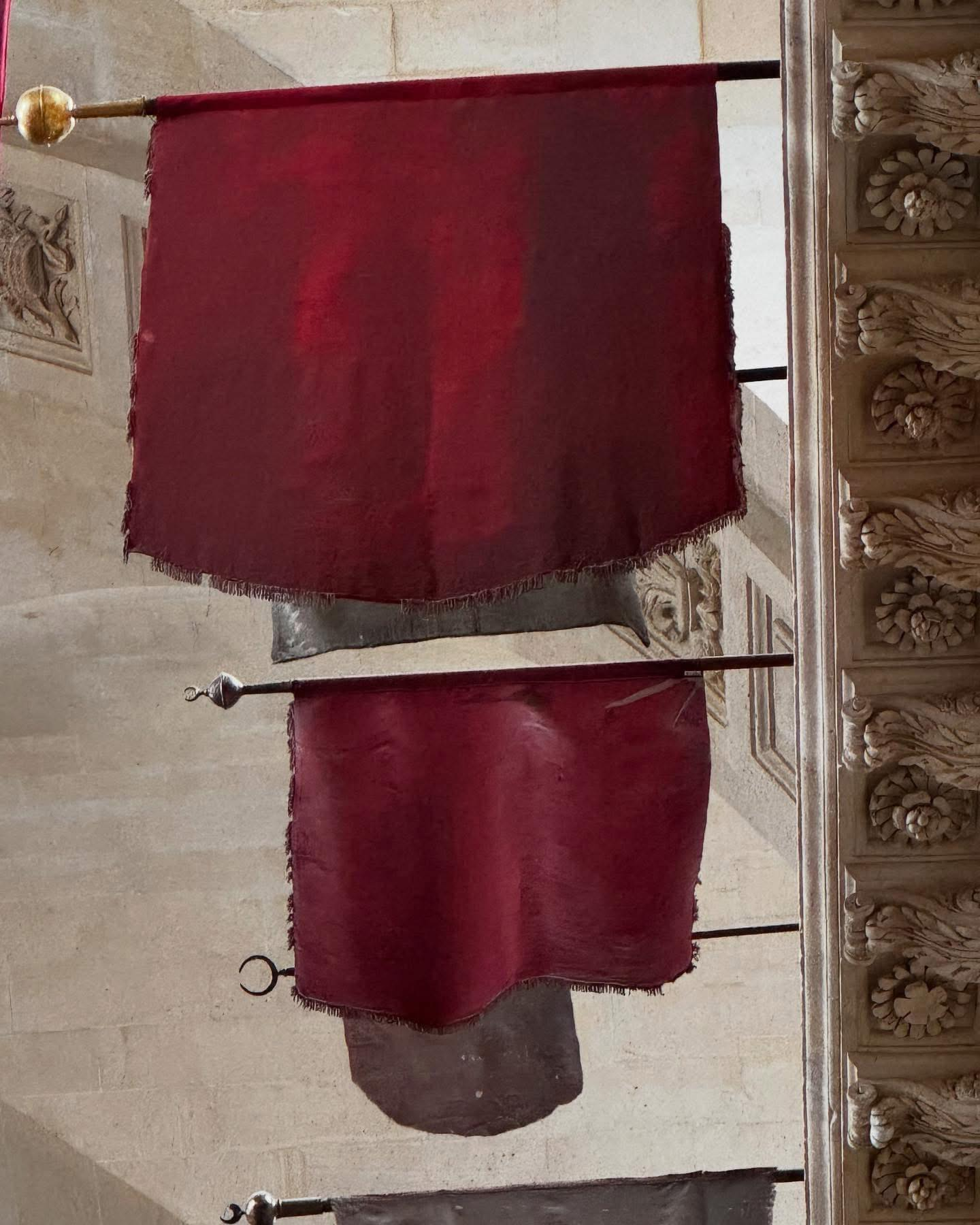
Red flags of Algiers displayed as war trophies in the cathedral of Saint-Louis-des-Invalides, Paris.

Multiple historical sources affirm the prominence of an all-red flag as the primary emblem of the Algerian state. Achour Cheurfi notes that “in 1830, when the French invaded the country, Hussein Dey’s army flew an all-red flag.” Similarly, Historian Moulay Belhamissi describes a large, plain red flag raised above the Dey’s belvedere, mounted on a mast topped with a copper ball. This flag, according to Belhamissi, was hoisted on holidays across ports, while on the Kasbah, a green standard embroidered with gold was sometimes raised for ceremonial occasions.

Historian Abd al-Rahman al-Jilali, writing in Arabic, adds a critical dimension to the flag’s political symbolism: it was “devoid of any symbol, a deliberate departure from the Ottoman imperial flags, which bore crescents and stars.” According to him, this absence represented the regency’s assertion of de facto independence. While the Dey maintained formal recognition of Ottoman authority, the distinct red banner underscored local power. Occasionally, a crescent alone was added, and other flags with various emblems were used to distinguish sea vessels. Historian Dane A. Morrison similarly references the lowering of a "federal flag of the United States" and the hoisting of "the red pennant of Algiers" highlighting its symbolic humiliation inflicted to U.S. Captain William Bainbridge prior to the start of the First Barbary War.

The red banner’s placement atop the Kasbah was particularly meaningful. Older authors such as Camille Rousset recounts a moment during Dey Ali Khodja's rule, when the people of Algiers were surprised to find the red flag—typically flown over the Djennina palace—now at the summit of the Kasbah citadel, signaling the Dey's new seat of power. During the bombardment of Algiers, a Royal Navy officer onboard HMS Queen Charlotte recalled seeing an enormous crimson flag "waving slowly and majestically" over the Dey’s palace. It was rumored to be made of silk and decorated with silver stars and crescents, though the officer admitted they could not clearly discern these elements. The flag was reported to have been taken by the French army from atop the Kabah citadel during the invasion of Algiers in 1830.

Simple tricolor of the Regency of Algiers.

Colours of Algiers.

Flag of Algiers (Al-Sharafīʼs Ottoman atlas of 1551)

Flag of the Beylerbey-Pasha-Dey of Algiers

Flag of the Dey of Algiers according to the album by John Beaumont (1705).

==== Naval flags ====
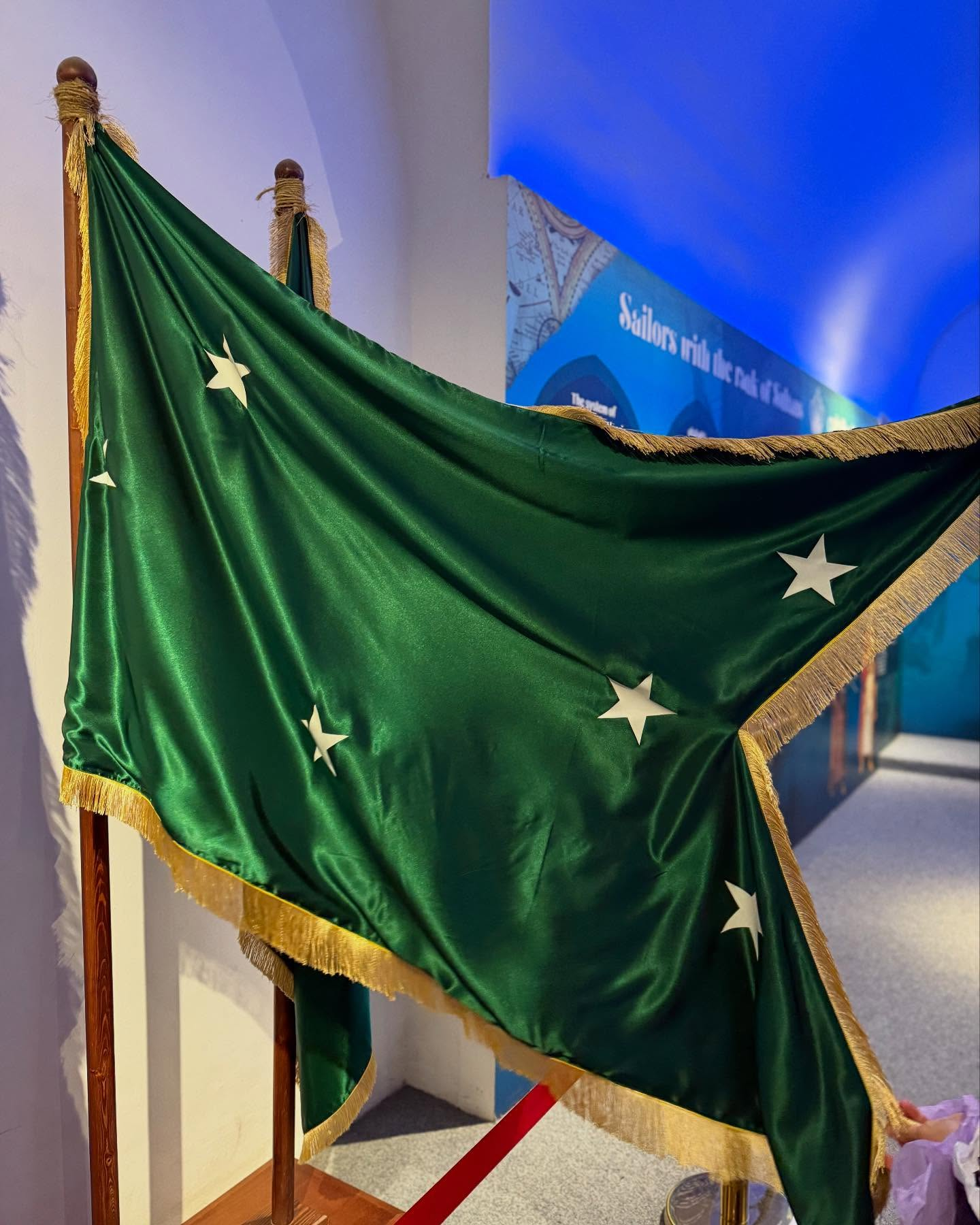
Star spangled green flag of the Ottoman Algerian corsairs. National maritime museum of Algiers.

The Barbary corsairs of Ottoman Algeria between the 15th and 17th century widely used flags that were emblazoned with one or more crescents. These could however vary greatly in color, with dark red, black, green and white being in use. Besides these, Algerian corsairs also used various flags in plain color, such as plain black ones signalling death. Less often, Algerian flags of this time also carried other motifs, such as suns, stars and crossed swords. Wolf indicates that the corsairs of Algiers flew the star spangled green banner. This account was also mentioned by the French historian Michel Pierre, who also noted that the corsairs used the plain red flag more often by the late period of the Regency.

Algerian Land forces Flag (Odjak of Algiers), during the conquest, the French captured about 100 with varying numbers of red and yellow stripes.

Regimental Flag of Algiers from "The maritime flags of all nations" (1832), by Richard Holmes Laurie (1777–1858)

Pavilion of the Regency of Algiers (17th-18th centuries).

Pavilion of the regency of Algiers.

Flag of the official in charge of the fleet.

Pavilion of the Regency of Algiers.

One of the types of merchant flags of Regency of Algiers.

Merchant flag of the regency of Algiers
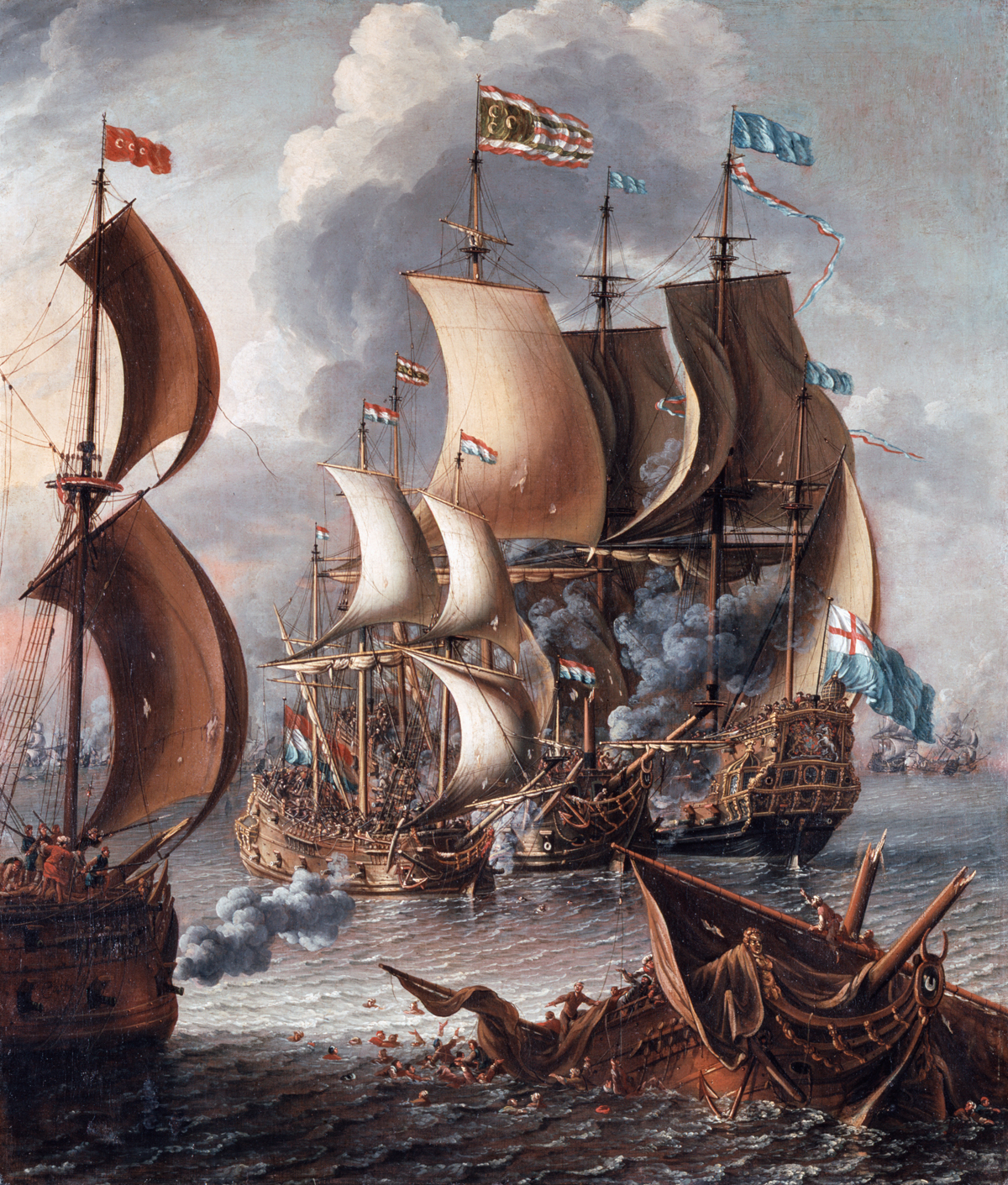
A Sea Fight with Barbary Corsairs by Laureys a Castro, c. 1681. Note the various flags with crescents used by the pirates.

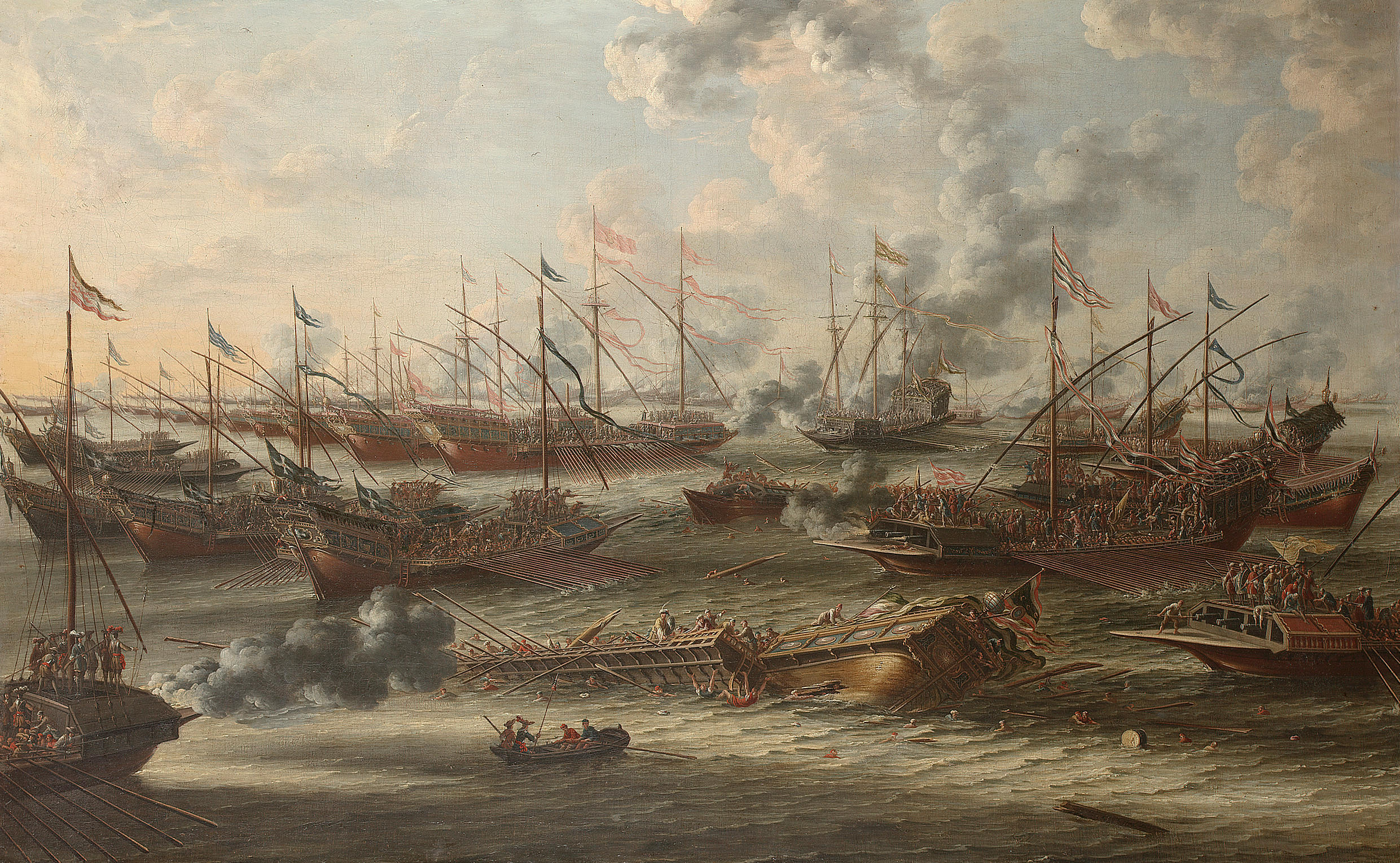
Laureys a Castro: The Battle of Lepanto (Barbary corsair fleet on the right)

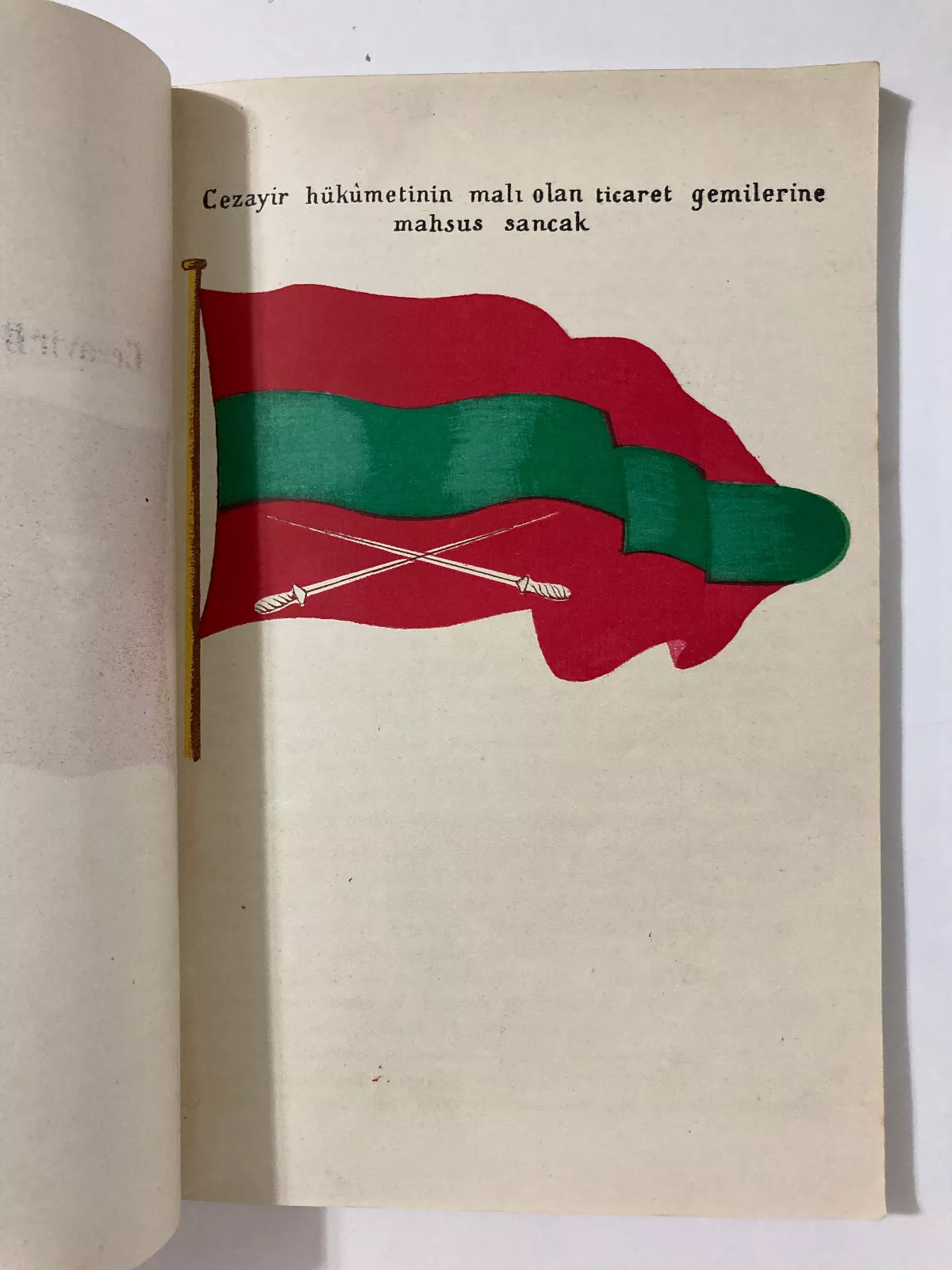
Merchant flag of Algiers in Turkish Military Naval Magazine On Algeria History Piracy Flags 1930, by ALİ HAYDAR EMİR

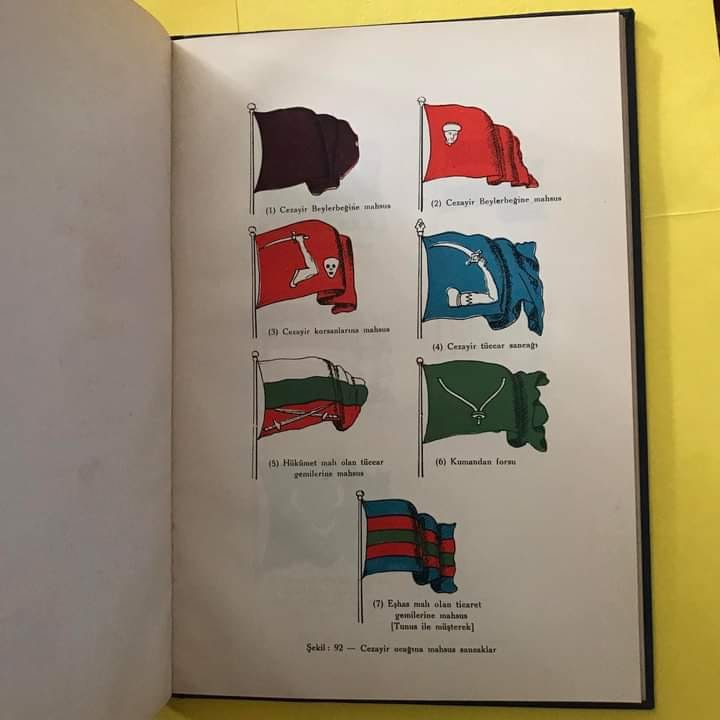
Plain red and head flags as beylerbey ensigns in Kurtoğlu, Fevzi (1987). Türk bayrağı ve ay yıldız (in Turkish). Türk Tarih Kurumu.

=== French Algeria ===
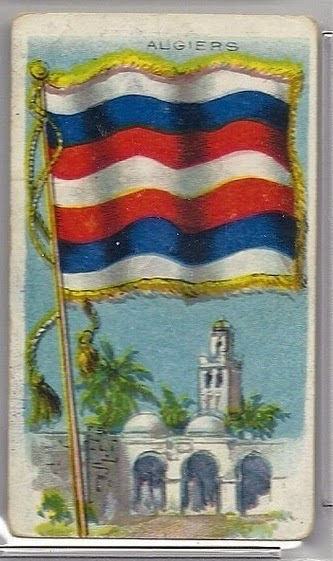
Cigarette card using the merchant flag as an Algerian flag

Flag of Governor General of French Algeria Pélissier

Merchant flag of French Algeria

Flag used by France in Algeria when as a colony and later a part of France

French Algeria was the period of Algerian history when the country was a colony and later a part of France, for this reason the official flag was the flag of France. The French invasion began at a time when France used a solid white flag, but during the campaign, as a result of the July Revolution in metropolitan France, the tricolor was adopted, which remained in use until the independence of the Republic of Algeria in 1962. In the 19th century there was a merchant flag used on ships coming from Algeria and it was adopted after 1848, when the territories in Algeria were integrated with Metropolitan France, creates the multicolored motifs of the striped flags of the regency. The exact rules and years of use of the striped flag are unknown. The misrepresentation of the merchant flag as the main flag of French Algeria has been happening since the 19th century.

=== Emirate of Abdelkader ===
Flag of the Emirate of Abdelkader (1832–1847)

Regimental flag

Flag captured by the French

The Emirate of Abdelkader or Emirate of Mascara was a sovereign country founded by Abdelkader al-Jazairi with the allegiance of the people of Algeria to resist the French conquest of Algeria with its first capital at Mascara then Tagdemt after it was taken by France. Many flags were used in the emirate, but the most important is the green and white one used at Abdelkader's tent. In the white center was a raised hand of Fatima drawn surrounded by the words in gold "victory from Allah and the reconquest is near, and the victory by Emir Abdelkader". Copies of this flag, although different in proportions, are kept in the Emir Abdelkader Museum in Miliana

=== History of the current flag ===
One of the flags used in the Sétif revolt (1945)

Flag of Algerian nationalists from Democratic Union of the Algerian Manifesto.

One of many variants of the flag used by Algierian nationalists before gaining independence.

One of many variants of the flag used by Algierian nationalists before gaining independence.
One of many variants before it was standardized in 1963.

One of many variants before it was standardized in 1963.

One of many variants before it was standardized in 1963.

The North African Star (ENA) Association was preserved in 1926, with Messali Hadj as its chairman, and one of its members was the grandson of the Emir Abdelkader, Khalid ibn Hashim. Since 1926, this organization has used a green flag with the words "Algeria our country, Arabic our language and Islam our religion".

While there is some dispute over who exactly designed the green and white with red star and crescent symbol, Émilie Busquant, wife of the Algerian nationalist leader Messali Hadj, is generally credited as having sewed the first version of the flag in 1934.

Historian Benjamin Stora explains that it was during a meeting of the ENA, in 1934, that the colors of the flag were chosen, after which Émilie Busquant was tasked with sewing it. However, René Gallissot and Anissa Bouayed affirm that this is not the first appearance of the Algerian flag, as Algerian trade union demonstrators displayed this same flag (green and white with a red star and crescent) during the May Day parades in 1919 and 1920, in France and Algeria.

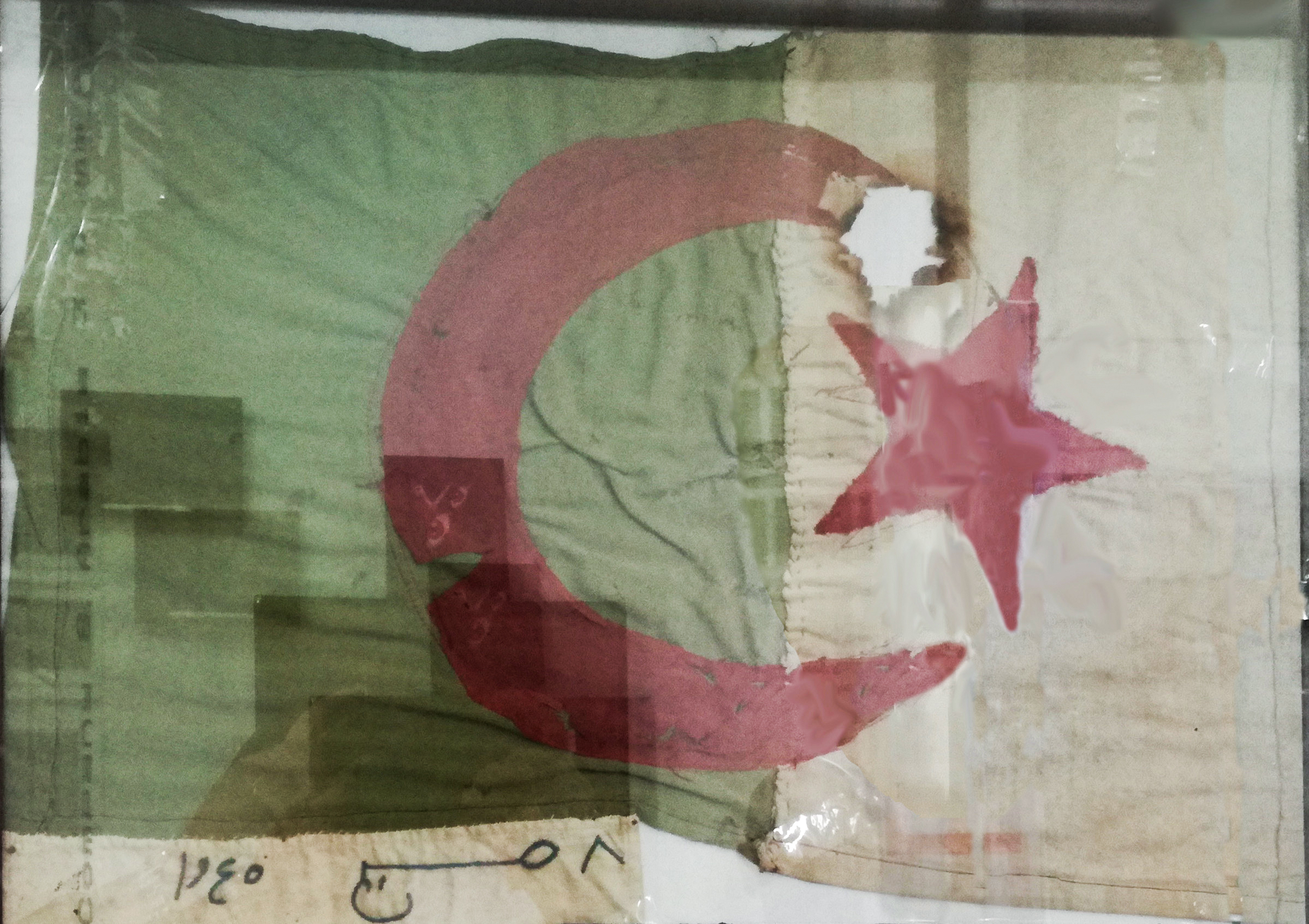
Bouzid Saâla's example of the flag was made by PPA activists and is currently kept in the museum in Sétif.

Research by historian Mohamed Ghnanèche shows that in 1940, another flag was adopted with a red star and a white crescent placed above the center. It was then transformed by the Algerian People's Party (PPA) to its current form in 1943. According to Achour Cheurfi, the design of the current flag comes from PPA independence activists who, around 1944, commissioned a limited group to select the flag, raising it for the first time during the demonstration in Sétif. During these events, it was carried, among others, by Bouzid Saâl, a student who as later killed by the French police.

The green and white flag marked with a star and a red crescent was adopted by the National Liberation Front (FLN), which led the fight against France and was subsequently adopted in 1958 by the Provisional Government of the Algerian Republic. It was raised at the Monrovia Conference in August 1959, where it was officially recognized by several African countries. It is then formalized and standardized by the law of 25 April 1963.

== Unicode ==
The flag of Algeria is represented as the Unicode emoji sequence U+1F1E9 🇩 REGIONAL INDICATOR SYMBOL LETTER D and U+1F1FF 🇿 REGIONAL INDICATOR SYMBOL LETTER Z, making "🇩🇿".

== See also ==
- Emblem of Algeria
- List of Algerian flags

== Bibliography ==
- Bowles, Carington (1783), Bowles's universal display of the naval flags of all nations in the world, London
- Chebel, Malek (2001). Dictionnaire des symboles musulmans. Éditions Albin Michel.
- Cheurfi, Achour (2004). La révolution algérienne (1954-1962): Dictionnaire biographique (in French). Casbah éditions. ISBN 978-9961-64-478-2.
- Konstam, Angus (2016). The Barbary Pirates. 15th–17th Centuries. Oxford: Osprey Publishing. ISBN 978-1-4728-1543-9.
- Lux-Wurm, Pierre (2001). Les drapeaux de l'islam (in French). Buchet-Chastel. ISBN 978-2-283-01813-2.
- Merzouk, Khaled (2008). Messali Hadj et ses compagnons a Tlemecen : récits et anecdotes de son époque, 1898-1974 (in French). El Dar El Othmania.
- الجيلالي [Al-Jilali], عبد الرحمن [Abdul Rahman] (1994). تاريخ الجزائر العام للعلامة عبد الرحمن الجيلالي الجزء الثالث: الخاص بالفترة بين 1514 إلى 1830م [The General History of Algeria by Abd al-Rahman al-Jilali, Part Three: Concerning the period between 1514 and 1830 AD] (in Arabic). Algiers: الشركة الوطنية للنشر والتوزيع [National Publishing and Distribution Company]. ISBN 978-9961-67-222-8.
