= Anarchism in Algeria =

Anarchism in Algeria emerged during the period of French colonization in Algeria. The first manifestatoin of the anarchist movement in Algeria was Revolutionary Action, published in Algiers in 1887.

== The colonial period ==
According to the French historian Gilbert Meynier: "The anticolonialist antecedents of French anarchism do not really make it possible to distinguish it, from the rest of the workers' movement in the colonies. It would be wrong to think that the anarchist tradition was quite anticolonialist. If activists claiming in any way the libertarian / anarchist current could have anti-colonialist positions, it was mainly through antimilitarism or defense, general and global, the oppressed."

As early as the end of the 19th century, numerous groups of political activists (emigrants or exiles of European origin) claimed to be anarchist. Despite their desire to promote anarchism to the entire population of Algeria, the anarchist movement was predominantly European. Article writers, as well as subscribers of the libertarian press, were in their vast majority Europeans from Algeria. It was not until the 1920s that activists of Algerian Arab and Berber origin joined the movement.

=== The libertarian press ===
The first anarchist newspaper, Revolutionary Action, was published in Algiers in 1887. Élisée Reclus participated in anarchist attempts in Algeria to try to found a local labor movement. At that time, some libertarians sympathized with emigrating to Africa for the purpose of "revolutionary propaganda". Over the decades numerous publications emerged printing a variety of anarchist viewpoints, including translations of Peter Kropotkin's works. By 1890, anarchist groups were publishing newspapers and holding public meetings in Algiers, Bab El Oued, Boufarik and Mustapha. These groups refused to send delegates to the Algerian Socialist Congress of 1901, instead standing for the creation of a revolutionary Committee with a single objective: "the Social Revolution".

In 1894, during the repression of January and February 1894, the crackdown extended to anarchists in Algeria, Paul Régnier, Jules Xixonnet, and other companions were arrested after protesting the police raid on the anarchist colony of Tarzout. Anarchist newspapers were banned in Algiers and Mostaganem on 5 January 1894, with police seizing the stocks.

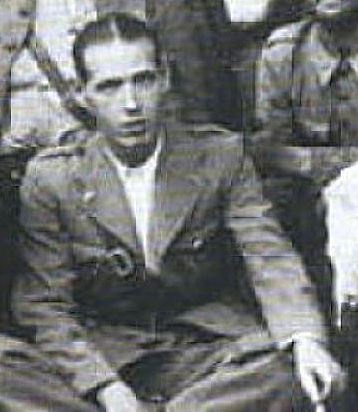
Sail Mohamed, an Algerian anarcho-syndicalist and foreign volunteer in the Durruti Column during the Spanish Civil War.

In 1923, the "Libertarian Federation of North Africa" and its newspaper, Le Flambeau, was established by Algerian anarchists to coordinate Maghrebi libertarians in one and the same political organisation: "Le Flambeau has the ambition to unite all the anarchist comrades, scattered on all sides of our region, in the young and lively anarchist federation of northern French Africa and intensify anarchist propaganda more than ever".

=== Anti-colonialism among French anarchists ===
Robert Louzon was tried in absentia in France for supporting Tunisia's independence movement (publishing a pamphlet entitled "Tunisia for the Tunisians”), condemned to 15 months in prison in July 1939, then arrested in May 1940 for an anti-war pamphlet ("Immediate Peace") written with Louis Lecoin and incarcerated in a detention camp in Algeria. He was released in August 1941.

The French anarcho-syndicalist Émilie Busquant is commonly credited with creating the first copy of the Flag of Algeria. The anarchist Pierre Morain was also the first person from France to be arrested for publicly supporting the cause of Algerian independence.

In the 1950s, the Fédération Communiste Libertaire (FCL) was involved in support for the anti-colonialist struggle in Algeria, resulting in fines, raids, and imprisonments. Rolph Dupuy decisively committed himself against the Algerian War by joining the Front of Solidarity with the Algerian Revolution (FSAR) and by fighting in the frequent street battles between anti-fascists and nationalists or fascists in favour of maintaining French Algeria.

== See also ==
- Category:Algerian anarchists
- List of anarchist movements by region
- Anarchism in Africa
- Anarchism in France
- Anarchism in Morocco
- Anarchism in Tunisia
- North African Libertarian Movement
