= Emblem of Algeria =

Emblem of Algeria (Coat of Arms)

Versions
- Armiger: People's Democratic Republic of Algeria
- Adopted: 15 April 1964
- Shield: At the top, the sun rising over the Atlas Mountains, in the center the Hand of Fatima, symmetrical. the three central fingers together, the two ends of the fingers ended in a dove's beak carrying an olive branch. At the bottom, the crescent and star. On the Right, the ballot box topped with three ears of wheat and oak leaves and left an olive branch with fruit, layered and topped with a palm roof and smokestacks and oil drilling derricks and form of an outside circumference with an inscription in Arabic
- Motto: الجمهورية الجزائرية الديمقراطية الشّعبية "People's Democratic Republic of Algeria"

The national emblem of Algeria (Note: Arabic: الشعار الوطني الجزائري Standard Algerian Berber: ⵜⴰⵎⴰⵜⴰⵔⵜ ⴰⵏⴰⵎⵓⵔ ⵏ ⵍⵣⵣⴰⵢⵔ) is the official seal used by the government of Algeria, which was adopted on April 15, 1964. It is used as the official state symbol on government documents, institutions, and diplomatic representations.

== Description ==
The current form of the emblem with Arabic writing was adopted on 1 November 1976, but was only differentiated from previous one by the changing of the motto from French to Arabic. Contained on the emblem is the crescent that is also found on the flag of Algeria and is a symbol of Islam. The text that encircles the emblem says in Arabic: الجمهورية الجزائرية الديمقراطية الشعبية ("The People's Democratic Republic of Algeria", the country's official name).

The hand of Fatima, a traditional symbol of the region, appears in front of the Atlas Mountains, below a rising sun representing a new era. Buildings stand for industry and plants for agriculture.

== Historic coats of arms and emblems ==
Lesser Coat of arms of the Regency of Algiers (1630–1830)

Great Coat of arms of the Regency of Algiers (1630–1830)

Seal of the Emirate of Abdelkader (1832–1847)

Coat of arms of French Algeria during Second Empire (1865)

Seal of the Government-General of Algeria (1950)

Emblem of the Government-General of Algeria (1962)

Engraving reproducing the official Arabic seal of the Governor General of Algeria

Seal of the Provisional Government of the Algerian Republic (1958–1962)

Emblem of the Republic of Algeria (1962–1971)

Emblem of the Republic of Algeria (1971–1976)

Emblem of the People's Democratic Republic of Algeria (1976–2019)

Emblem of the People's Democratic Republic of Algeria (2019–Present)

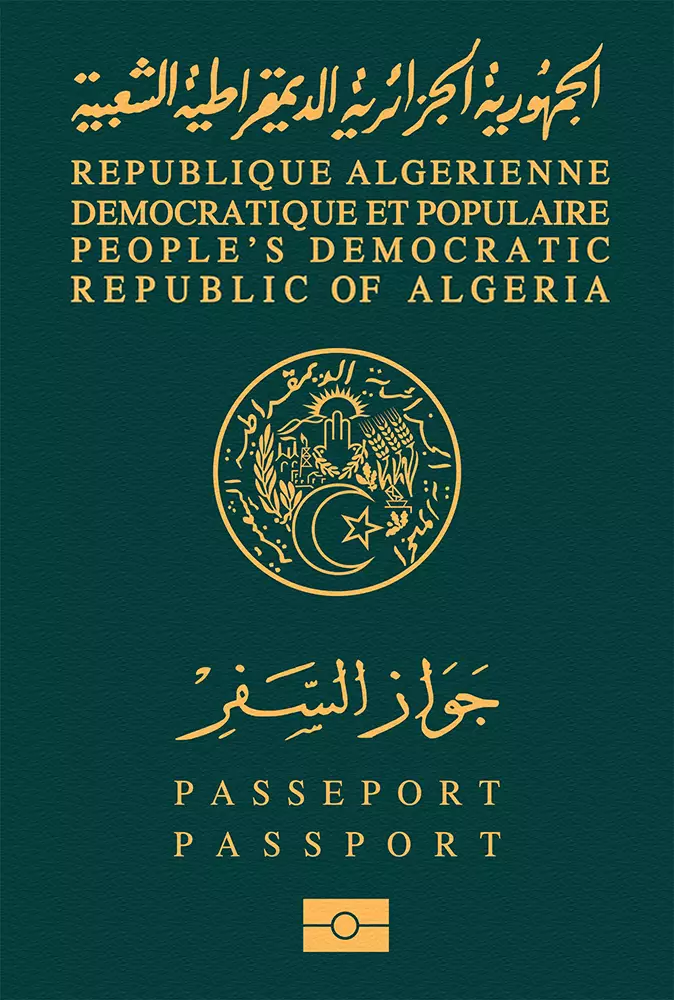
The emblem of Algeria is displayed on the front cover of the current Algerian passport.

== See also ==
- Flag of Algeria
- Algerian national anthem
