= Émilie Busquant =

French-Algerian activist (1901–1953)

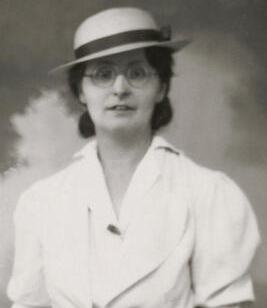
- Émilie Busquant (1942)
- Born: 3 March 1901; Neuves-Maisons, Lorraine, France
- Died: 2 October 1953 (aged 52); Algiers, French Algeria
- Known for: Participation in the creation of Algerian Flag
- Movement: Algerian nationalism, anarcho-syndicalism
- Partner: Messali Hadj

Émilie Busquant (1901–1953) was a French feminist, anarcho-syndicalist and anti-colonial activist who was married to the Algerian nationalist leader Messali Hadj. She is notable for her involvement in the creation of the Algerian flag.

== Biography ==
One of nine children, Émilie grew up in the working-class town of Neuves-Maisons in Eastern France where her father worked in the local steel mill. Her father was involved in anarcho-syndicalism and she was engaged politically from an early age. She moved to Paris and worked in a department store before meeting a young Algerian migrant and political activist, Messali Hadj. As was often the case for working-class couples, they moved in together without officially getting married. Their partnership, which produced two children, was marked by a shared commitment to progressive and anticolonial causes. During Messali's long spells in prison, Émilie often spoke on his behalf and used her position as a Frenchwoman to pour particular scorn on France's declared commitment to "civilising" Algeria.

She is perhaps best known as the creator of the Algerian flag. While there is some dispute over who exactly designed green and white with red star and crescent symbol, Émilie is generally credited as having sewed the first version of the flag.

She died in Algiers in 1953, while her husband was in exile in France. He was refused permission to visit her on her death bed. A cortege of 10,000 followed her coffin, draped in the Algerian flag, through the streets of the Algerian capital on its way to the port. Her funeral in Neuves-Maisons was attended by a delegation from the major parties of the radical Left and her husband, under police surveillance, gave a eulogy recalling her activism and declaring her "the symbol of the union of the Algerian and French peoples in their shared struggle".

Her hometown erected a plaque in her memory on the fiftieth anniversary of her death in 2003 while a 2015 documentary by director Rabah Zanoun introduced a French audience to her story for the first time.

== See also ==
- Algerian War
- Anarchism in Algeria
- Anarchism in France
- Decolonization
