= Lisa Lines =

Australian historian

- Born: Adelaide, Australia
- Occupations: Lecturer in history; Academic editor

Academic background
- Education: University of Adelaide; Flinders University
- Influences: Paul Preston

Academic work
- Era: 18th to 21st century
- Institutions: Capstone Editing; University of South Australia; Elite Editing; University of New South Wales
- Main interests: Modern European history; Military history; Spanish history; Women in combat; Academic integrity and plagiarism
- Notable works: Milicianas (2011)

Lisa Margaret Lines is a former academic editor, historian, author and lecturer in history at the University of New South Wales Canberra. As of December 2025 she is remanded in custody in South Australia, having been charged with a number of serious criminal offences, including attempted murder and conspiracy to commit murder.

== Early life and education ==
Lisa Margaret Lines was born in Adelaide, South Australia.

== Career ==
Lines has lectured at Flinders University, the University of Adelaide, the University of South Australia, and the University of New South Wales.

Lines founded Capstone Editing, a now-defunct editing company.

In 2011 Lines authored a book on milicianas—female participants in the Spanish Civil War—exploring their origins in the Republican reaction to the coup of 1936 and contributions as frontline and rearguard combatants during the first year of the war (after which women were largely removed from combat roles). Lines has also argued for a re-evaluation of General Franco's military leadership, strategy and political acumen during the Spanish Civil War, reasoning that Franco's prolonging of the war was purposefully done to solidify his control of the Nationalist camp, ensure the complete destruction of the Republican forces and establish the foundation for his position as head of state in the post-war years.

== Research ==
Lines has criticised the current climate of Australian universities as overcommercialised, apathetic towards student needs, enabling of a monopolised textbook industry and overpriced textbooks, and unwilling to admit or confront the rising issue of ghostwriting for university students. Lines has also highlighted the under-representation of women in senior levels of academia.

== Court cases and pending criminal charges ==
Lines served as a witness in the attempted murder trial of her ex-partner, Jonathon Hawtin (R v Hawtin in the Supreme Court of South Australia). The trial followed an incident in October 2017, in which Hawtin allegedly attempted to murder Zacharia Josef Bruckner, with both being severely injured. Hawtin was acquitted by a jury in September 2019.

On 15 November 2023, South Australia Police (SAPOL) released a statement advising that a 43-year-old woman, who was later confirmed to be Lines, was arrested by local Police in Palau on behalf of SAPOL Major Crime Investigation Branch to face charges in South Australia of two counts of attempted murder and two counts of conspiracy to murder involving the October 2017 incident in which Hawtin was rendered a quadriplegic. A 36-year-old Brisbane man was also arrested in Brisbane to appear in the Brisbane Magistrates Court on 16 November 2023 in relation to conspiracy to murder-related offences. This man was later named as Zacharia Josef Bruckner. On 24 November 2023 Lines was extradited from Palau to South Australia on charges that she conspired to murder her former husband and his mother.

Lines is charged along with Bruckner, who received a gunshot wound to his stomach in the incident at the Littlehampton home. She appeared in the Supreme Court of South Australia on 23 December 2025, where she applied for home detention bail on grounds of hardship to her children as well as her own complicated health issues. It was opposed by the prosecution and will return to court in January 2026.

== Publications ==
=== Books ===
- Milicianas: Women in Combat in the Spanish Civil War (1936–1939) (Lexington Press, 2011). ISBN 9780739164921

=== Chapters ===
- 'Representativeness and Positive Discrimination' in Deane-Peter Baker (ed.), Key Concepts in Military Ethics (UNSW Press, 2015), pp. 56–59. ISBN 9781742234380

=== Journal articles ===
- 'General Francisco Franco's Capabilities as a Military Leader during the Spanish Civil War: The Need for a Re-evaluation', Journal of Military History, vol. 81, no. 2, pp. 513–534.
- 'Female Combatants in the Spanish Civil War: Milicianas on the Front Lines and in the Rearguard', Journal of International Women's Studies, vol. 10, no. 4, pp. 168–187.
- 'Representations of the Spanish Civil War in Twenty-First Century Anglophone Novels (2000–14)', Journal of War & Culture Studies, vol. 10, no. 2, pp. 150–164.
- 'Ghostwriters guaranteeing grades? The quality of online ghostwriting services available to tertiary students in Australia', Teaching in Higher Education, vol. 21, no. 8, pp. 513–534.
- 'Substantive Editing as a Form of Plagiarism among Postgraduate Students in Australia', Assessment & Evaluation in Higher Education, vol. 41, no. 3, pp. 368–383.
- 'Prostitution in Thailand: Representations in Fiction and Narrative Non-Fiction', Journal of International Women’s Studies, vol. 16, no. 3, pp. 86–100.
