= Mohamed Saïl =

Algerian anarchist (1894–1953)

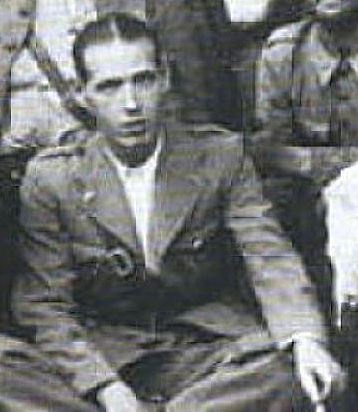
- Saïl in Spain, 1936
- Born: Mohand Amezian ben Ameziane Saïl (Note: "Mohand" is an Amazigh variant of "Mohamed"); 14 October 1894; Taourirt, Kabylia, French Algeria
- Died: 27 April 1953 (aged 58); Bobigny, Île-de-France, France
- Resting place: Bobigny cemetery
- Citizenship: Native
- Occupations: Mechanic, writer
- Years active: 1910–1953
- Organisations: Anarchist Union (1920–1939); Revolutionary Syndicalist General Confederation of Labour (1929–1939); Anarchist Federation (1945–1953)
- Movement: Anarchism, Algerian independence
- Opponent: French colonial empire
- Military career
- Allegiance: Spanish Republic (1936); Free France (1940–1944)
- Service: Confederal militias (1936); French Resistance (1940–1944)
- Service years: 1936; 1940–1944
- Unit: Durruti Column (1936)
- Commands: Sébastien Faure Century (1936)
- Conflicts: Spanish Civil War; World War II

Mohand Amezian ben Ameziane Saïl (14 October 1894 – 27 April 1953) was an Algerian anarchist and anti-colonial activist. Born in Kabylia, he was largely self-taught and became an atheist and an anarchist after moving to Metropolitan France. After World War I, he joined the French anarchist movement and began agitating for Algerian independence. He was arrested and imprisoned several times during the 1930s, due to his anti-colonialist, anti-militarist and anti-fascist activism. He volunteered to fight in the Spanish Civil War and served in the Durruti Column until he was wounded and forced to return to France. After the Nazi occupation of France, he was interned in a concentration camp, but escaped and joined the French Resistance. With the liberation of France, he resumed his agitation for Algerian independence, calling for a social revolution to overthrow the French colonial empire. In his writings, he depicted native Kabyles as having their own libertarian and egalitarian tradition, and proposed the establishment of a non-hierarchical and secular society in an independent Algeria. He continued his activism up until his death, one year before the Algerian War of Independence broke out.

== Biography ==
=== Early life ===
Mohand Amezian ben Ameziane Saïl was born on 14 October 1894 in Taourirt, a small Amazigh village in the mountains of Kabylia, in the east of French Algeria. Raised Muslim, he later became an atheist. He was largely self-educated and worked as a mechanic. At a young age, he moved to Metropolitan France, where he joined the French anarchist movement around 1910. Following the French entry into World War I, he was conscripted into the French Colonial Army and later imprisoned on charges of desertion and insubordination. After the war, he moved to Paris, where he joined the Anarchist Union (UA).

=== Anti-colonial activism ===
In the early 1920s, Saïl began agitating against the French colonial empire and organised groups to defend the rights of Algerians in France. In 1923, he established the Indigenous Algerian Defense Committee, within which he agitated against French colonialism alongside Sliman Kiouane. In the 17th arrondissement of Paris, Saïl held anti-colonial meetings in the Arabic and French languages, and in the neighbourhood of Aulnay-sous-Bois, he established an anarchist group. Drawing from the philosophy of insurrectionary anarchism, in his 1924 article "Le calvaire des indigènes algériens", he predicted that Algerians would soon take up arms against French colonialism.

In 1929, he joined the Revolutionary Syndicalist General Confederation of Labour (CGT-SR), within which he organised a separate Algerian section. The following year, he organised an Algerian Defense Committee to oppose celebrations of the centenary of the French conquest of Algeria. He brought together all French anarchist organisations to sign a joint statement denouncing the colonial occupation. Saïl's statement described French colonialism as "banditry" and demanded the extension of civil liberties, including freedom of association and freedom of the press, to Algeria.

Throughout the 1930s, Saïl was arrested and imprisoned on multiple occasions over his radical activism; each time he was released, he immediately returned to agitation and organisation. In 1932, he was prosecuted for publishing anti-militarist articles in his magazine L'Eveil Social (English: The Social Awakening). He received support from International Red Aid, but rejected it due to his anti-Stalinism. In response, he denounced the poor treatment of inmates in the Solovki prison camp, described Stalinism as "red fascism", and called for prisoner support to be extended to Soviet prisoners. Following the 6 February 1934 crisis, during which far-right groups rioted outside the National Assembly, he began collecting weapons in preparation for a potential fascist coup. He proclaimed that the watchwords of anti-fascism ought to be "an eye for an eye". He was arrested on 3 March, charged with illegal possession of weapons and imprisoned for four months; during his trial, the French Communist Party accused him of being an agent provocateur.

Later that year, he began publishing a North African edition of the anarchist magazine Terre Libre (English: Free Land), in collaboration with André Prudhommeaux. Saïl also established the Anarchist Group of Indigenous Algerians, which campaigned against clericalism and colonialism, and called for equal rights for Algerians.

=== War and after ===
In 1936, Saïl volunteered to fight in the Spanish Civil War, joining up with the International Group of the Durruti Column. He became commander of the Sébastien Faure Century, the Column's French-speaking section. In November 1936, he was wounded while fighting on the Aragon front, near Zaragoza, and hospitalised in Barcelona. His wound left him disabled and forced him to change professions from mechanics to pottery repair. In December 1936, he returned to France, where he rallied French anarchist support for the Spanish Republic in its war against the Nationalists. He also gave lectures on the collectivisations that took place during the Spanish Revolution. He and Louis Berthomieux would later be accused of desertion by the Spanish Republican Army. Saïl resumed his anti-colonial activism, protesting against the French government's repression of Messali Hadj's North African Star. In December 1938, Saïl was arrested again for anti-militarist provocations and sentenced to 18 months imprisonment.

Following the Nazi occupation of France, Saïl was captured and interned in a concentration camp in Riom. He managed to escape and join up with the French Resistance, within which he forged fake passports to help Algerians escape the country. After the Liberation of France, he joined the newly-established Anarchist Federation (FA) and returned to anti-colonial agitation against the French empire. He attempted to re-establish his Algerian anarchist group and wrote a series of anti-colonial articles for the FA's magazine Le Libertaire (English: The Libertarian). In the articles he wrote during the late 1940s, Sail began to appeal for Algerians to rise up in a social revolution against French colonialism. He also warned Algerians against the rising influence of Stalinism in the Arab world.

Towards the end of his life, he was a part of the platformist Organisation Thought Battle. He remained active in the French anarchist movement until his death. On 27 April 1953, Saïl died from cancer. French anarcho-communist Georges Fontenis gave the eulogy at his funeral on 30 April 1953.

== Political thought ==
Saïl developed a version of anarchism and anti-authoritarianism for the Algerian context, rejecting the Eurocentric approach to anarchism. Saïl believed that his own people, the Kabyles, already practiced forms of autonomy, decentralisation and mutual aid without calling them anarchism. He depicted Kabyles as "fundamentally libertarians", who rejected militarism, practiced free trade and emphasised solidarity such as the right to asylum; he said they were instinctively drawn towards liberation, in spite of the political repression by French colonial authorities. He argued that these libertarian and egalitarian traditions would move Algerian society towards a social revolution and independence. He also believed that indigenous Algerians were natural allies of the French working-class, as they both had a shared enemy in the French state, and called for working-class unity in support of Algerian independence.

He believed that the independence of Algeria ought to involve the creation of a non-hierarchical and secular system. He criticised Algerian nationalists for what he perceived as opportunism, declaring that Algerians would continue to resist any new ruling class that took power from the French colonisers. He also denounced the clericalism of the Marabouts; as an atheist, Saïl was suspicious of Islamism and considered Algerian culture to be inherently non-religious.

== Legacy ==
After Saïl's death, the Algerian War of Independence broke out in 1954; the North African Libertarian Movement (MLNA) joined the fight for independence, but was repressed by 1957. The struggle for Kabyle self-determination continued after the independence of Algeria in 1962, with the anti-authoritarian Berber Spring breaking out in 1980. But the Algerian anarchist movement waned, with no specifically anarchist organisations forming in the country, although individual Algerians identified themselves as anarchists.

Mohamed Saïl was largely forgotten in the latter half of the 20th century, only receiving passing mentions in works about the history of the interwar French anarchist movement. By the turn of the 21st century, interest in Saïl's life and philosophy had begun to grow, with his work gaining a wider audience than he had during his life. However, no full biography or analysis of his influence on the Algerian independence movement has yet been written. In 1994, the Anarchist Federation published a book of Saïl's collected works. In 2009, one of Saïl's articles, "The Kabyle Mindset", was translated into English by Paul Sharkey and published by Robert Graham in the second volume of Anarchism: A Documentary History of Libertarian Ideas.

== Selected works ==
Articles

- "Le calvaire des indigènes algériens" ["The ordeal of the Algerian natives"] (Le Libertaire, 16 August 1924)
- "L'idéal du Parti communiste" ["The ideal of the Communist Party"] (Le Libertaire, 24 November 1924)
- "Le centenaire de la conquête de l'Algérie" ["The centenary of the conquest of Algeria"] (La voix libertaire, 21 September 1929)
- "A l'opinion publique" ["To public opinion"] (La voix libertaire, 15 March 1930)
- "Peuple algérien, debout!" ["Algerian people, stand up!"] (La voix libertaire, February 1932)
- "Réponse au Secours rouge" ["Response to Red Aid"] (L'Éveil social, February 1933)
- "Le cynisme des administrateurs" ["The cynicism of administrators"] (L'Éveil social, August 1933)
- "Un appel du groupe anarchiste aux indigènes algériens" ["An appeal from an anarchist group to the Algerian natives"] (La voix libertaire, 23 March 1935)
- "La "civilisation française" en Algérie" ["The "French Civilisation" in Algeria"] (Terre Libre, 20 December 1935)
- "A bas le code de l'indigénat! Egalité totale des droits!" ["Down with the Native Code! Total equality of rights!"] (Le Libertaire, 24 July 1936)
- "Letrre du front" ["Letter from the front"] (L'Espagne antifasciste, 4 November 1936)
- "Réponse a Terre Libre" (Terre Libre, 25 February 1938)
- "Aux travailleurs algériens" ["To Algerian workers"] (Le Libertaire, 25 March 1946)
- "La mentalité kabyle" ["The Kabyle Mindset"] (Le Libertaire, 16 February 1951)
- "Valets du bourreau" ["Servants of the executioners"] (Le Libertaire, 5 October 1951)

Columns

- "Le calvaire des travailleurs nord-africains" ["The ordeal of the North African workers"] (Le Libertaire, 15 June 1951)
- "Le calvaire des travailleurs nord-africains" (Le Libertaire, 29 June 1951)
- "Le calvaire des travailleurs nord-africains" (Le Libertaire, 6 July 1951)
- "Le calvaire des travailleurs nord-africains" (Le Libertaire, 26 July 1951)
- "Le calvaire des travailleurs nord-africains" (Le Libertaire, 17 August 1951)

Collected works (posthumous)

- Appels aux travailleurs algériens [Appeal to Algerian workers] (Anarchist Federation, 1994) OCLC 466607851
- L'étrange étranger: Écrits d'un anarchiste kabyle [The Strange Stranger: Writings of a Kabyle Anarchist] (Lux, 2020) ISBN 9782895969884

== Bibliography ==
- Berry, David (2016). "Anarchists and anarchisms in France since 1945: introduction and sources". Modern & Contemporary France. 24 (2): 115–126. doi:10.1080/09639489.2016.1154307. ISSN 1469-9869.
- Boulouque, Sylvain (1994). "Saïl Mohamed: Ou la vie et la Révolte d'un anarchiste Algérien". Appels aux travailleurs algériens. Volonté Anarchiste (in French). Vol. 43. Groupe Fresnes-Antony. pp. 1–4. OCLC 466607851.
- Boulouque, Sylvain (2 March 2021). "Mohamed Saïl (1894-1953)". Partage Noir (in French).
- Brodie, Morris (2020). "Volunteers for Anarchy: The International Group of the Durruti Column in the Spanish Civil War". Journal of Contemporary History. 56 (1): 28–54. doi:10.1177/0022009420949926. ISSN 0022-0094.
- Galián, Laura (25 July 2020). Colonialism, Transnationalism, and Anarchism in the South of the Mediterranean. Palgrave Macmillan. ISBN 978-3-030-45448-7.
- Graham, Robert (2009). "Mohamed Saïl: The Kabyle Mind-Set (1951)". Anarchism: A Documentary History of Libertarian Ideas. Vol. 2. Black Rose Books. pp. 157–160. ISBN 978-1-55164-311-3.
- Laursen, Ole Birk (2019). "Anti-imperialism". The Palgrave Handbook of Anarchism. Palgrave Macmillan. pp. 149–167. doi:10.1007/978-3-319-75620-2_8. ISBN 978-3-319-75619-6.
- Mugnai, Bruno (2019). Foreign volunteers and International Brigades in the Spanish civil war (1936-39). Soldiershop. ISBN 9788893274524.
- Porter, David (2011). Eyes to the South: French Anarchists & Algeria. AK Press. ISBN 978-1-84935-076-1.
- Porter, David (2020). "André Prudhommeaux, Algeria and National Liberation". Anarchist Studies. 29 (1): 39–56. ISSN 0967-3393.
- Ramnath, Maia (2019). "Non-Western Anarchisms and Postcolonialism". In Adams, Matthew S.; Levy, Carl (eds.). The Palgrave Handbook of Anarchism. London: Palgrave Macmillan. pp. 677–695. doi:10.1007/978-3-319-75620-2_38. ISBN 978-3319756196. S2CID 150357033.
- van der Walt, Lucien; Schmidt, Michael (2009). Black Flame: The Revolutionary Class Politics of Anarchism and Syndicalism. AK Press. ISBN 978-1-904859-16-1.
