= Émile Cottin =

French anarchist (1896–1936)

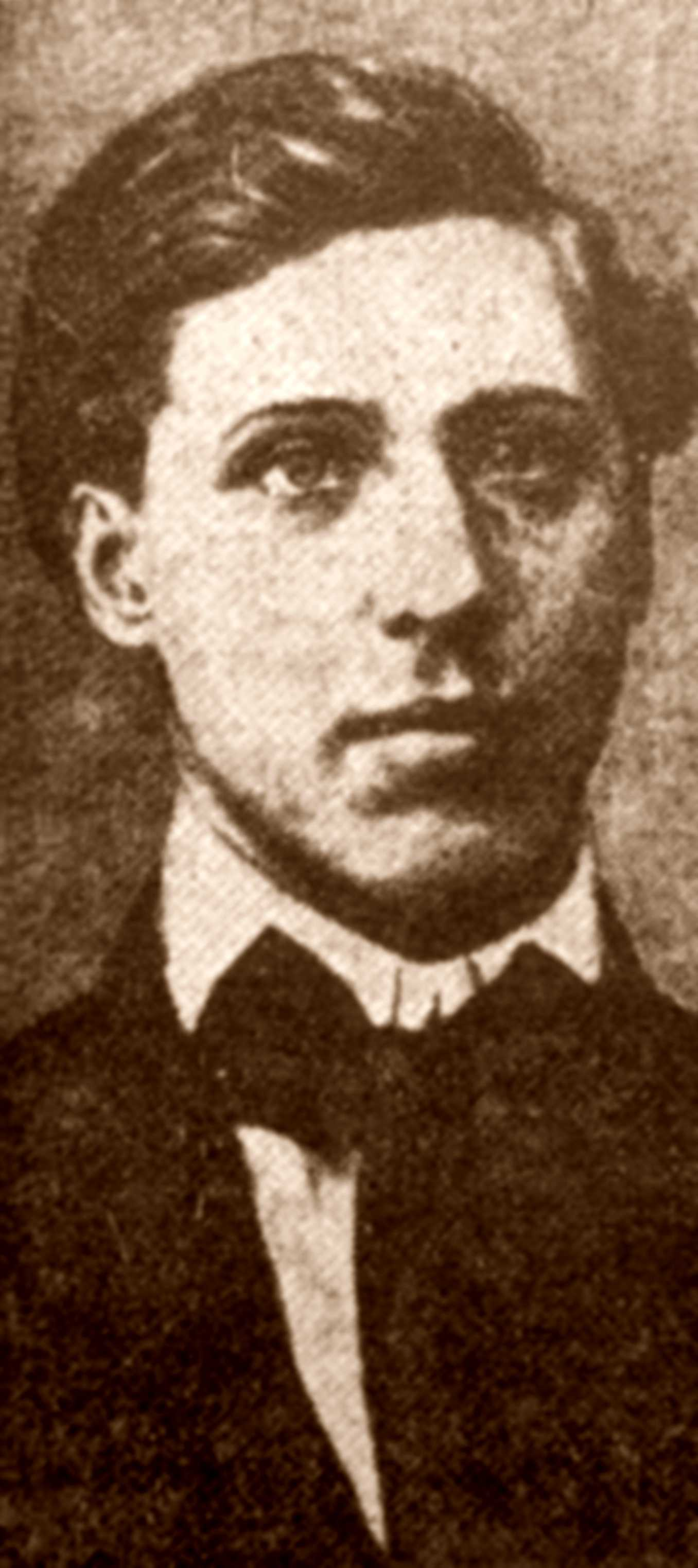
- Born: 14 March 1896; Creil, France
- Died: 8 October 1936 (aged 40); Farlete, Spain
- Cause of death: Killed in action
- Occupations: Cabinet maker, Anarchist
- Known for: Attempted assassination of Georges Clemenceau

Louis Émile Cottin (14 March 1896 – 8 October 1936, nicknamed "Milou") was a French militant anarchist who is best known for the attempted assassination of Georges Clemenceau.

== Early life ==
Cottin was born to a working-class family in Creil, France on 14 March 1896, and raised in Compiègne. He found vocation as a cabinet-maker.

As a young man he became interested in anarchism, and in 1915 he met French anarchists Émile Armand, Pierre Chardon, Sébastien Faure, Louis Lecoin and the Spanish anarchist Buenaventura Durruti, with whom he would remain close friends throughout his life.

In May 1918, he witnessed municipal guards open fire on striking workers at an aviation factory, which he saw as an affront to his anarchist principles. At anarchist gatherings Prime Minister Georges Clemenceau was frequently blamed for breaking the strike, and Cottin decided to kill him.

== Assassination attempt ==
On 19 February 1919, Cottin fired on then Prime Minister of France Georges Clemenceau several times as he was leaving his house on rue Franklin in Paris to attend a meeting with Edward M. House and Arthur Balfour at the Hôtel de Crillon. He hit Clemenceau once, but the bullet missed his vital organs, and the Prime Minister survived. The bullet proved too close to his heart to admit surgery, however, and it remained in Clemenceau's body until he died from unrelated causes in 1929.

Cottin was seized by the crowd following Clemenceau's procession and nearly lynched.

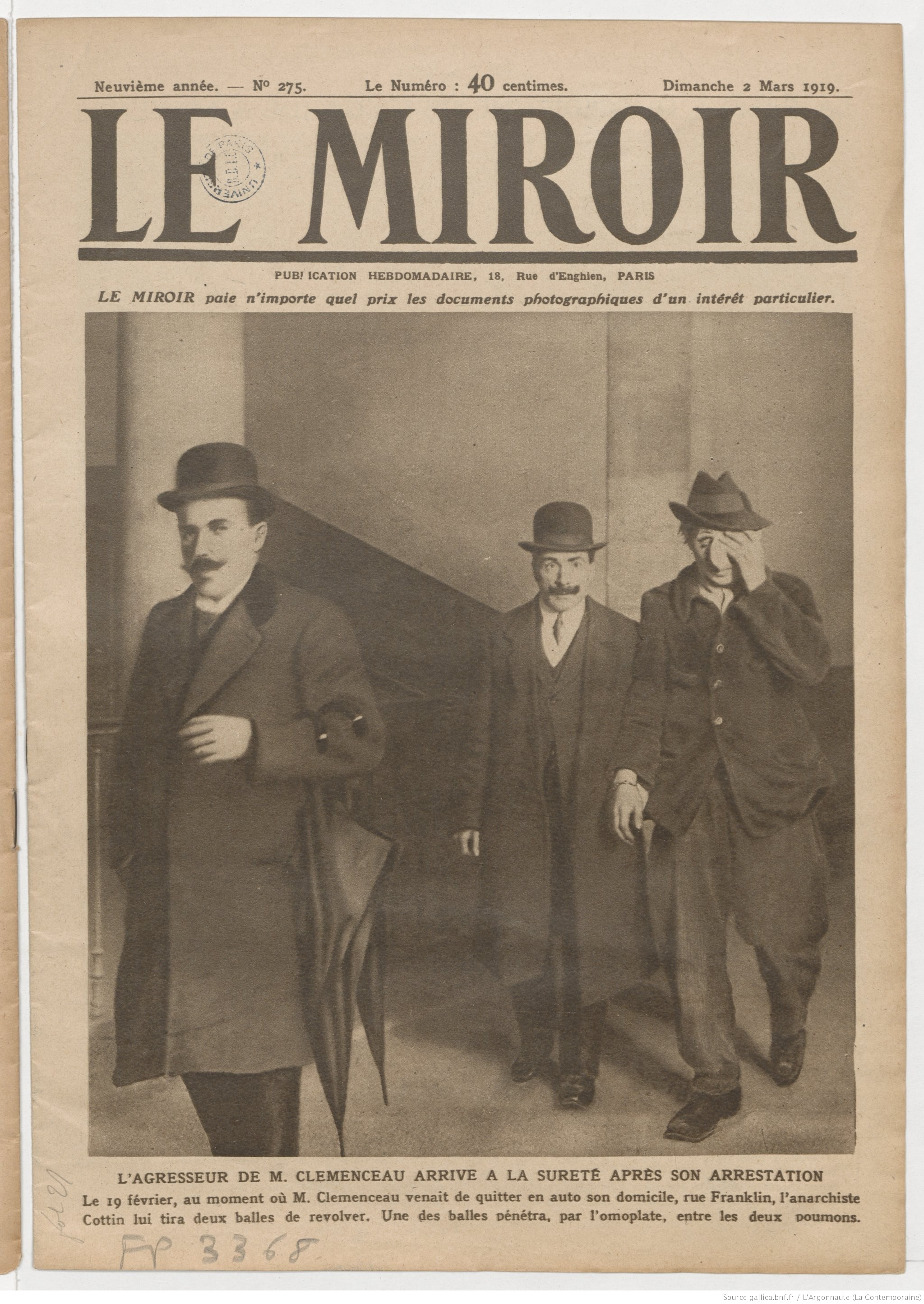
The cover of Le Miroir on 2 March 1919 Cottin under arrest

Clemenceau often joked about Cottin's bad marksmanship – "We have just won the most terrible war in history, yet here is a Frenchman who misses his target 6 out of 7 times at point-blank range. Of course this fellow must be punished for the careless use of a dangerous weapon and for poor marksmanship. I suggest that he be locked up for eight years, with intensive training in a shooting gallery."

While Cottin was initially condemned to death, his sentence was commuted to ten years imprisonment after a campaign by French anarchist newspaper Le Libertaire, who noted that the successful assassin of Socialist leader Jean Jaurès had not received the death sentence, while Cottin, who had failed, had.

At his trial he declared himself a Bolshevik, and later published a declaration entitled Why I Shot Clemenceau. He explained that his motivation for killing Clemenceau had been the latter's unwillingness to allow Russian soldiers to return to their homeland after the revolution, instead sending them to Africa or even forcing them to fight against the Russian communists.

In the United States, authorities interpreted the assassination attempt as a part of a broader international conspiracy on the part of anarchists to assassinate world leaders, and raided the homes of several Spanish anarchists, arresting fourteen on charges of conspiracy to assassinate President Woodrow Wilson.

== Later life and death ==
Following his release from prison, Cottin remained under house arrest for some time at both his parents' home and his children's. In 1936 he joined the Durruti Column, the largest anarchist column formed during the Spanish Civil War, and fell in battle at Farlete, near Pina de Ebro in the Province of Zaragoza, in Aragon, Spain.
