= Malek Chebel =

Algerian writer and anthropologist

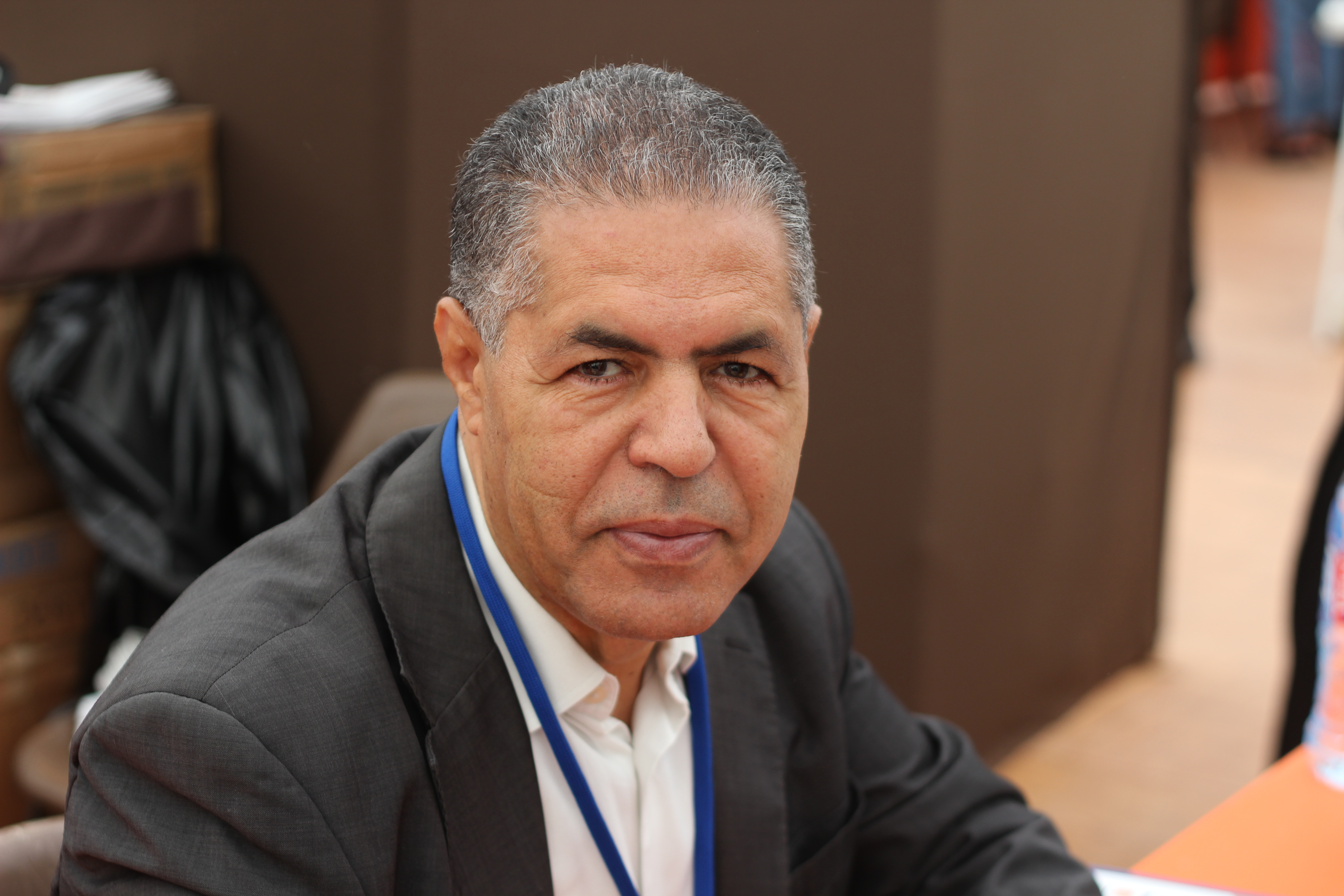
- Malek Chebel in 2014
- Born: 12 April 1953; Skikda, Algeria
- Died: 12 November 2016 (aged 63); Paris, France
- Education: Sciences Po
- Occupation: Philosopher

Malek Chebel (1953 – 12 November 2016) was a notable Algerian philosopher and anthropologist of religions . He was one of the most prominent North African intellectuals. He studied in Algeria, then later in France at Paris where he also studied psychoanalysis. He was a teacher at many universities worldwide.

Essayist, author of books specialized in Arab world and Islam, he created the expression: “Islam of lights”. He spoke at numerous conferences in Europe and Africa.

He is known for his reflections about Islam, its culture, its history, intellectual life. He is also famous for his public positions for a liberal Islam, and for its reform. His famous works include 'The Manifesto for an Enlightened Islam'.

== Biography ==
Born in 1953 at Philippeville, now Skikda in Algeria, Chebel pursued his primary and secondary studies there and obtained his baccalaureate in philosophy and Arab letters. He entered the university of Ain El Bay (Constantine) in 1977, then he went to France to pursue his university studies. In 1980, he obtained a first degree in clinical psychopathology and psychoanalysis from Paris 7 University.

Then, in 1982, Chebel obtained his doctorate of anthropology, ethnology and science of religions at Jussieu, and in 1984, he earned a doctorate in political science at the Paris Institute of Political Studies. He worked at the research direction at the Sorbonne. He worked and gave conferences in Europe, in the Arab world and in America.

== His thoughts ==
The work of Malek Chebel with his vast experience as a historian, psychoanalyst and anthropologist is mainly devoted do to the defense of freedom in its all forms: political freedom, freedom of thought, freedom to live, love, its place in Islam and Muslim culture. Freedom guides his reflection about the body, desire, love, relations between men and women, but also about tolerance, politic engagement, and generosity. He called for the end of violence (in all its forms).

He prefaced several books including the translation of Quran made by Edouard Montet. He died of cancer on 12 November 2016.

== Islam and Occident ==
His work Islam and Free Will aims to understand Islam and its relation with the Occident. Understanding the ways of thinking, of living, the sensibilities of the other to go beyond hatred, giving him a place in this world. It is also an interrogation about the place of freedom in Islam, and an invitation for new research on Islam and its traditions. He called for a return to the original tenets of Islam to combat fundamental Islamism. “The majority of Muslims are caught between two groups: on the one hand a small group of violent Muslims who want to Islamize the world; and on the other hand the majority of the Western people who don’t understand Islam”.

He reminds us that Islam is plural and alive. He also reminds us that in the past, Islam has been innovative in a lot of aspects of life. He analyzed the evolution and mutations of mentalities in the Muslim world. Chebel affirmed that through the centuries, there were great periods of peace, creativity and happiness along with periods of brutal violence. He states, “It is in the name of these centuries that I work; in the name of many scientists, writers, grammarians, jurists, doctors that I speak."

== Works ==
- 1984 : Le corps en Islam, Éd. PUF, coll. Quadrige 2^{e} éd. 1999, 3^{e}éd. 2004
- 1986 : La formation de l'identité politique, Éd. PUF, Éd. Payot 2^{e}éd. 1997
- 1986 : Le livre des séductions suivi de Dix Aphorismes sur l'amour, Lieu commun, Éd. Payot 2^{e}éd. 1997
- 1988 : L'Esprit de sérail, mythes et pratiques sexuelles au Maghreb, Lieu commun, Éd. Payot 2^{e}éd. 1997
- 1992 : Histoire de la circoncision des origines à nos jours, Éd. Balland, 2^{e}éd. 1997, Éd. Perrin 3^{e}éd. 2006
- 1993 : L'imaginaire arabo-musulman, Éd. PUF, 2^{e} éd. coll. Quadrige 2002
- 1995 : Dictionnaire des symboles musulmans, Éd. Albin Michel, 2^{e} éd. 2001
- 1995 : Encyclopédie de l'amour en Islam. Érotisme, beauté et sexualité dans le monde arabe, en Perse et en Turquie, Éd. Payot, 2^{e}éd. 2003
- 1996 : Psychanalyse des Mille et Une Nuits, Éd. Payot, 2^{e}éd. 2002
- 1997 : Les symboles de l'Islam, album, Éd. Assouline, 2^{e} éd. 1999
- 1998 : Préface de Coran, Traduit par Edouard Montet, Éd. Payot-Poche, 2^{e}éd. 2001
- 1999 : Traité du raffinement, Éd. Payot, 2^{e}éd. en poche 2008
- 2000 : Du Désir, Éd. Payot, 2^{e}éd. 2002
- 2001 : Les cent noms de l'amour, avec Lassad Metoui, Éd. Alternatives, 2^{e} éd. 2003
- 2002 : Mahomet et l'Islam, Illustré par Yves Beaujard, Casterman
- 2002 : Le Sujet en Islam, Éd. du Seuil
- 2003 : Islam et Libre arbitre, la tentation de l'insolence, avec Marie de Solemne, Éd. Dervy
- 2004 : Dictionnaire amoureux de l'islam, Éd. Plon, coll. « Dictionnaire amoureux »
- 2004 : Manifeste pour un islam des lumières. 27 propositions pour réformer l'islam, Éd. Hachette Littératures
- 2004 : Anthologie du vin et de l'ivresse, Éd. du Seuil, 2^{e}éd. Pauvert 2008
- 2005 : Préface de L'islam, passion française. Une anthologie, Bartillat
- 2005 : L'islam et la raison, le combat des idées, Perrin, 2^{e}éd. Tempus 2006
- 2006 : Le Kama sutra arabe, 2000 ans de littérature érotique en Orient, Pauvert
- 2006 : Le Coran raconté aux enfants, Illustré par Mimi des Bois, Petit Phare
- 2007 : L'Islam expliqué, Perrin
- 2007 : Treize contes du Coran et de l'Islam, Fayard
- 2007 : L'esclavage en terre d'islam Fayard
- 2007 : Ouvrage collectif Prières d'Islam. Ce que les hommes disent aux Dieux, Éd. du Seuil, p. 209-272
- 2008 : Le Coran pour les Nuls, avec Sohaib Sultan, Éd. Broché
- 2008 : L'Islam pour les Nuls, avec Malcolm Clark, Éd. Broché
- 2008 : Anthologie du vin et de l'ivresse en Islam, Pauvert
- 2009 : Sagesses d'Islam, Éd. First
- 2009 : Coran (nouvelle traduction), Fayard
- 2009 : Dictionnaire encyclopédique du Coran, Fayard
- 2011 : Les grandes figures de l'Islam, Librairie Académique Perrin
- 2011 : Les Enfants d'Abraham. Un chrétien, un juif et un musulman dialoguent, avec Alain de La Morandais, Haïm Korsia, Presses de la Renaissance
- 2012 : Dictionnaire amoureux de l'Algérie, Plon
- 2014 : L’érotisme arabe, Bouquins
- 2015 : L'inconscient de l'islam : Réflexions sur l'interdit, la faute et la transgression, CNRS, ISBN 978-2271085863
