= Algerian National Movement =

Algerian National Movement الحركة الوطنية الجزائرية
- Abbreviation: MNA
- Leader: Messali Hadj
- Founded: 1 November 1954
- Dissolved: 1962
- Preceded by: Movement for the Triumph of Democratic Liberties
- Ideology: Algerian nationalism
- Political position: Left-wing

The Algerian National Movement (MNA; Arabic: الحركة الوطنية الجزائرية) was a political party and movement founded by Messali Hadj in November 1, 1954 to counteract the efforts of the National Liberation Front (FLN) during the Algerian War.

== History ==
Following the dissolution of the Movement for the Triumph of Democratic Liberties by French authorities on November 5, 1954, veteran nationalist Messali Hadj founded the Algerian National Movement as a rival to the National Liberation Front (FLN) during the Algerian War of Independence. Messali Hadj was a co-founder and President of the three earlier organizations leading the movement for independence beginning in 1926. The MNA condemned the armed insurrection of November 1, 1954 that was led by the FLN. The armed wing of the FLN, the National Liberation Army (ALN), succeeded in destroying the MNA's small armed groups in Algeria early on in the war. The MNA and FLN also fought each other on French soil in the so-called Café Wars, resulting in hundreds of casualties, but FLN gradually gained the upper hand. The confrontations between the MNA and FLN from 1954 to 1962 directly or indirectly killed 4,000 people and injured 12,000. The National Liberation Front (FLN) managed to prove that it was the movement that led the underground resistance fighters, while the Algerian National Movement (MNA) lost all popular support in Algeria, although remaining active in Metropolitan France. Control over post-independence Algeria would rest firmly in the hands of the FLN and its military, while the MNA vanished as a political organization.
