= Bayeu =

Bayeu is a surname. Notable people with the surname include:

- Francisco Bayeu y Subias (1734–1795), Spanish painter
- Josefa Bayeu (1747–1812), sister of Francisco Bayeu and wife of artist Francisco Goya
- Ramón Bayeu (1746–1793), Spanish Neoclassicist painter, brother of Francisco
