= Church of Nuestra Señora de la Asunción (Valdemoro) =

Church in Community of Madrid, Spain

Church of Señora de la Asunción
- Iglesia de Nuestra Señora de la Asunción (Spanish)
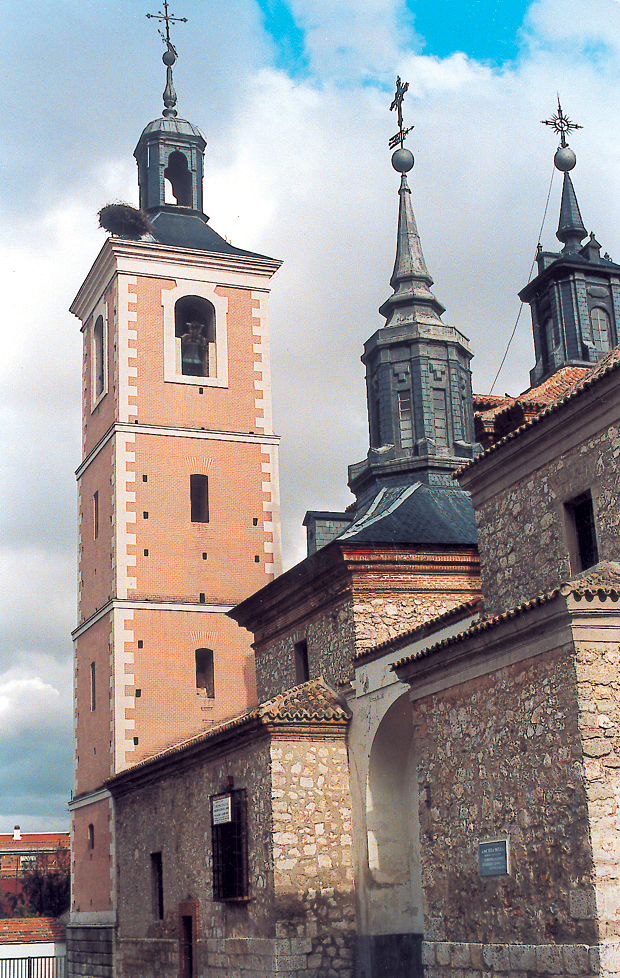

- Location within Spain
- 40.188753°N 3.678983°W
- Location: Valdemoro, Spain

History
- Built: 1764

Site notes
- Architectural style: Baroque

Spanish Cultural Heritage
- Official name: Iglesia de Nuestra Señora de la Asunción
- Type: Non-movable
- Criteria: Monument
- Designated: 1981
- Reference no.: RI-51-0004445

The Church of Nuestra Señora de la Asunción (Spanish: Iglesia de Nuestra Señora de la Asunción) is a church located in Valdemoro, Spain. It was declared Bien de Interés Cultural in 1981.

Built in Baroque style, it has a nave measuring 60 x 28 meters, with side chapels. The high altar is decorated by the paintings St. Peter of Verona by Ramón Bayeu, The Assumption of the Virgin by Francisco Bayeu, and the Apparition of the Virgin to St. Julian by Francisco Goya. The bell tower was completed in 1764.
