= San Juan el Real, Calatayud =

Church in Zaragoza, Spain

Coordinates: 41°21′09″N 1°38′37″W

San Juan el Real, in translation, St John the Royal is a Baroque-style, Roman Catholic church located in Calatayud, region of Aragon, Spain.

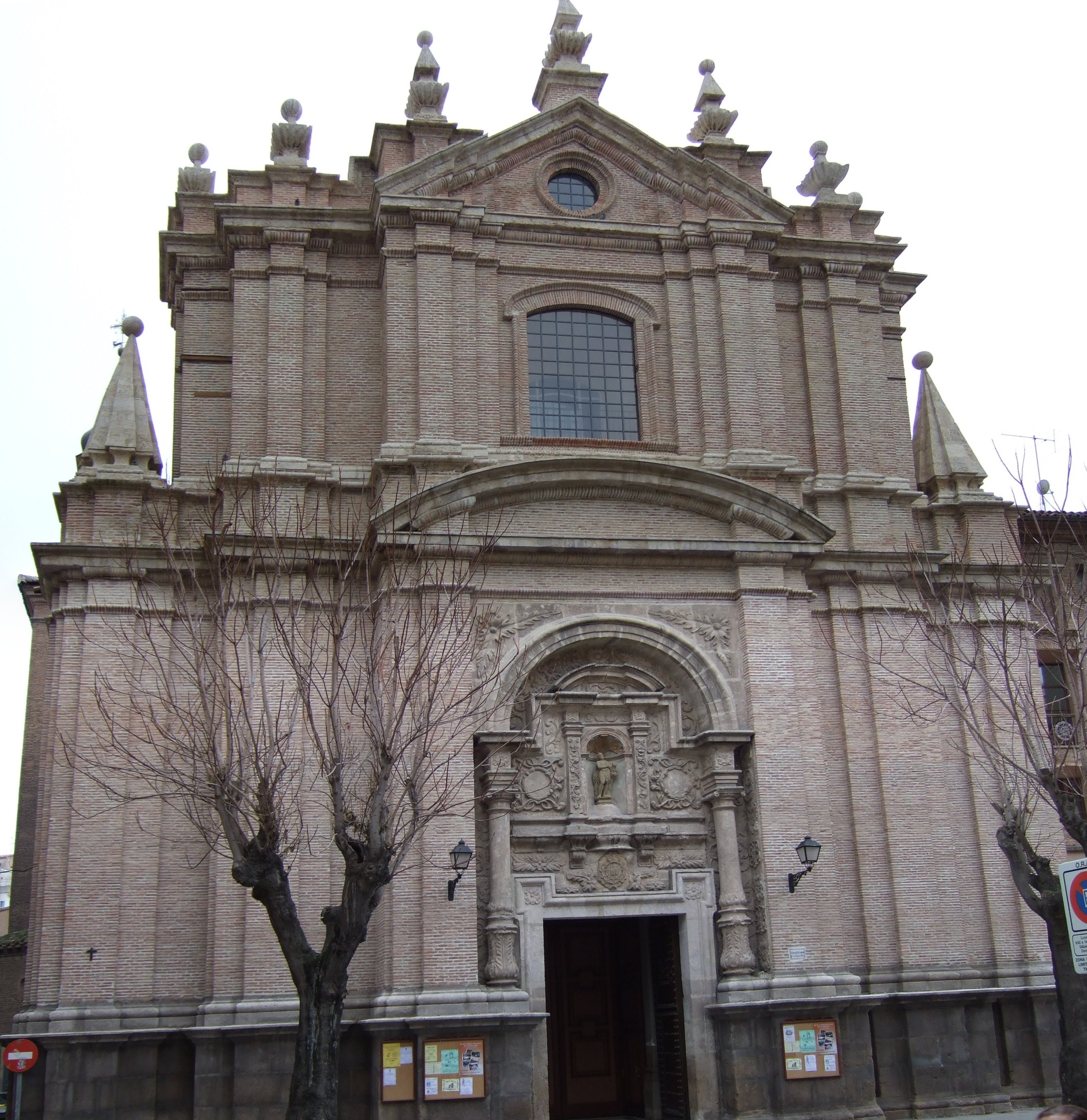
Facade

== History ==
The church was commissioned by the Jesuit order, and dedicated to the Virgen del Pilar. However, in 1769, after the expulsion of the Jesuits from Spain, the parishioners converted this into a parish church to replace the ruined 12th-century San Juan de Vallupié church. They changed the dedication to San Juan el Real.

== Art and Architecture ==
The brick facade is sober and surmounted with slender pyramidal pinnacles. The layout is of a Latin cross, with interior stucco decoration.

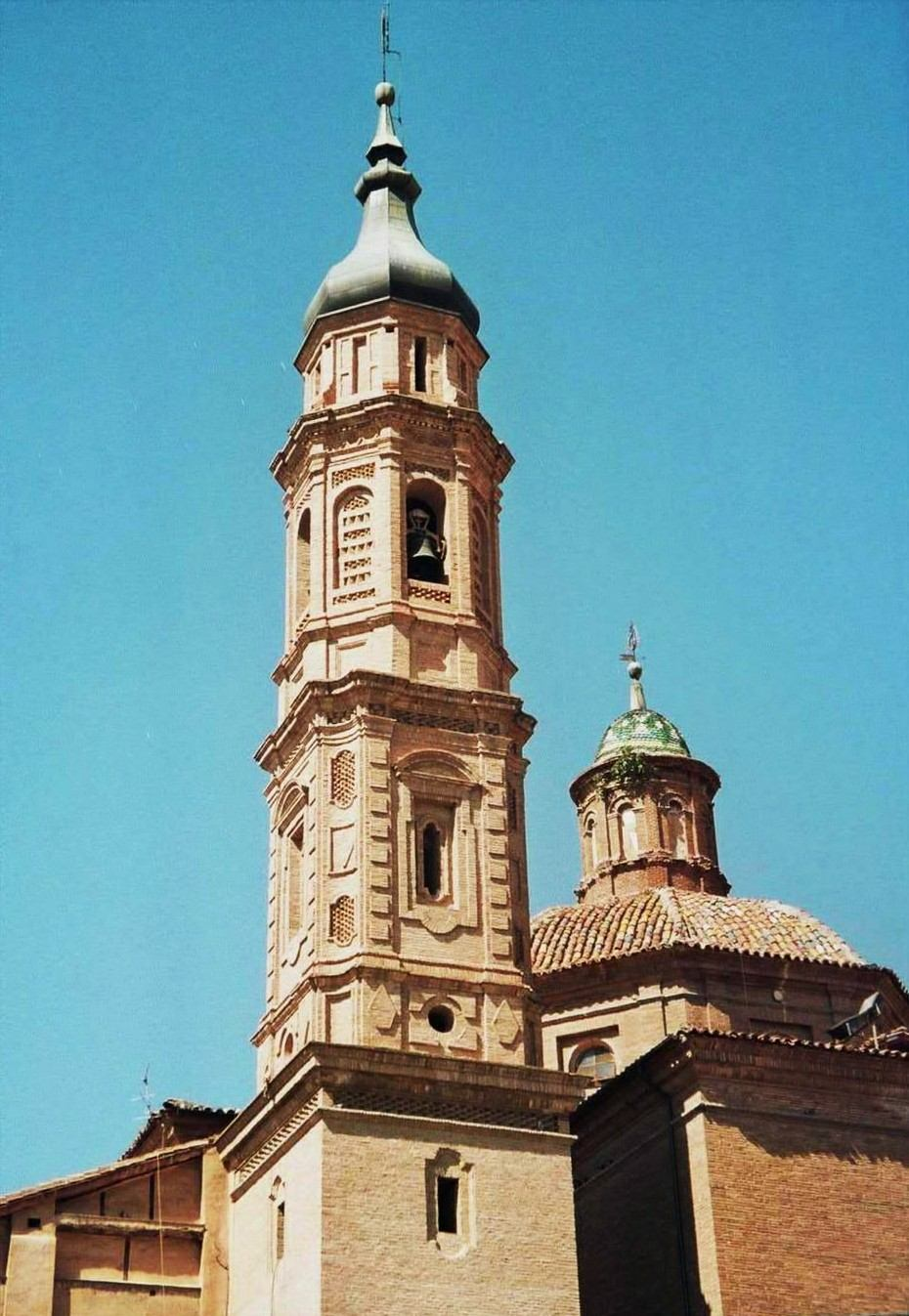
Mudéjar style bell tower

The mudéjar-style tower was not built until 1774 - 1777; the architectural style, while atavistic matched other towers in the city and was pursued by the designs of Mosén José Jimeno of Ateca. As typical for that style, the degree of decoration increases with the height.

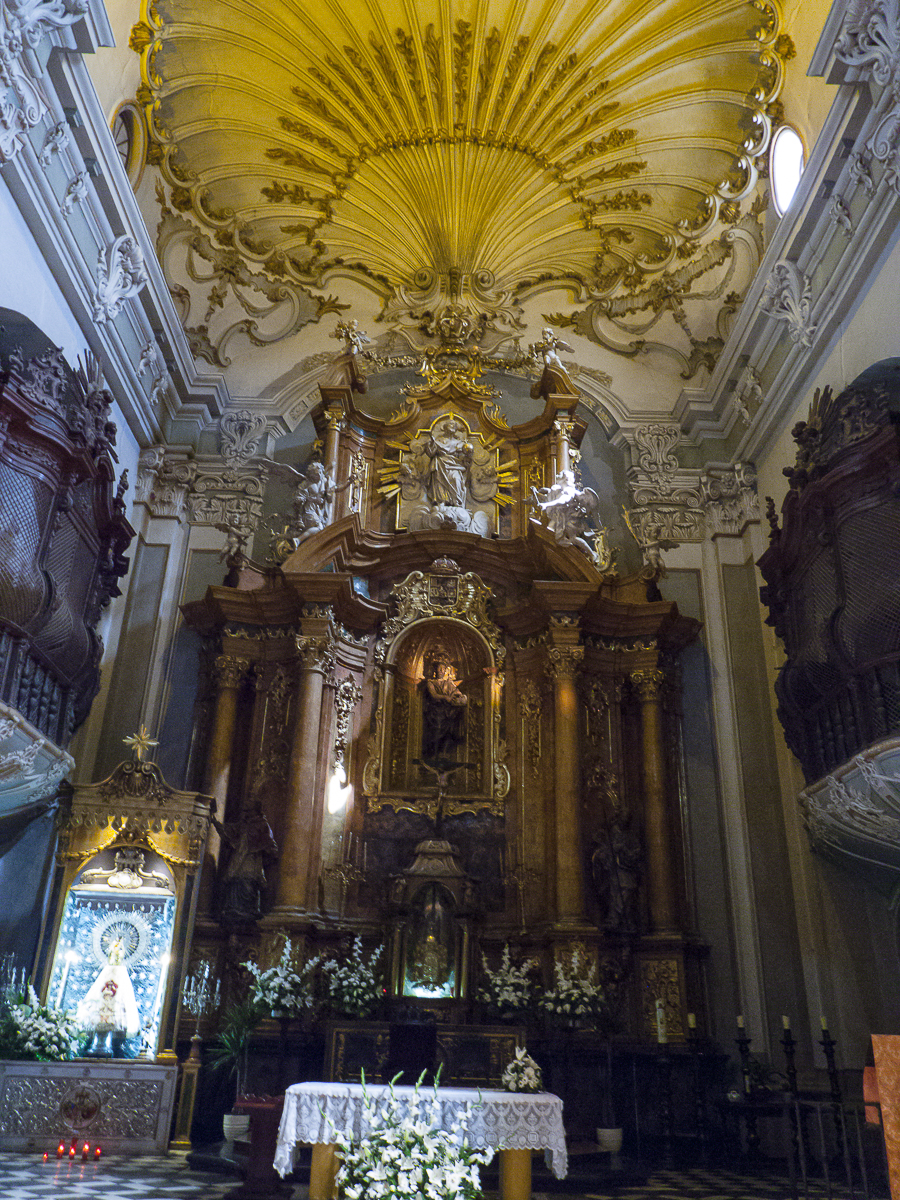
Main altar

The interior decoration was still incomplete in 1769. The main Retablo is a Baroque work of Gabriel Navarro.

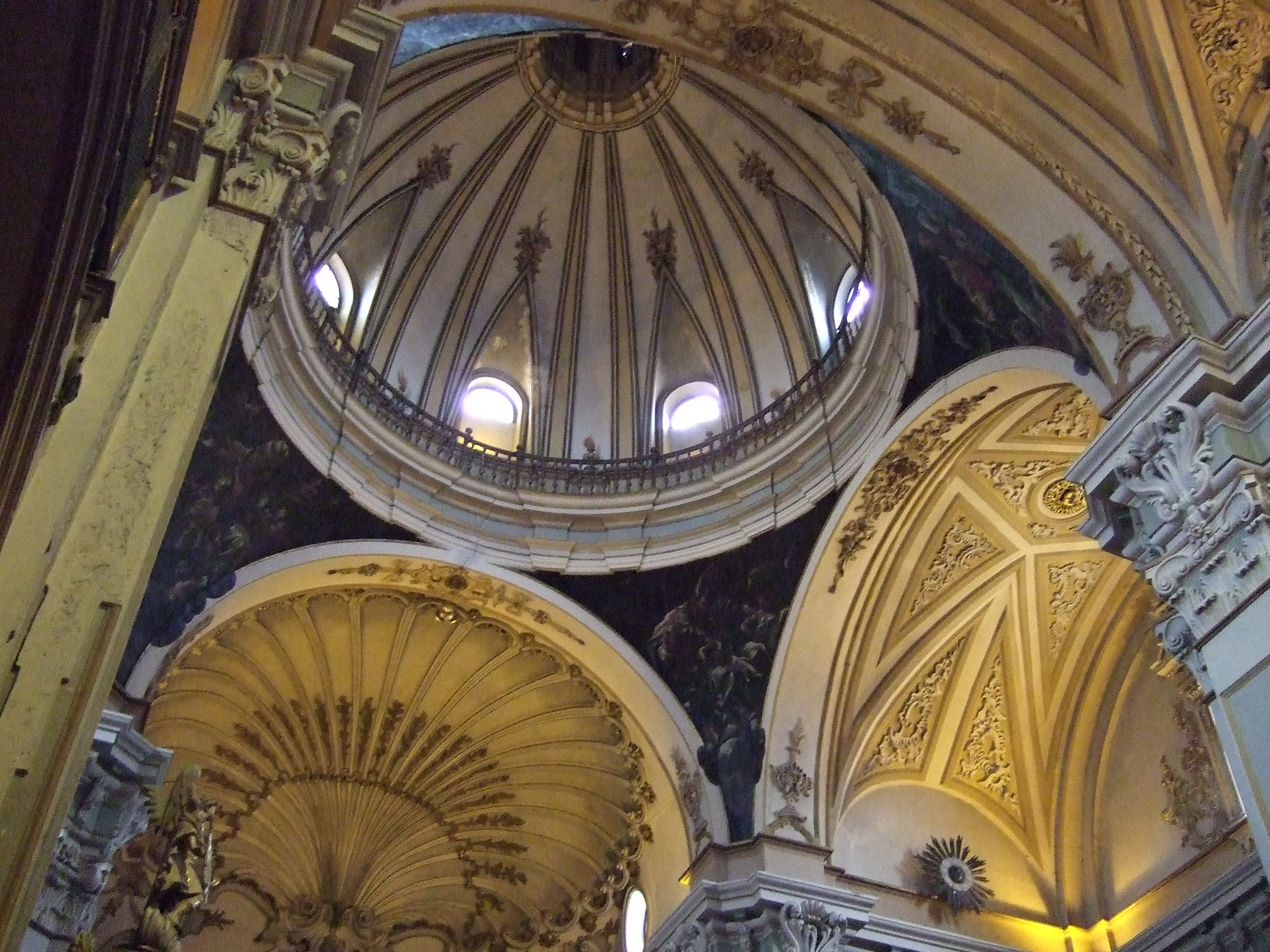
Pendentives by Goya, prior to restoration

The pendentives, just below the dome at the crossing, contain oil canvases by a young Francisco de Goya, depicting the four Fathers of the Church: Saints Augustine, Ambrose, Hieronymus, and Pope Gregory the Great(1766). The project was initially assigned to Francisco Bayeu, but he was recalled to Madrid by Anton Raphael Mengs, and the commission passed to a twenty-year old Goya, who based his work on Bayeau's designs. They had darkened with time, and only recently restored.

At the crossing are two large canvases: the Immaculate Conception by Joseph Luzán and a St John by an anonymous painter. A previous matching painting by Luzán was removed and destroyed because the subject, a Marian veneration known as the Santísima Madre de la Luz was judged to be a Jesuit heresy. The frame was reused.

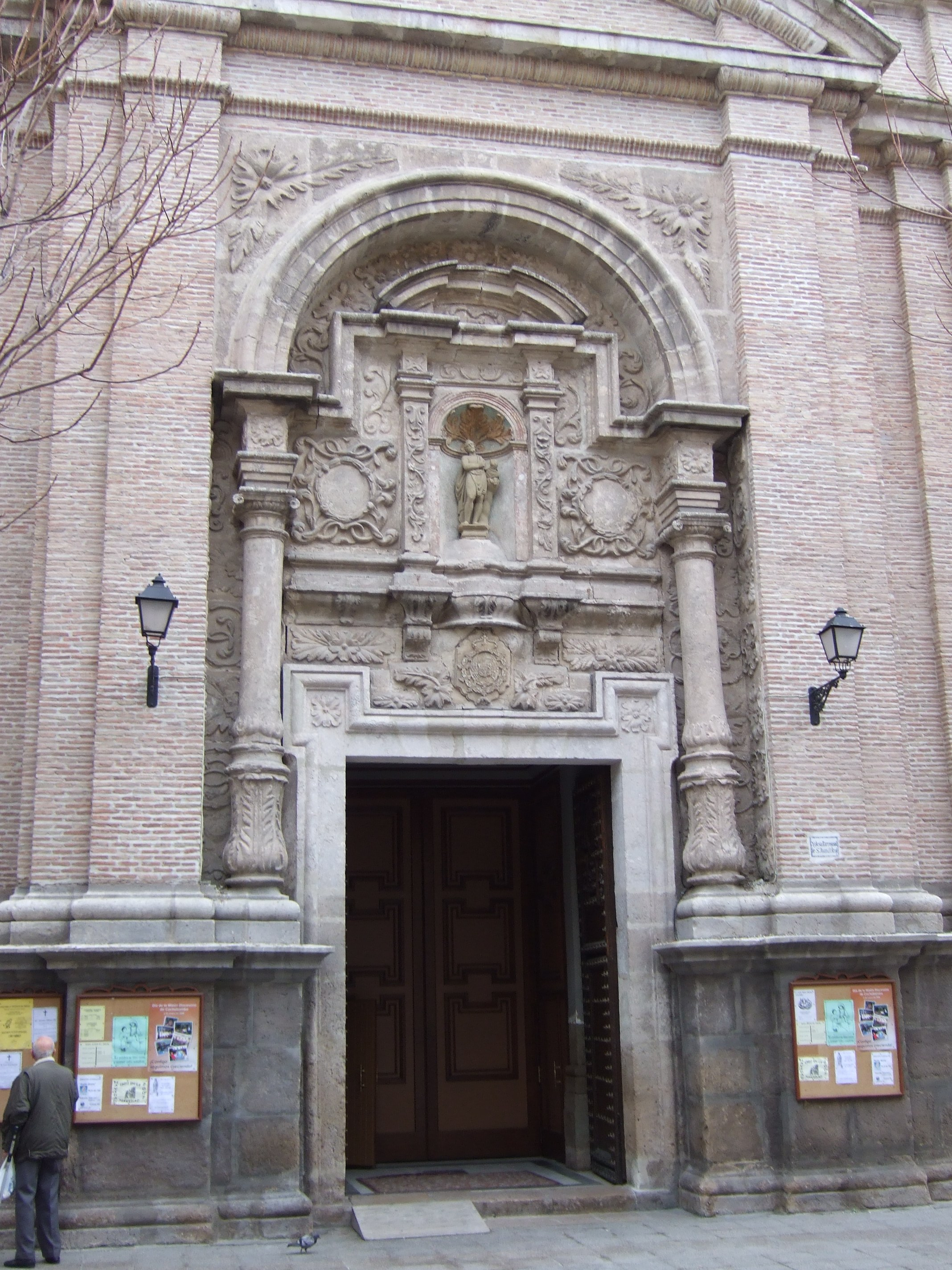
Main portal

The Renaissance-style portal likely derives from the prior church of San Salvador. Above the lintel is a niche with a statue of St John (1774-1777) with the coat of arms of King Ferdinand VI.

The sacristy is now a museum with a display of Baroque artworks.
