= Valdemoro =

- Municipality
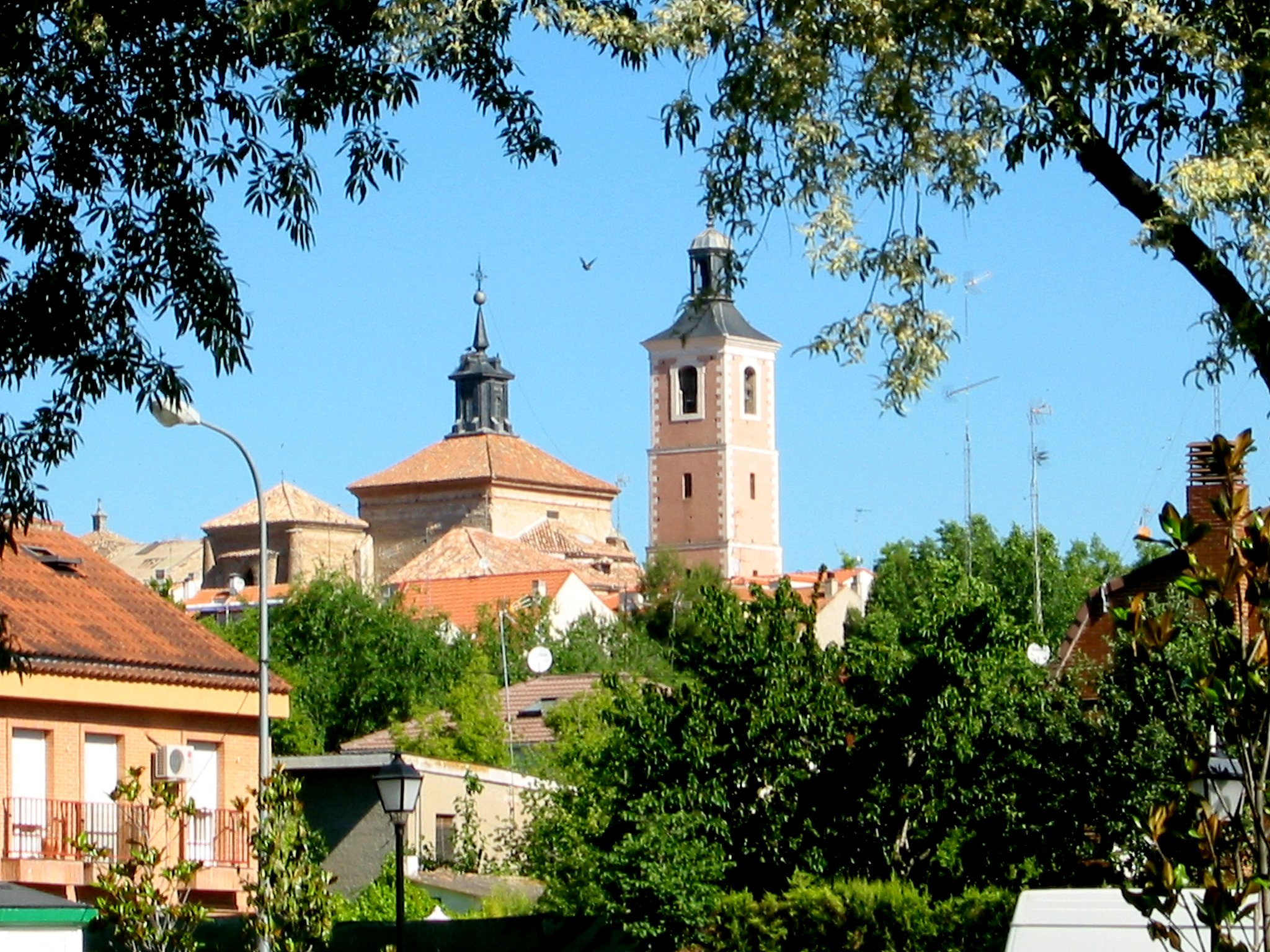

- Flag Coat of arms

- Location in Spain Valdemoro (Spain)
- Coordinates: 40°11′27″N 3°40′27″W
- Country: Spain
- Autonomous community: Community of Madrid
- Province: Madrid
- Comarca: La Sagra
- Judicial district: Valdemoro
- Founded: See text

Government
  - Mayor: Sergio Parra (2019)

Area
  - Total: 64.2 km^{2} (24.8 sq mi)
- Elevation: 615 m (2,018 ft)
- Highest elevation: 712 m (2,336 ft)
- Lowest elevation: 560 m (1,840 ft)

Population (2025-01-01)
  - Total: 85,972
  - Density: 1,340/km^{2} (3,470/sq mi)
- Demonym: Valdemoreños
- Time zone: UTC+1 (CET)
  - Summer (DST): UTC+2 (CEST)
- Postal code: 28340–28343
- Dialing code: 91
- Official language(s): Spanish
- Website: Official website

Valdemoro is a municipal district, located in the Southern zone of the autonomous community of Madrid, Spain. Located 27 kilometers from the capital, Valdemoro is officially part of the comarca of La Sagra, though it is generally also included in the Madrid metropolitan area.

The municipality has experienced strong population growth in the past fifteen years, eventually reaching 74,745 inhabitants (INE 2018). Valdemoro's proximity to the capital has favored the demographic and economic development of the area. Due to the recent population boom, Valdemoro has had to construct new transportation, educational, sanitation, health, and entertainment facilities.

The municipality's recent history is closely linked to that of the Guardia Civil. Valdemoro is home to the Colegio de Guardias Jóvenes Duque de Ahumada, an academy open only to children and orphans of existing guardsmen.

== Geography ==
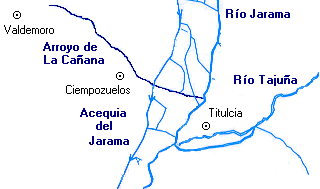
Stream La Cañada

Valdemoro is a located on the drainage basin of the Tagus River on the Southern slopes of the Sistema Central mountain range. The population of Valdemoro is concentrated in the western parts of the municipal district, "along the road that connects Madrid to Aranjuez".

=== Relief ===
The region is mostly flat, except in the area of the Espartinas hills in the South and the El Espartal farmland in the East.

The highest point of elevation in the municipal district is the Cerro de la Mira ("Hill of La Mira") at 712 meters. The lowest point of elevation is the La Cañada stream at 543 meters. The average altitude of Valdemoro is 615 meters above sea level. The ground slopes in an Easterly direction, averaging a 3% incline.

=== Hydrology ===
The La Cañada stream originates in the municipal district, and then feeds into the Jarama River. The Jarama runs parallel to Valdemoro and never enters its limits.

=== Climate ===
A part of the Continental Mediterranean climate, Valdemoro's temperatures average between 13 °C and 17 °C annually. Though winters are relatively gentle, the sky remains overcast and the ground frozen from November to April. Summers are hot and dry, averaging 26 °C in July.

All precipitation originates over the Atlantic and is heavily influenced by the mountain chains that border the Meseta Central and the anticyclones of the Azores. Rainfall is scarce, making Valdemoro one of the driest regions on the peninsula.

=== Flora and fauna ===
Valdemoro does not possess overly abundant populations of flora or fauna, though 794 hectares of the municipal district are part of the Parque Regional del Sureste.

Valdemoro is one of the few locations in Europe where the Russian silverberry Elaeagnus angustifolia occurs naturally.

Recent urban growth has significantly diminished the land available for natural forest growth. The area is also home to 3 species of amphibians, 7 species of reptiles, and 127 varieties of birds (67 species with stable, reproducing populations). Of these species, 21 are hibernating species and 27 are nomadic.

=== Human geography ===
The city of Valdemoro borders the following municipal districts: to the North, Pinto and San Martín de la Vega; to the East, Ciempozuelos; to the South, Seseña and Esquivias; to the West, Torrejón de Velasco.

Valdemoro has 12 neighborhoods: Río Nilo, Brezo, Campo Olivar, El Caracol, El Restón I, El Restón II, La Estación, La Villa, Las Vírgenes, Viva Verde, Las Comunidades, and UDE Norte-Oeste.

== Origin of the name ==
According to legend, the indigenous inhabitants' resistance to the Moorish invaders inspired the saying En balde, Moro, te cansas ("You tire yourself in vain, Moor"). This saying evolved to become the name of the area—Valdemoro. Taking into consideration the short amount of time it took for the Moors to completely conquer the Iberian Peninsula, it seems more likely that the name comes from Valle de Moro ("Valley of the Moor(s)"), a name the area received after the Reconquista.

== History ==
=== Origins ===
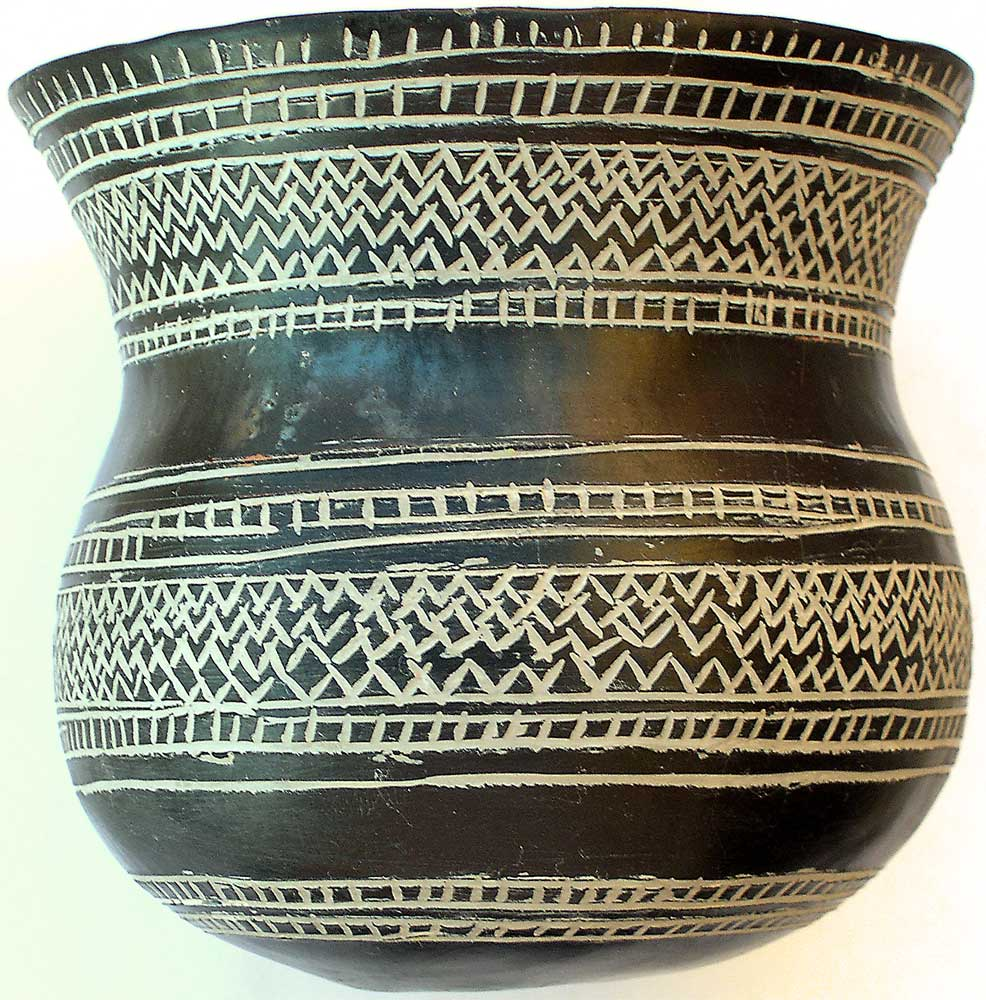
A Bell Beaker vase from Ciempozuelos, Museo Arqueológico Nacional, Madrid.

Copper Age artefacts found in the area include arrowheads, knives, stone chips, and sheets of flint and quartzite. During the Bronze Age, certain strategically located areas were populated in a number of temporary settlements. The earliest indications of a continuous human presence in the area known as Valdemoro dates back to the Iron Age on the farmlands of El Espartal in the Eastern parts of the municipal district

Without a doubt, the most important archeological discovery in the area is the so-called "Ciempozuelo type" of Bell Beaker. Discovered in the extreme southeast of Valdemoro, close to the city of Ciempozuelos (its namesake), these vases, which date back to c. 1900 BCE, are made of gray or black clay and are decorated with geometric motifs. The remains of Roman villa from the Late Roman period, which operated continuously until the Visigoth invasion, can also be seen in the area.

The farmlands of El Espartal have been declared Bien de Interés Cultural ("Area of cultural heritage/interest") as an Archeological Zone.

=== Foundation ===
The discovery of ruins of ancient methods of water transportation confirms Valdemoro's origins as an ancient Moorish settlement. The area was populated before the Moors' arrival, and this indigenous Gothic ( Goths are not natives to Iberia) population resisted the invasion fiercely.

After the Reconquista, the bishops of Segovia and Palencia argued about who would control the settlement at Valdemoro. The settlement was eventually annexed into the Segovian communice in 1190 after the intervention of King Alfonso VIII and the mediation of Pope Clement III. Valdemoro soon became one of the most important municipalities in the Sistema Central mountain range, more so than Chinchón, Bayona, Villaconejos, Valdelaguna, Seseña, San Martín de la Vega and Ciempozuelos.

=== Modern age ===
In the middle of the 14th century, Adelantado Hernán Pérez de Portocarrero of Castile assimilated Valdemoro into his other holdings. By the end of that century, Valdemoro was assimilated into the ecclesiastical dominion of the Archbishop of Toledo. Soon after, King Henry III of Castile awarded Valdemoro the privileges of the designation of Villa, which facilitate the area's social and economic development.

In 1577, King Philip II became so infuriated with the Archbishop of Toledo that he declared Valdemoro realengo (under the direct control of the King). Soon after, Melchor de Herrera, the Marquess of Auñón, assumed control of Valdemoro. During this time, the Convento del Carmen religious community is founded. In 1602, de Herrera's heirs sold the village to Francisco Goméz de Sandoval y Rojas, Duke of Lerma and favourite of King Philip III. Under the Duke's rule, the area undergoes significant social development, including the foundation of the Feria Barroca. In 1605, the Fuente de la Villa ("Village Fountain"), one of the area's most emblematic monuments, is built. In 1616, the Convento de Santa Clara is inaugurated. The most important works of art in the Church of Nuestra Señora de la Asunción are created during the second half of the 17th century.

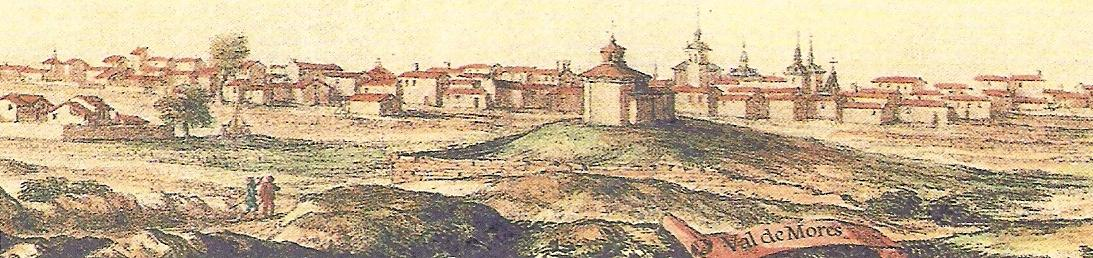
Valdemoro in the 17th century. Visible are the Ermita del Cristo de la Salud and the Church of Nuestra Señora de la Asunción.

Due to the efforts of hidalgo José Aguado Correa during the 18th century, Valdemoro emerged from a period of deterioration and poverty. The arrival of the House of Bourbon to Spain brought a wave of industrial revolution, giving Aguado Correa the opportunity to establish a textile factory in Valdemoro. By the end of the 18th century, Pedro López de Lerena, a Minister in the Courts of Kings Charles III and Charles IV, founded a number of public schools in 1792, and funded the redecoration the Church of Nuestra Señora de la Asunción by artists such as Francisco de Goya, Francisco Bayeu, and Ramón Bayeu. López de Lerena also attempts to revitalize Aguado Correa's factory, but fails, as the population retains its Medieval mindset.

Though the area's economy remained primarily agricultural during the 19th century, the gypsum mining industry began to slowly develop. During this time, Valdemoran wines gained some fame throughout La Sagra. These timid attempts at industrialization were interrupted by the Peninsular War. The French army's occupation of Valdemoro resulted in a significant loss of life, art, and contemporary documentation.

In 1822, during the reign of King Ferdinand VII, Valdemoro was officially declared to be a part of the province of Madrid. In 1851, the ferry line connecting Madrid to Aranjuez is rerouted to stop in Valdemoro. Soon after, in 1855, the Colegio de Guardias Jóvenes "Duque de Ahumada" is constructed on the foundations of the old textile factory. The Colegio remained at this location until it was moved out of the municipality in 1972. The grounds now make up the Parque Duque de Ahumada.

=== 20th century and the present ===
Valdemoro saw a significant loss of life and artistic heritage during the 20th century and especially during the Spanish Civil War. Economic stability wasn't re-established until well into the 1950s.

The restoration of the democracy in 1975 heralded a new era for the district, ushering in widespread urban and industrial growth. The construction of new industrial parks and new neighborhoods (El Restón, UDE Oeste-Norte, Las Comunidades) facilitated Valdemoro's transition from rural municipality to commuter town. This growth continues today, and the population is expected to continue to increase.

== Politics and government ==
The current mayor of Valdemoro is José Carlos Boza Lechuga of the Partido Popular (PP), who was elected in 2011. In the 2011 regional elections, the PP received 45.16% of the vote and 14 town councillors. Other parties in the area include the Spanish Socialist Workers' Party (PSOE), who received 18.3% of the vote and 5 councillors; the United Left (IU), with 10.31% and 3 councillors; and, with 1 councillor each, the Union, Progress and Democracy (UPyD) with 6.09%, the local Partido Independiente Vecinos de Valdemoro (PIVV), with 5.46% and the local Proyecto Transparencia Utilidad y Distribución (TUD) with 5.45%.

== Demographics ==
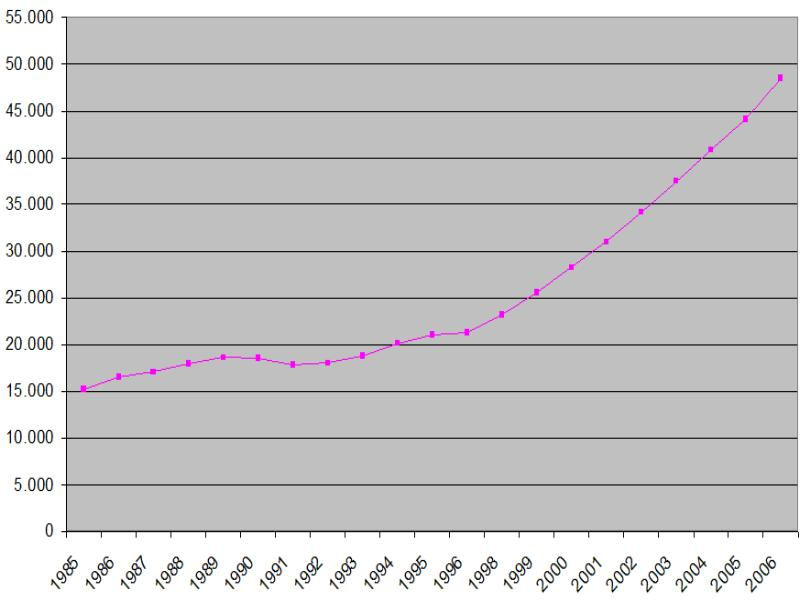
Valdemero's population (1985–2006).

The earliest demographic information available for Valdemoro dates back to 1530, when the official population is recorded to be 2,216 inhabitants. Population remained relatively stable for the next few centuries, oscillating between 2,000 and 4,000 inhabitants depending on living conditions at the time.

In the 1970s, Valdemoro's population began to grow rapidly due to the district's budding industrial sector and its proximity to Madrid. The most notable population increase has occurred since the start of the 21st century: in 2001, the population of Valdemoro was 30,986 inhabitants; by 2007, the population had grown to 53,188. According to these statistics, the relative population growth during the 21st century has been 9%, one of the highest rates in the entire Comunidad de Madrid. Between 2006 and 2007, Valdemoro was one of the top five municipal districts with the largest absolute population growth in all of Spain. The only districts with higher growth rates were Palma de Mallorca, Rivas-Vaciamadrid, Murcia and Zaragoza.

In 2006, the population was divided into 24,351 men and 24,166 women. 20.51% of the population was younger than 15 years old. 6.4% of the population was older than 65, a percentage that was significantly smaller than the 14.45% average of the rest of the Comunidad de Madrid. The birth rate was 18.95% and the death rate was 3.63%.

Foreign immigration has increased significantly in recent years, going from 20.61 people per 1000 inhabitants in 1998 to 110.87 people per 1000 inhabitants in 2006. These immigrants are primarily from Latin America and non-EU Europe.

Valdemoro is the 17th-most populous city in the Comunidad de Madrid and the 131st-most populous city in Spain.

== Economy ==
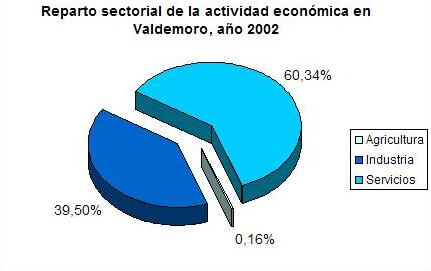
Pie chart representing distribution of economic activity in Valdemoro in 2002.

Up through the 1960s, Valdemoro's economy was primarily agricultural. The territory was divided into 19 agricultural districts: Tenerías, Horcavieja, Espinillo, Cerro del Boticario, Alvarado, Valle de las Monjas, Valle del Infierno, Cuevecillas, Cabeza del Gato, Valdajos, Pocillos, Marguilla, Santiago, Tranzones, Valdereja, Cárcava, Portillo, Mira and Arboledas. Its industry was limited almost exclusively to gypsum quarries which were in the process of going bankrupt due to lack of modernization. Of these, the most important quarry was known as La Integridad.

Valdemoro experienced a wave of industrialization during the 1980s, which resulted in a subsequent rapid increase in population. By 2002, the distribution of industry was as follows:

- Agriculture: 0.16%
- Industry: 39.50%
- Services: 60.34%

=== Agriculture ===
Due to its arid climate, Valdemoro's main crop is cereals, and the main livestock is poultry. Much like the rest of the developed areas of the Autonomous Community of Madrid, this sector is rapidly diminishing in both importance and size.

=== Industry ===
Due to its proximity to Madrid, Valdemoro's industrial sector is considered fundamentally important. Large national and international companies have located their logistical headquarters in the area, including the wholesaler El Corte Inglés, the automotive supplier Lear, the German window & façade manufacturer Schüco, and the oil company Total S.A.

=== Services ===
The service industry, which includes the commercial sector, is the most developed industry in the area. On average, 14.7% of the population works in these fields. The two commercial centers of Valdemoro are the Calle Estrella de Elola in the historical district, and the Centro Comercial El Restón, located in one of the new residential neighborhoods that are currently under construction. There has been speculation in recent years that El Corte Inglés and/or Carrefour are planning to construct a new mall in the municipal district, though this has not been confirmed at present.

== Transportation ==
=== Roads ===
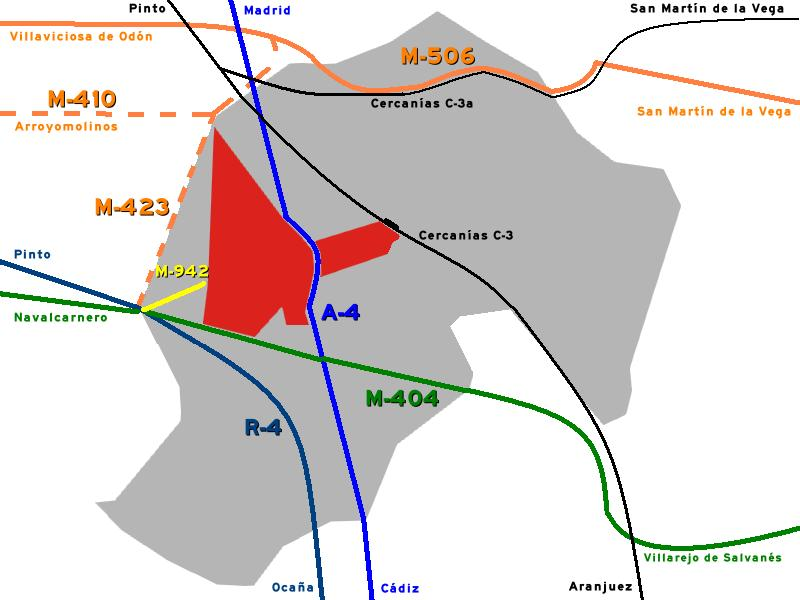
Diagram of various modes of transportation available in Valdemoro

National Autovías

- A-4: (Madrid–Córdoba–Sevilla–Cádiz)

Toll Autopistas

- R-4: (M-50–Ocaña)

First-level Autonomous Roads

- M-506 (Villaviciosa de Odón–Fuenlabrada–San Martín de la Vega–Arganda del Rey)
- M-410 (Arroyomolinos–Parla-Valdemoro) (Under construction)
- M-423 (Variante Oeste de Valdemoro)

Second-level Autonomous Roads

- M-404 (Navalcarnero–Griñón–Chinchón–Villarejo de Salvanés)

Third-level Autonomous Roads

- M-942 (M-404-Valdemoro)

=== Rail system ===
Valdemoro has a train station, with service along the Cercanías Madrid C-3 Line. (Atocha–Aranjuez) There has been some discussion of the creation of a second station in the western zone, but so far no official project has been created. In the last Plan General de Urbanismo ("General Plan of Urbanization"), several tracts of land have been reserved for the creation of a new railway line and station. In June 2006, with the start of the urban expansion project of El Espartal, the government announced that the C-3 Line would make a new stop between the stations of Valdemoro and Ciempozuelos. In addition, plans exist for a high speed train, part of the Alta Velocidad Española Madrid-Levate line, to run through the southern parts of Valdemoro.

=== Buses ===
Urban Lines

- 1 Circular (FFCC – Ambulatorio – FFCC)
- 2 Estación FFCC – El Restón
- 3 Circular (Avda Andalucía – El Restón – Avda Andalucía
- 4 Estación FFCC – Polígonos Norte
- 5 Estación FFCC – Polígono Industrial Rompecubas
- 6 Estación FFCC – El Caracol – Centro Lúdico
- 7 Estación FFCC – Hospital – El Restón

Intercity Lines

- 417 San Martín de la Vega – Valdemoro
- 422 Madrid (Legazpi) – Valdemoro
- 423 Madrid (Estación Sur) – Aranjuez
- 424 Madrid (Legazpi) – Valdemoro (El Restón)
- 426 Madrid (Legazpi) – Ciempozuelos
- 428 Getafe – Valdemoro
- 466 Parla – Valdemoro
- N401 Madrid (Atocha) – Pinto – Valdemoro

Valdemoro has the second-most bus routes in the Community of Madrid, with 7 lines and 572 routes. Only Alcalá de Henares has more daily service.

=== Light rail ===
The government has been studying the viability of a light rail system for the past few years. The proposed line would connect Valdemoro's Cercanías station with the El Restón and UDE Norte-Oeste neighborhoods and the Hospital. The project is part of the Plan de Ampliación de la Red de Metro de Madrid 2007–2011 ("Plan to Expand the Network of the Madrid Metro"). The project was licensed to MINTRA on 9 July 2007.

== Public health ==
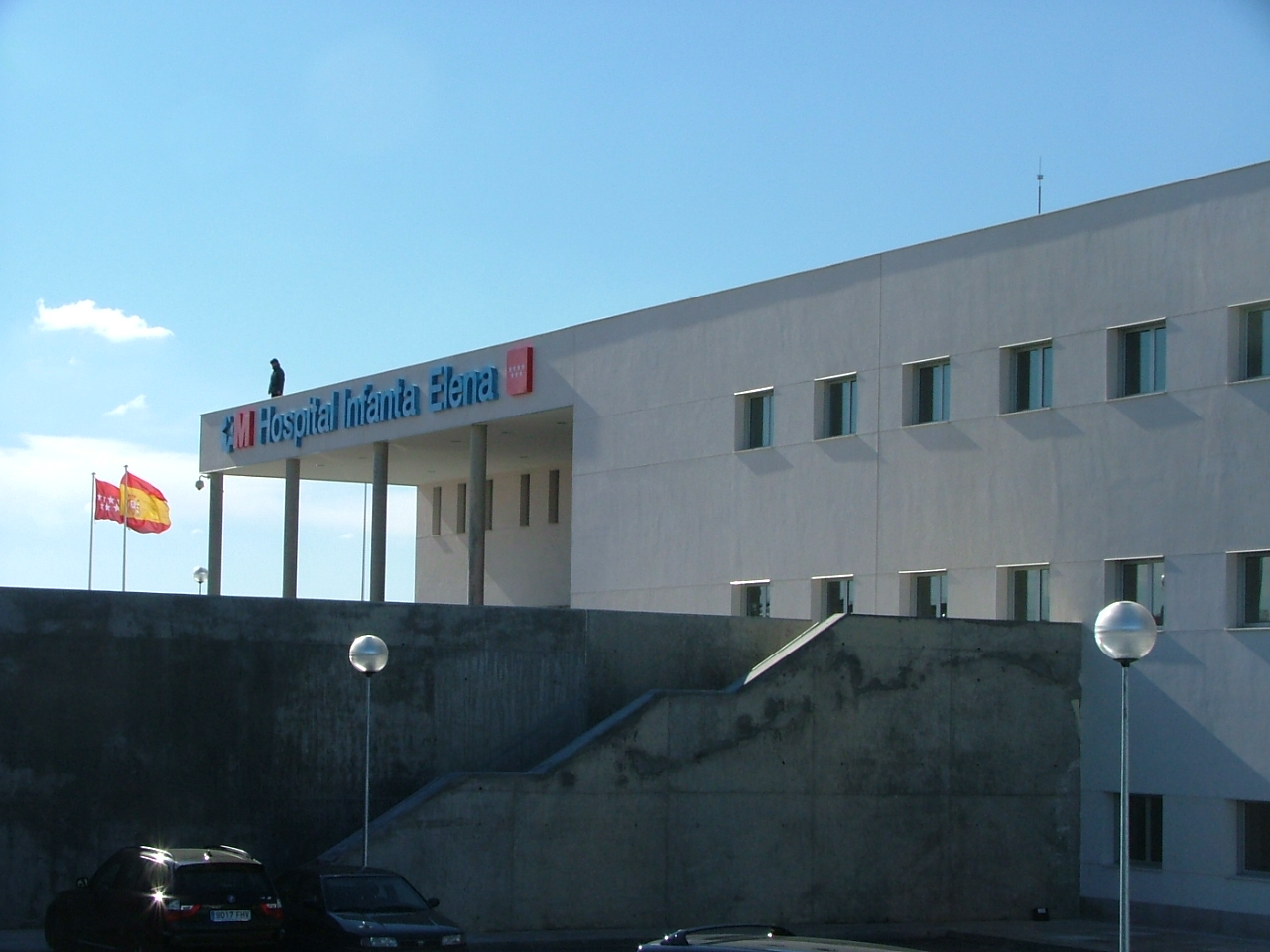
Principal façade of the Hospital Infanta Elena

The Hospital Infanta Elena opened 24 November 2007, providing services to Valdemoro, San Martín de la Vega, Ciempozuelos and Titulcia. It has 100 beds, 8 operating rooms, and 2 maternity rooms, in addition to urgent care facilities.

Valdemoro also has two other health centers operated by the Consejería de Sanidad de la Comunidad de Madrid:

- Valdemoro Health Center
- El Restón Health Center

== Culture and tourism ==
The main cultural center in Valdemoro is the Centro Cultural Juan Prado. The Centro includes a hall of expositions, a library, the Teatro Municipal Juan Prado, and the offices of the Department of Culture, Tourism, and Cultural Heritage. More cultural activities are available at the Centro Lúdico ("Recreational Center") of the El Restón neighborhood.

In addition to the library of the Centro Cultural, Valdemoro has two libraries in the Viva Verde and El Restón neighborhoods, in addition to the new Biblioteca Central built in 2007.

Valdemoro is home to 4 hotels and 6 hostels, with a combined total of 546 rooms. The district's proximity to the Parque Warner Madrid and to the capital are key factors to the development of the local hotel economy.

=== Holidays and celebrations ===
- Fiesta de Carnaval (February)
- San Marcos (25 April), an Annual holiday celebrated in the Parque Bolitas del Airón. Historically, the Fiesta was a religious holiday in which residents made offerings to guarantee agricultural prosperity. The holiday now celebrates sports and other entertainment and cultural activities.
- Santísimo Cristo de la Salud (Early May), the first patronal celebrations of the municipal district. These holidays originate around the year 1650, when local inhabitants sought permission to celebrate an annual holiday in honor of their patron saint. Celebrations consist of concerts, cultural events, and bull fights.
- Nuestra Señora del Rosario (8 September), the second patronal celebrations of the district, dating back approximately five centuries. Much like the fiestas of Cristo de la Salud, celebrations consist of bull fights, cultural events, and various forms of entertainment.
- Virgen del Pilar (12 October), a recently created feastday for the Virgen del Pilar, to whom is dedicated a parish in the El Restón neighborhood.
- Feria Barroca (Early October): An annual artisan market from the 17th century, the Feria Barroca was revived in 2004.

=== Parks and gardens ===
- Parque Bolitas del Airón. The 440 km² green "heart" of the municipality, the Parque is the city's most emblematic park. It contains the Comunidad de Madrid's largest population of Russian silverberry trees (Elaeagnus angustifolia).
- Parque Tierno Galván. Named after the mayor of Madrid from 1979 to 1986, the Parque is the second-largest park in Valdemoro at 120 km². It contains a lake and various small waterways, in addition to a track and a number of playgrounds.
- Parque de España. This 45 km² park located in the El Restón neighborhood contains two lakes, a bike track, and several playgrounds.
- Parque de la Alberiza. Constructed at two different altitudes on a small hill, this 11 km² park contains a central fountain and is surrounded by an arbor of rosebushes.
- Parque del Duque de Ahumada. Located within the historical district, on the grounds of the ancient Colegio de Guardias Jóvenes, the park consists of lawns and gardens of rosebushes and flowers in addition to two fountains and a stand of Japanese wisteria (Wisteria floribunda).
- Jardín del Duque. Located next to the Parque del Duque de Ahumada, the garden contains an ornamental fountain and a sculpture of a Guardia Civil guardsman.
- Parque Andalucía. This 6.7 km² park is located at the Northern entrance to the municipal district. It contains a playground and an ornamental fountain where residents enjoy bathing during the summer months.

== People ==
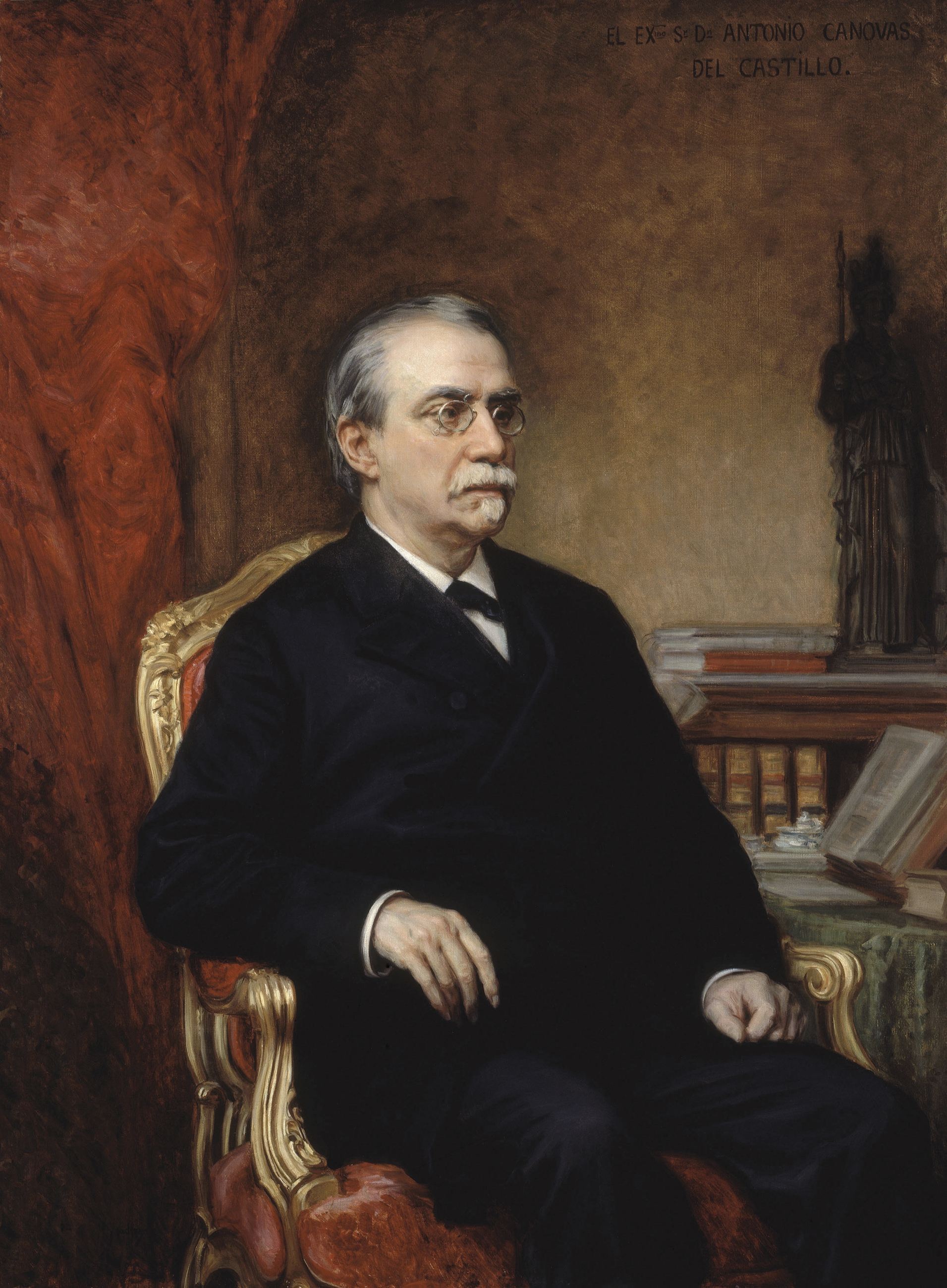
Antonio Cánovas del Castillo, painting by Ricardo de Madrazo.

People born in Valdemoro

- Juan de Castro, architect.
- Diego de Pantoja, missionary.
- Nicolasa Escamilla, bullfighter.
- David Santisteban, singer and composer.
- Jesús España, athlete.

People who lived in Valdemoro

- Pedro Antonio de Alarcón, novelist.
- Manuel Bretón de los Herreros, dramaturg, poet and journalist.
- Antonio Cánovas del Castillo, politician and historian.
- Antonio Cánovas del Castillo y Vallejo, (AKA: "Kaulak"), photographer.
- Pedro Duque, astronaut.

== Sister cities ==
- Zug, Western Sahara. Status affirmed November 2007.
- Gödöllő, Hungary. Status affirmed 2008.

== See also ==
- La Sagra
- Madrid metropolitan area
- Madrid (autonomous community)

== Sources ==
- López y López de Lerena, Vicente (1875). Historia de la Villa de Valdemoro. Madrid, Spain. ISBN 84-89796-13-0.
- de la Calle Hernández, Anastasio (1890). Memoria médico-topográfica de Valdemoro. Madrid, Spain. ISBN 84-89796-11-4.
- Baillo, Román (1891). Valdemoro. Madrid, Spain. ISBN 84-89796-12-2.
- Celdrán, Pancracio (2006). Diccionario de topónimos españoles y sus gentilicios. Espasa. ISBN 84-670-0146-1.
- Martín García, Nuria (2007). Edificios que son Historia: Valdemoro. Ayuntamiento de Valdemoro. ISBN 978-84-606-4133-9.
