= Lastanosa =

- Locality
- Location within Aragon Location within Spain
- Coordinates: 41°51′7″N 0°4′58″W
- Country: Spain
- Autonomous community: Aragon
- Province: Province of Huesca
- Municipality: Sariñena
- Elevation: 381 m (1,250 ft)

Population
  - Total: 38

Lastanosa is a hamlet located in the municipality of Sariñena, in Huesca province, Aragon, Spain. As of 2020, it has a population of 38.

== Geography ==
Lastanosa is located 72km southeast of Huesca.
