= San Juan del Flumen =

- Locality
- Location within Aragon Location within Spain
- Coordinates: 41°46′10″N 0°13′54″W
- Country: Spain
- Autonomous community: Aragon
- Province: Province of Huesca
- Municipality: Sariñena
- Elevation: 313 m (1,027 ft)

Population
  - Total: 349

San Juan del Flumen is a locality located in the municipality of Sariñena, in Huesca province, Aragon, Spain. As of 2020, it has a population of 349.

== Geography ==
San Juan del Flumen is located 71km south-southeast of Huesca.
