= La Masadera =

- Locality
- Lamasadera
- Location within Aragon Location within Spain
- Coordinates: 41°50′7″N 0°2′46″W
- Country: Spain
- Autonomous community: Aragon
- Province: Province of Huesca
- Municipality: Sariñena
- Elevation: 348 m (1,142 ft)

Population
  - Total: 7

La Masadera or Lamasadera is a locality located in the municipality of Sariñena, in Huesca province, Aragon, Spain. As of 2020, it has a population of 7.

== Geography ==
La Masadera is located 73km southeast of Huesca.
