= Sariñena =

Sariñena Sarinyena
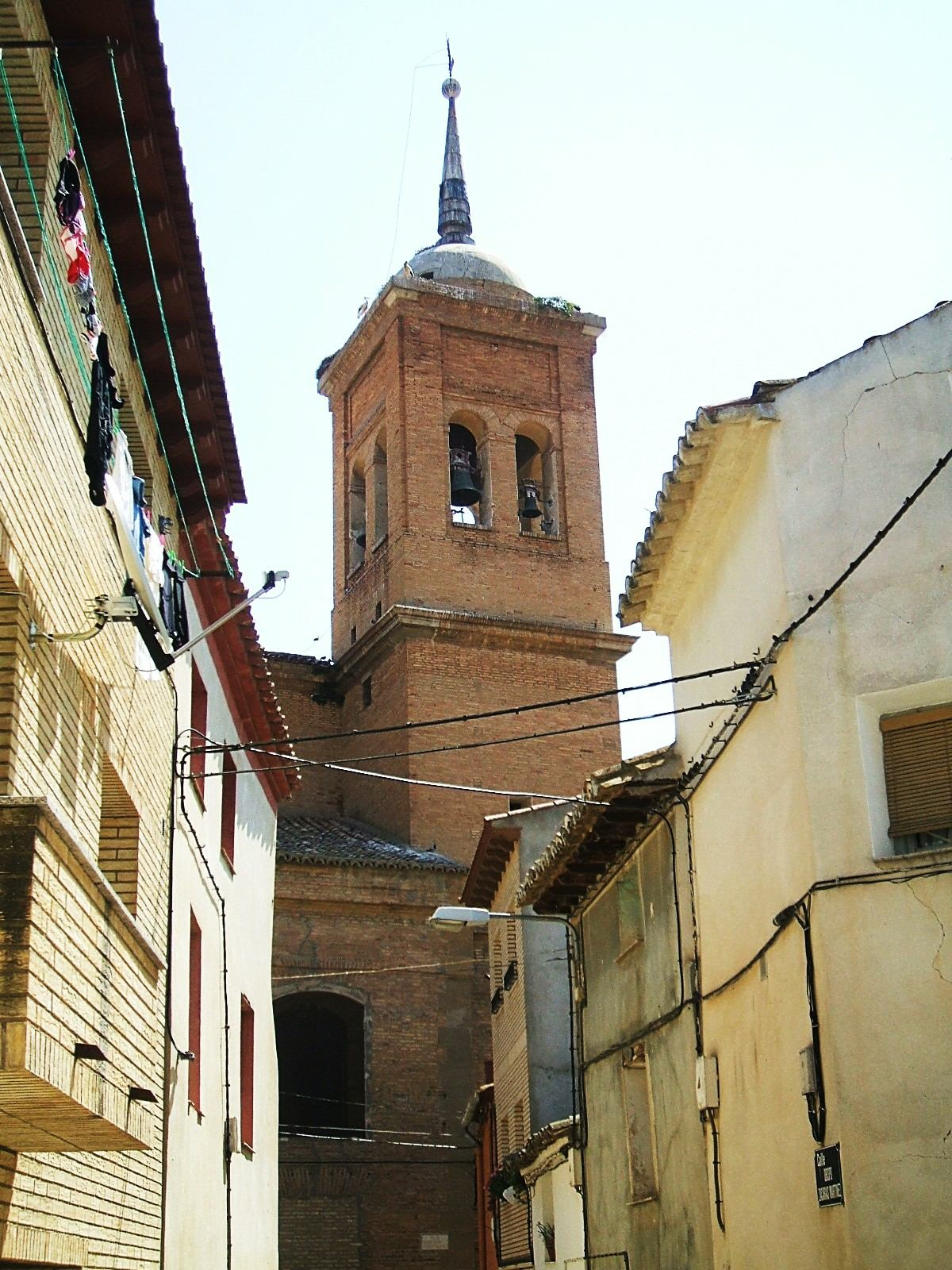
- Bell tower of the church of San Salvador.

- Coat of arms

- Location of Sariñena within Aragon Location of Sariñenat within Spain
- Coordinates: 41°47′N 0°10′W
- Country: Spain
- Autonomous community: Aragon
- Province: Huesca
- Comarca: Monegros

Government
  - Mayor (2019— ): Juan Escalzo Millera (PSOE-Aragon)

Area
  - Total: 275 km^{2} (106 sq mi)
- Elevation: 281 m (922 ft)

Population (2025-01-01)
  - Total: 4,113
  - Density: 15.0/km^{2} (38.7/sq mi)
- Time zone: UTC+1 (CET)
  - Summer (DST): UTC+2 (CEST)

Sariñena is a municipality in the province of Huesca, Aragon, Spain. It is located in the Monegros comarca, near the Sierra de Alcubierre range.

The Baroque monastery of Nuestra Señora de las Fuentes is located in the municipal term.

== Villages ==
- Sariñena town
- La Cartuja de Monegros
- Lastanosa
- La Masadera
- Pallaruelo de Monegros
- San Juan del Flumen

== Twin towns ==
- Mézin, France

== See also ==
- List of municipalities in Huesca
