= Manuel Bayeu =

Spanish painter (1740–1809)

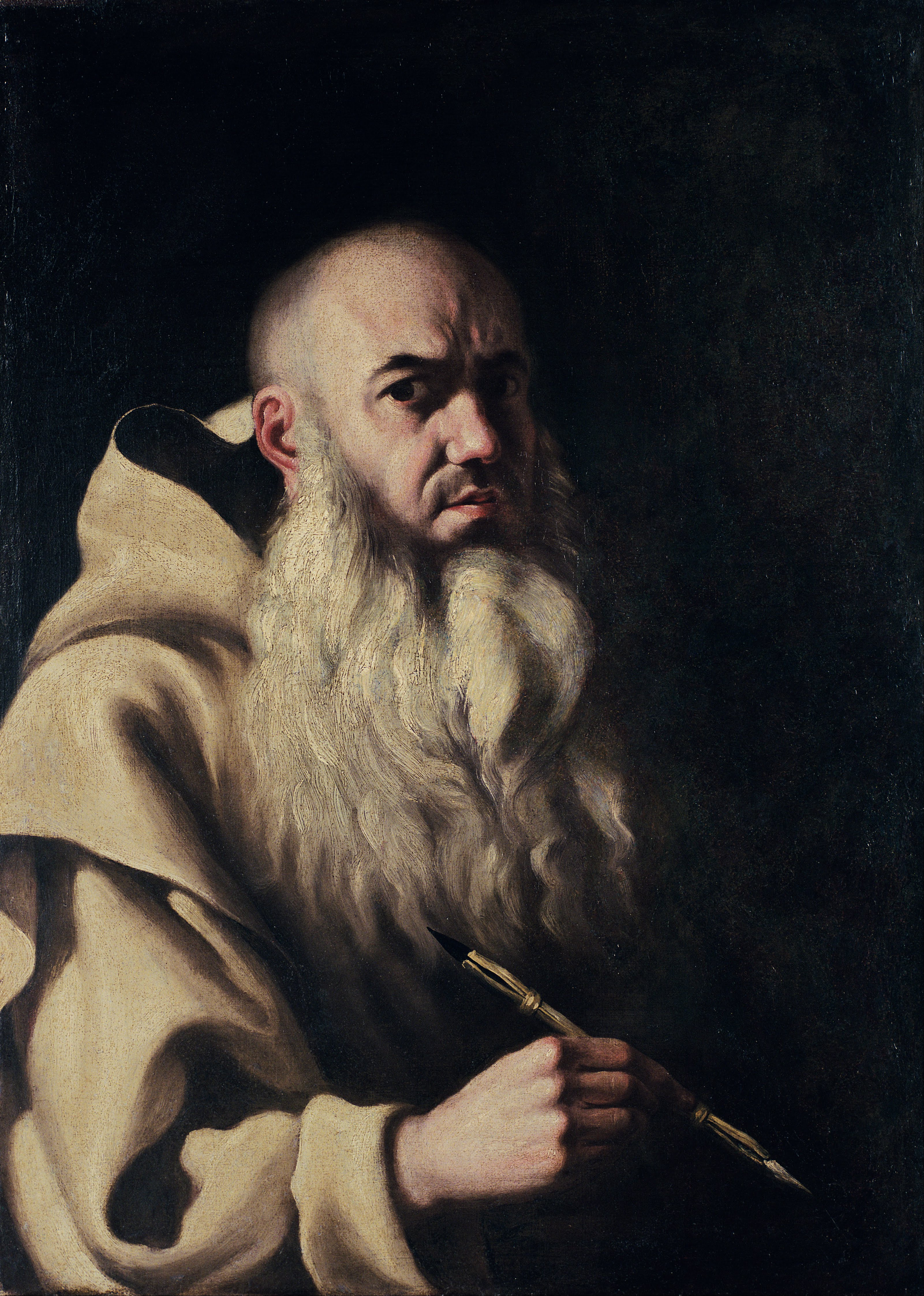
Self-portrait (before 1790)

Friar Manuel Bayeu y Subías (8 January 1740, Zaragoza - c. 1809, Zaragoza) was a Spanish painter, architect and Carthusian monk.

== Biography ==
He came from a family of painters that included his brothers, Francisco and Ramón. What we know of his life is based almost entirely on the personal correspondence he maintained with Martín Zapater, a friend of his brother-in-law, Francisco de Goya.

He was a Carthusian monk at the monastery Nuestra Señora de las Fuentes, where he spent most of his life. He entered Las Fuentes in 1760, and took his vows in 1772.

In regards to his works, it is likely that he collaborated with his brother, Francisco, as did Ramón. In 1779, certain painters in Zaragoza denounced him for not paying taxes on the money he had earned from his works. He asserted that his paintings were all very small, and produced as compensation to those who had rendered some service to the monastery. The publicity worked in his favor and enabled him to receive the support of the Real Academia de Bellas Artes de San Fernando and be officially recognized as an artist.

His best known works are very casual, personal drawings, produced while he was at Las Fuentes, which are now in the Museo de Huesca. He also did some work in Los Monegros and Lalueza, and at the Royal Monastery of Santa María de Sigena, as well as the santuario de la Virgen de Magallón in Leciñena. Some paintings in Huesca Cathedral and Jaca Cathedral are attributed to him. Much of the work he did in Zaragoza has disappeared.

Near the end of his life, his Superior sent him to Mallorca, to create a mural at the Valldemossa Charterhouse. There, he made friends with Gaspar Melchor de Jovellanos, who had been banished to Bellver Castle.

It is not known exactly when he died but, most likely, it was during the Peninsular War, in the Second Siege of Zaragoza.

== Selected works ==
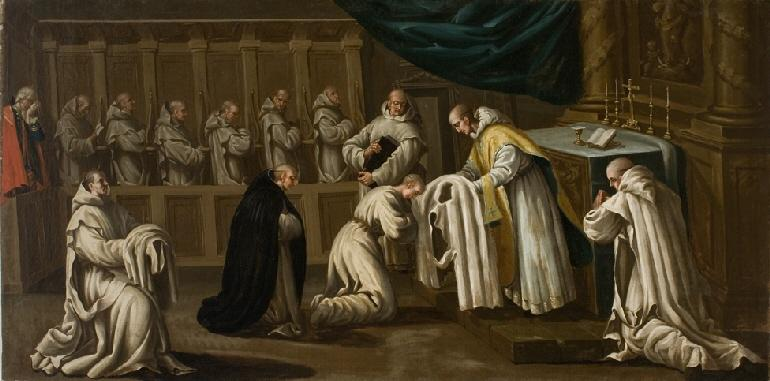
Saint Bruno Presents the Habit to a Postulant

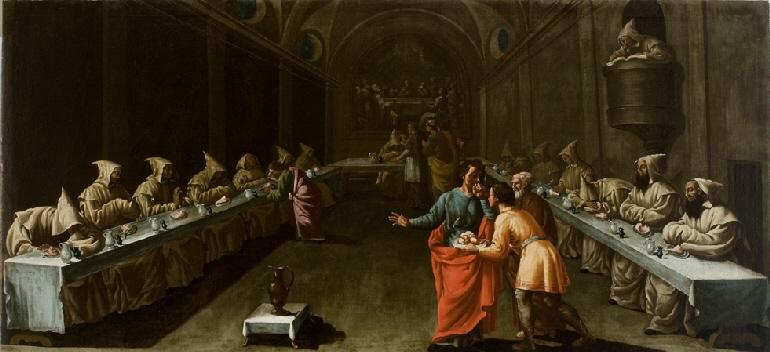
Saint Hugh in the Refectory

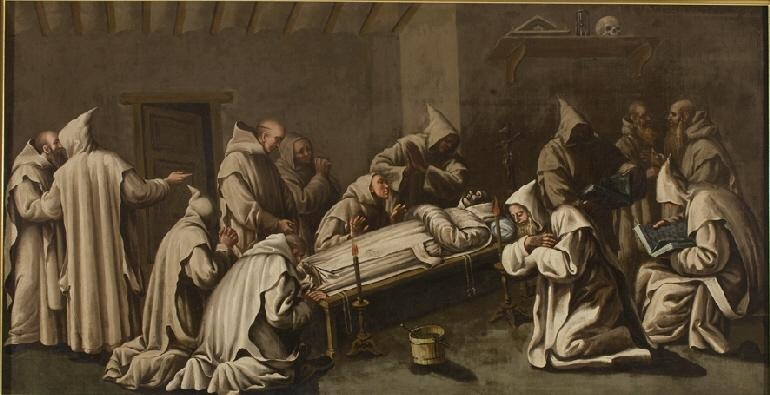
The Death of Saint Bruno

== Sources ==
- VV.AA. Revista de la Comarca de Los Monegros, 2005. ISBN 84-7753-280-X
