= Nuestra Señora de las Fuentes =

Carthusian monastery in Aragon, Spain

Coordinates: 41°44′24″N 0°17′24″W

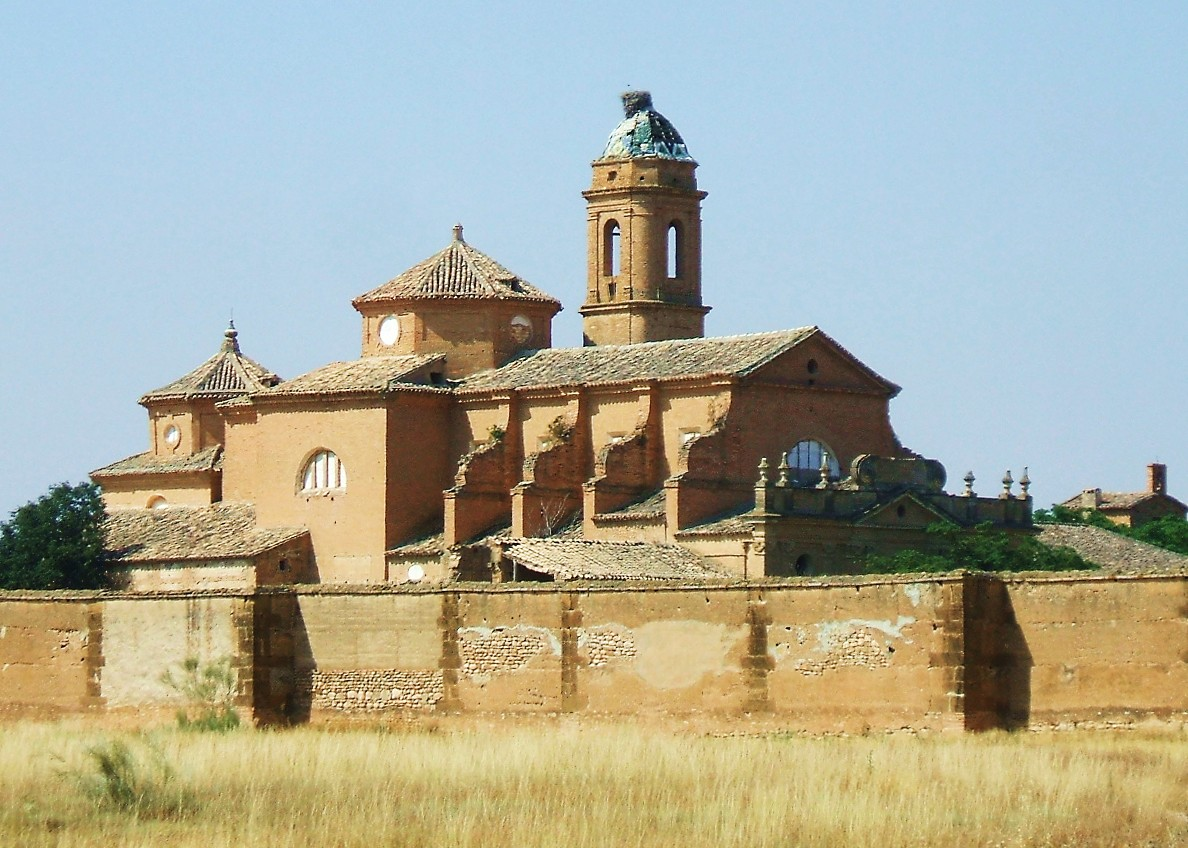
Charterhouse of Nuestra Señora de las Fuentes

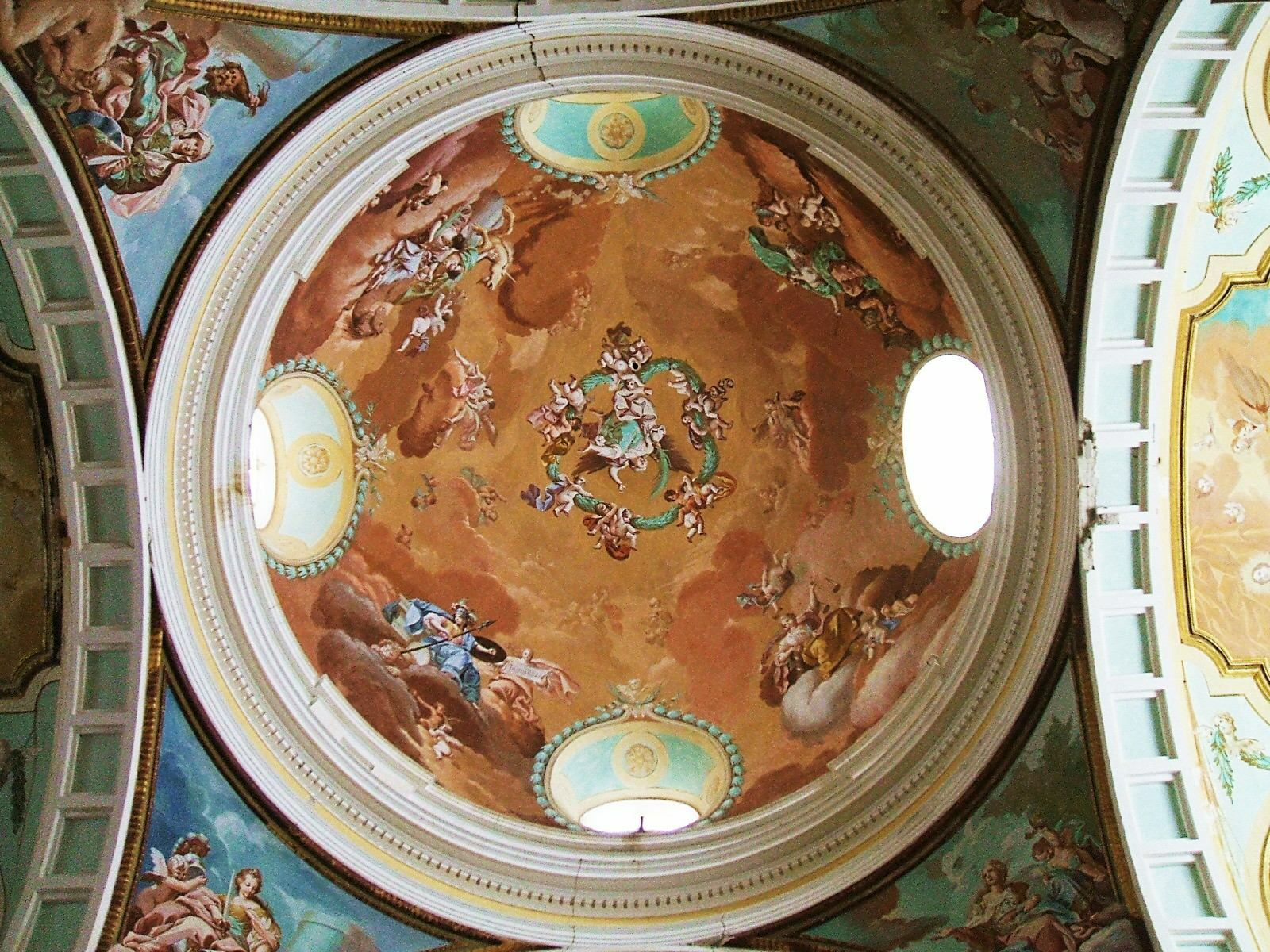
Detail of the paintings in the transept

Nuestra Señora de las Fuentes is a Carthusian monastery in Sariñena, province of Huesca, Aragon, Spain.

Built in Baroque style, it is characterized by a large series of religious paintings in its interior. It was founded in 1507 by the counts of Sástago.

The interior walls were decorated from 1770 to 1780 by Manuel Bayeu, including a total of 250 frescoes featuring brilliant colors. The paintings depict scenes from the Gospels and lives of saints, apostles and other religious themes.

== See also ==
- Catholic Church in Spain
