= Pallaruelo de Monegros =

- Locality
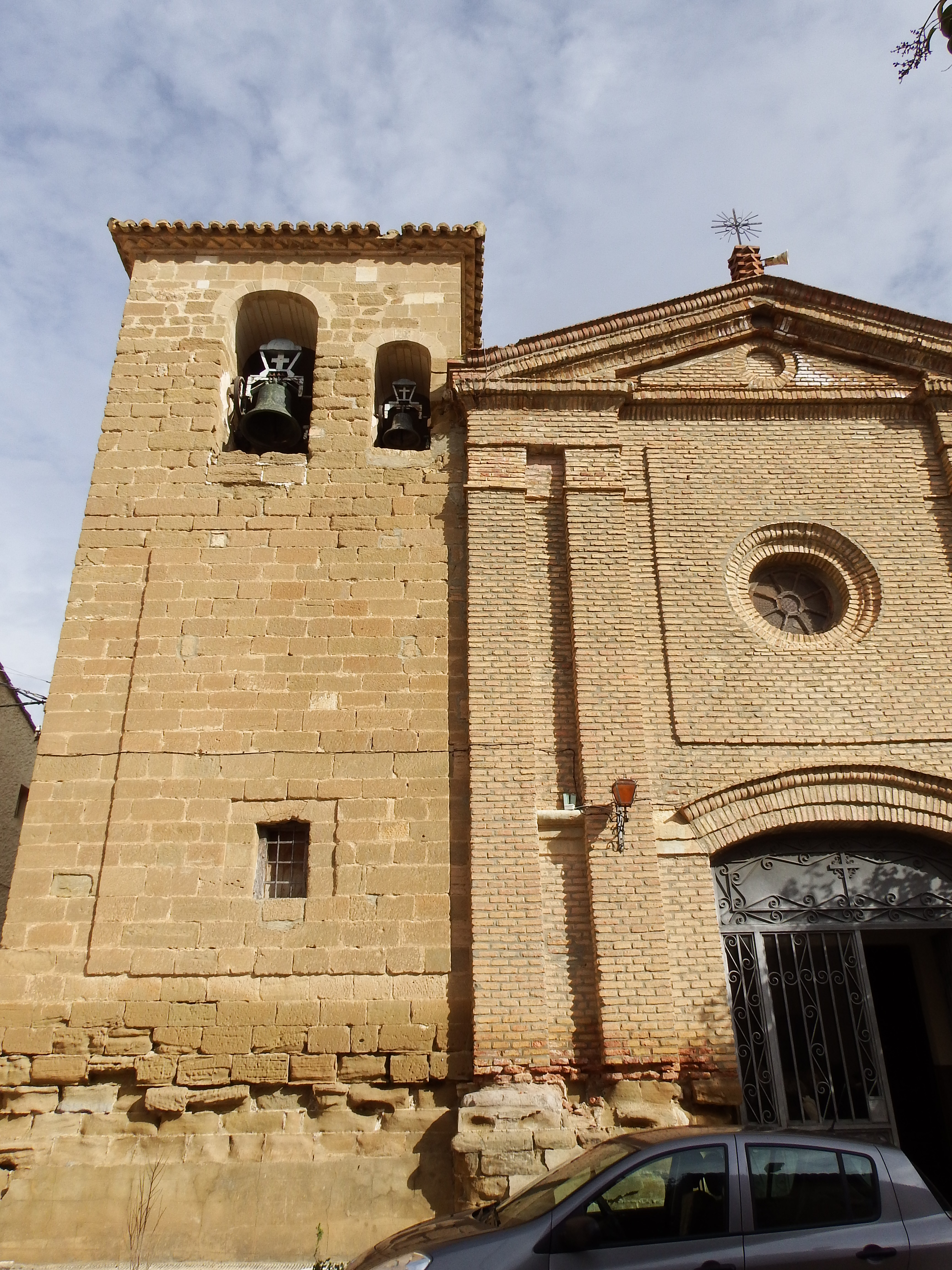

- Location within Aragon Location within Spain
- Coordinates: 41°42′16″N 0°12′31″W
- Country: Spain
- Autonomous community: Aragon
- Province: Province of Huesca
- Municipality: Sariñena
- Elevation: 333 m (1,093 ft)

Population
  - Total: 99

Pallaruelo de Monegros is a locality in the municipality of Sariñena, in Huesca province, Aragon, Spain. As of 2020, it had a population of 99.

== Geography ==
Pallaruelo de Monegros is located 69km south-southeast of Huesca.
