= La Cartuja de Monegros =

- Locality
- Location within Aragon Location within Spain
- Coordinates: 41°45′20″N 0°17′18″W
- Country: Spain
- Autonomous community: Aragon
- Province: Province of Huesca
- Municipality: Sariñena
- Elevation: 360 m (1,180 ft)

Population
  - Total: 266

La Cartuja de Monegros is a locality located in the municipality of Sariñena, in Huesca province, Aragon, Spain. As of 2020, it has a population of 266.

== Geography ==
La Cartuja de Monegros is located 67km south-southeast of Huesca.
