= Ramón Bayeu =

Spanish painter (1744–1793)

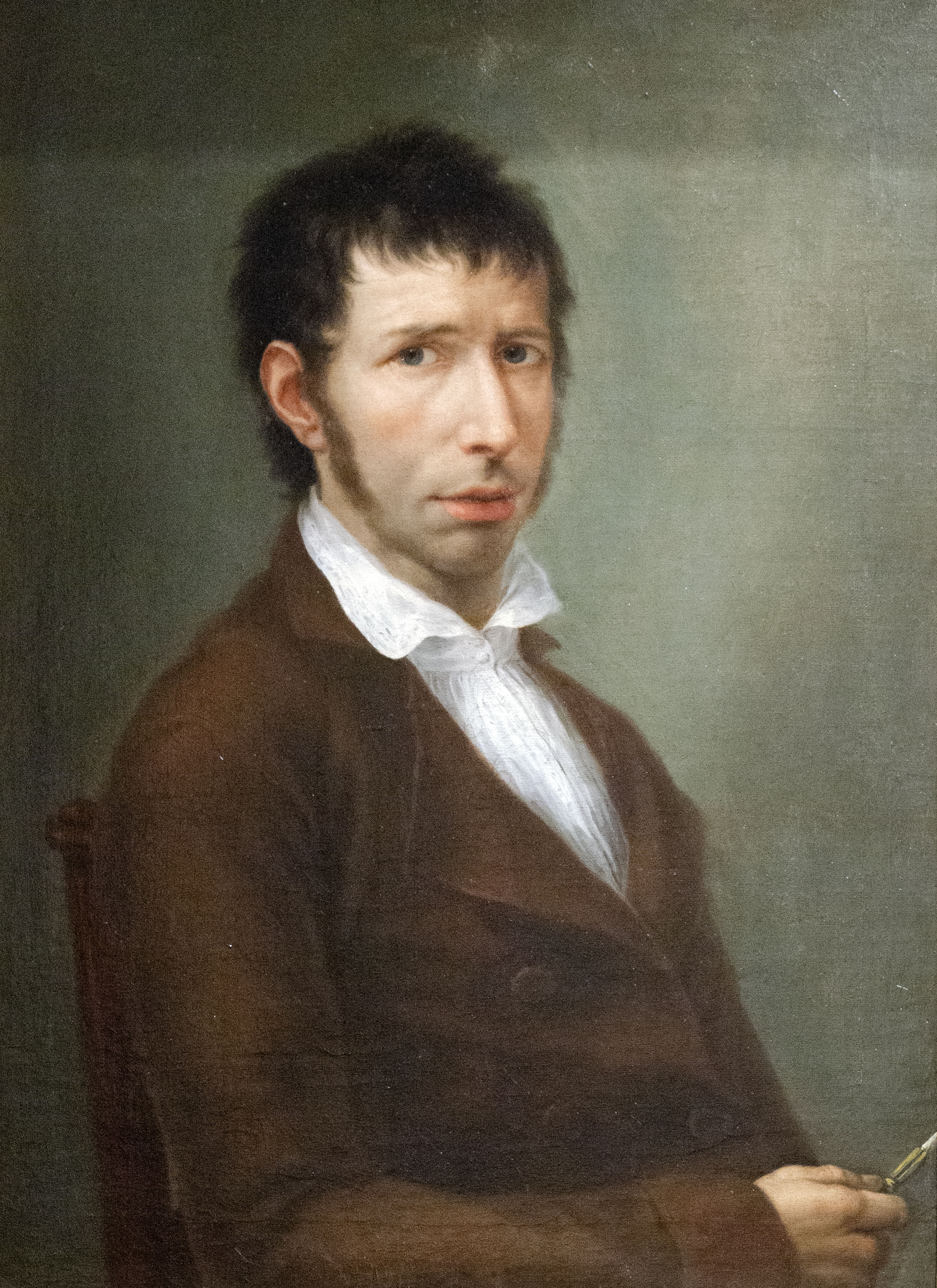
Self-portrait (c. 1790)

Ramón Bayeu y Subías (2 December 1744, Zaragoza – 1 March 1793, Aranjuez) was a Spanish Neoclassicist painter; known primarily for his work in tapestry design.

== Biography ==
His father made surgical instruments and barbers' tools. He was the brother of Francisco Bayeu, with whom he worked, and Manuel Bayeu, also a painter. In 1758, when Francisco received a scholarship to study in Madrid, Ramón and his siblings followed; having been orphaned. Francisco was expelled in 1759, so Ramón returned to Zaragoza with him and became his first student.

In 1763, when Francisco was given a position at the Royal Tapestry Factory by King Charles III, he went back to Madrid and enrolled at the Real Academia de Bellas Artes de San Fernando. In 1766, he received a scholarship to study in Italy.

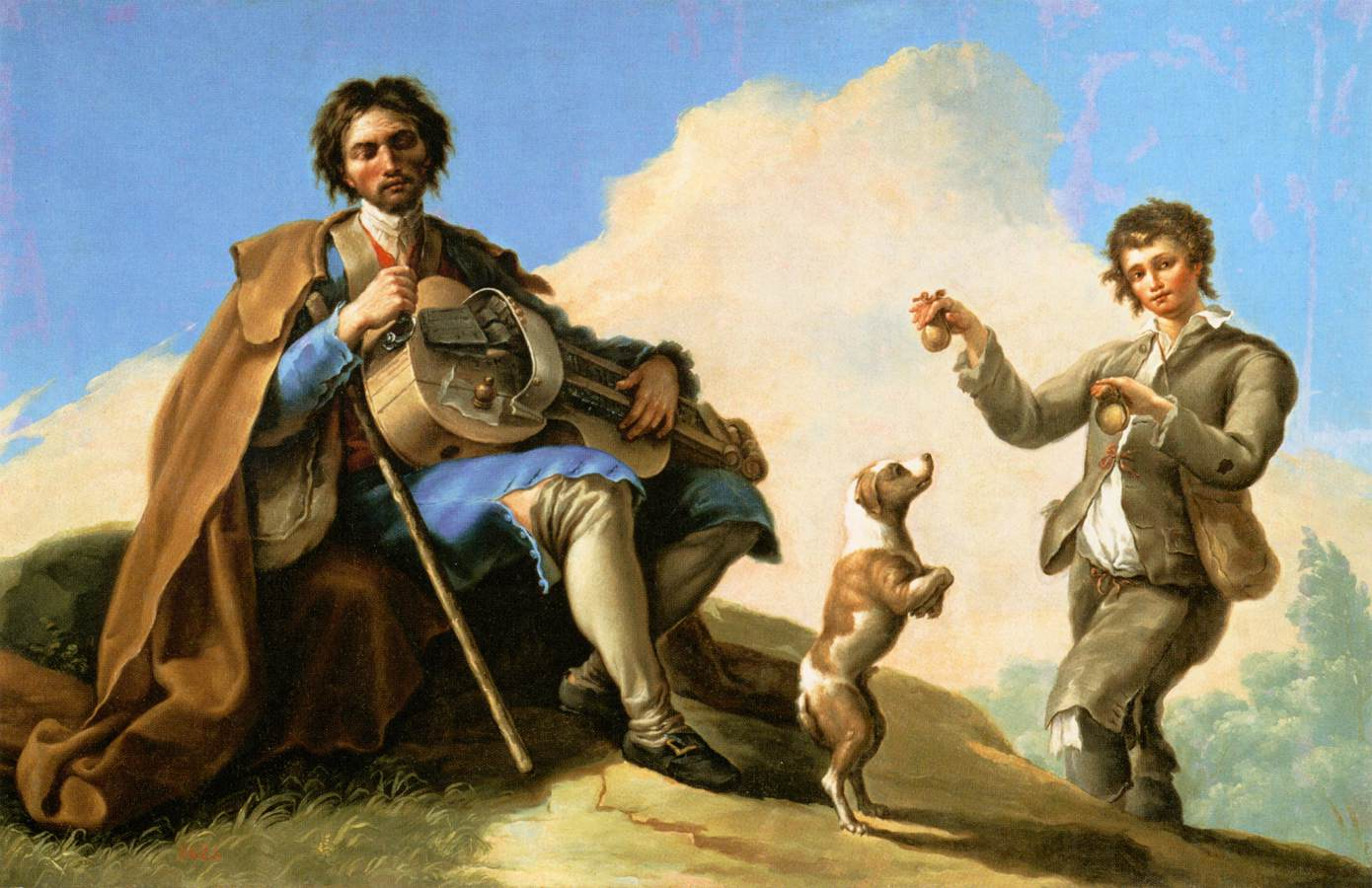
The Blind Singer

After 1773, he painted designs and "cartones" (cartoons) for the tapestry factory; creating 35 in all. several of which became well known through reproductions. He collaborated with his brother-in-law, Francisco Goya, on several commissions; at the Royal Monastery in Valladolid and the Church of Our Lady of the Assumption in Valdemoro. He also executed several frescoes in the Basilica of Our Lady of the Pillar in Zaragoza.

He served as assistant director of the factory from 1765. In 1776, he applied for a position as "Painter to the King" and, although he did not receive the title, was awarded an annual pension of 8,000 reales. He applied again, unsuccessfully, in 1778. When the factory's operations were suspended in 1780, due to lack of funds, he worked as an itinerant painter for five years. In 1786, following a request by Francisco and Mariano Salvador Maella, he was appointed Director of the factory; a position he held until his death. An application for court painter, made in 1788, was not successful. In 1791, he refused to continue painting cartones, in light of the religious works and portraits he had done, but was threatened with a suspension of his salary. As a compromise, he was also made a court painter, but without extra pay.

In 1792, he began to display the serious symptoms of lead poisoning, which he had contracted years before while free-lancing. Despite a rest period, he continued to worsen. He died the following year, while in Aranjuez, working on a project for the King. He had never married and left no heirs.

Many of his engravings reproduce famous paintings, such as Guercino's Liberation of St. Peter, now housed in the Museo del Prado, which also preserves some of his cartones.

== Gallery ==
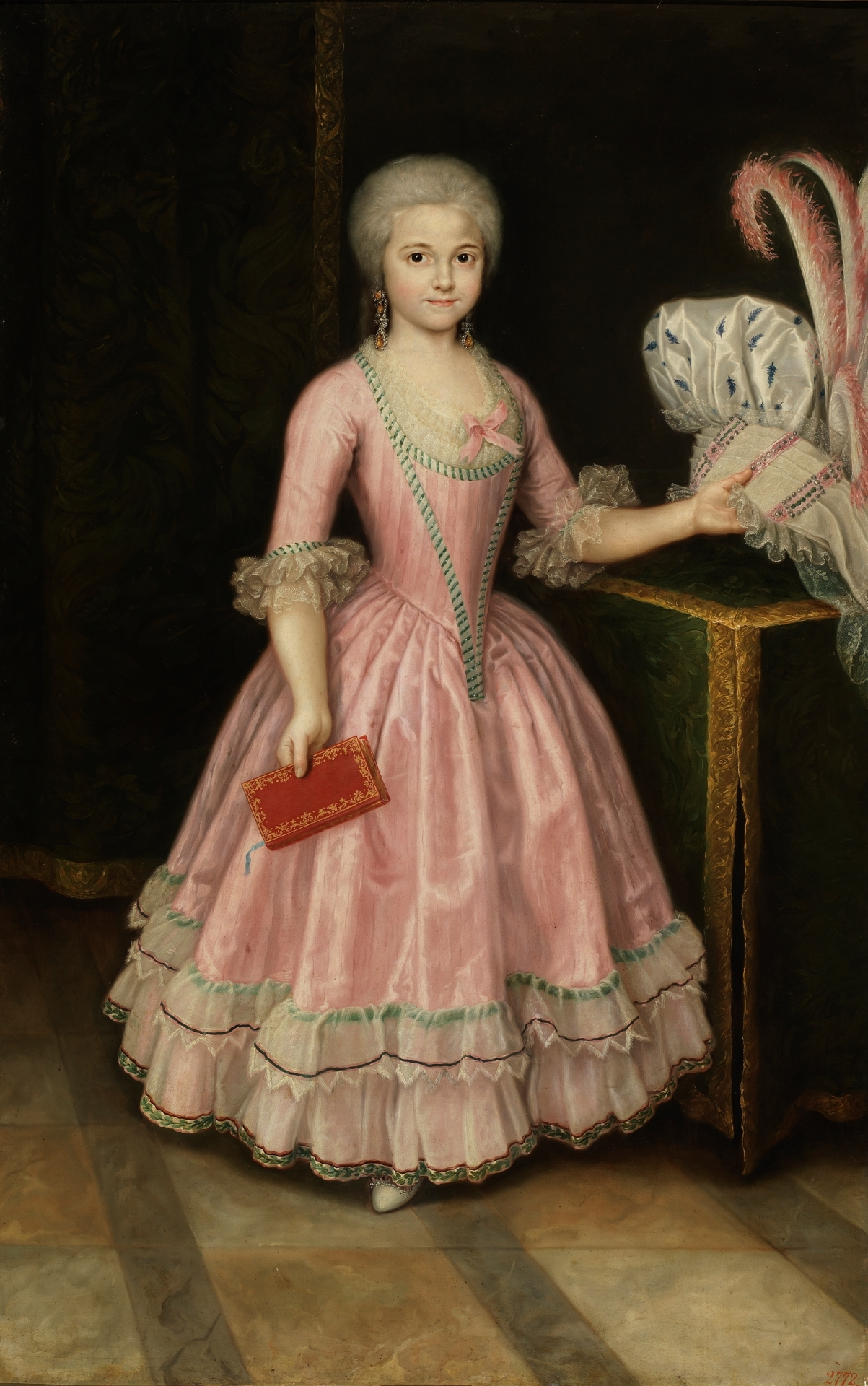
The Infanta María Amalia of Spain

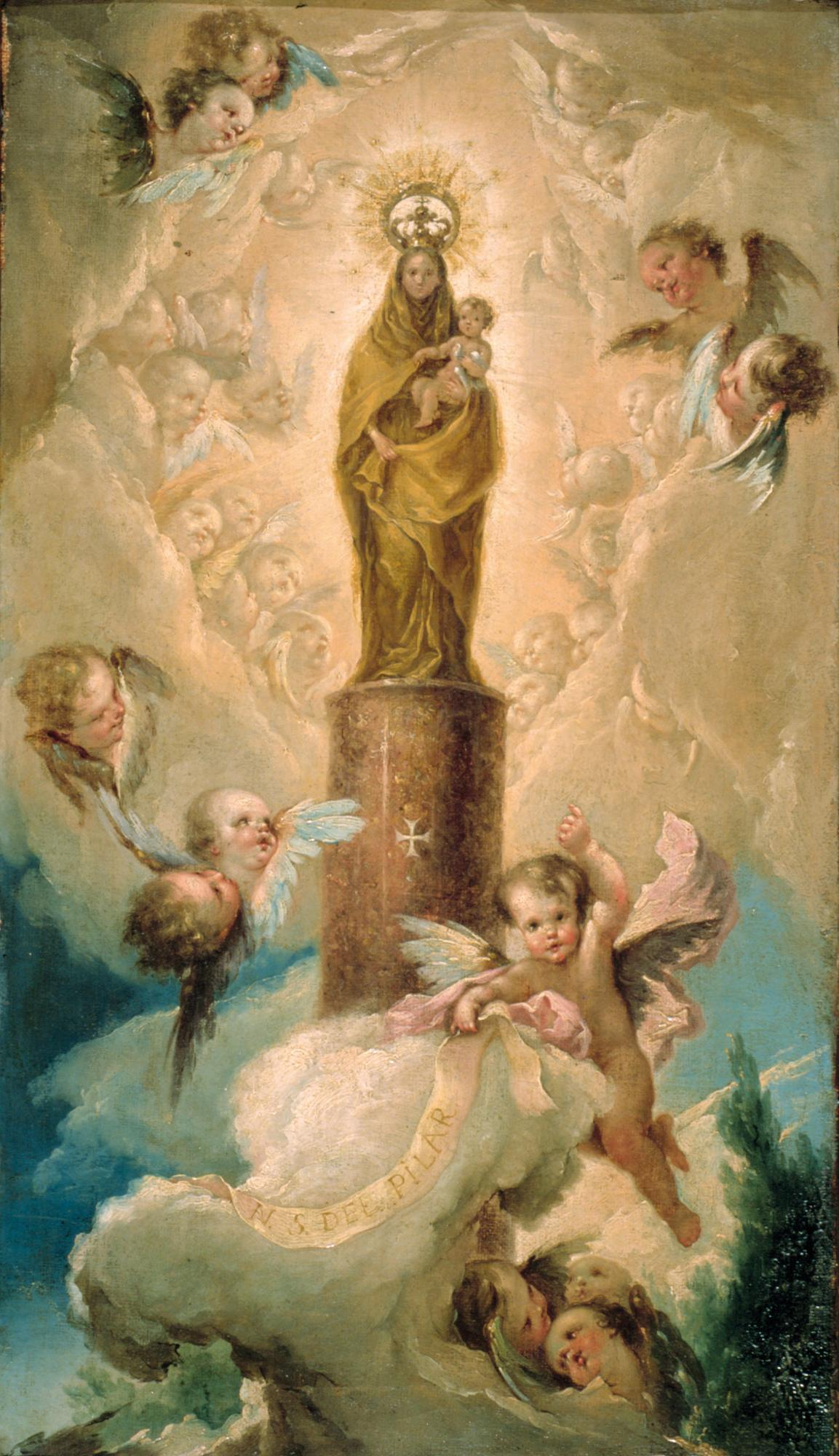
Our Lady of the Pillar

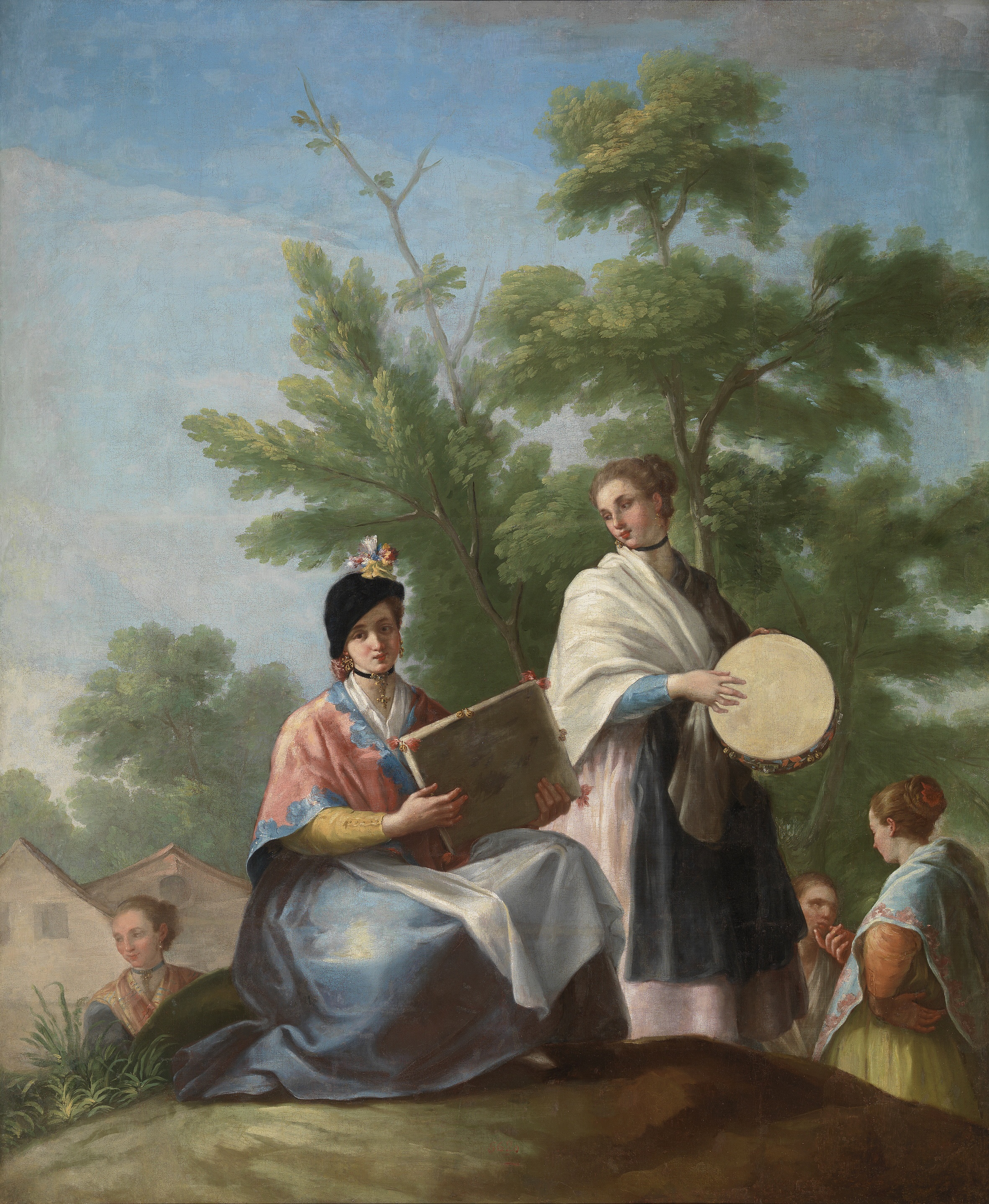
Girls playing the tambourine

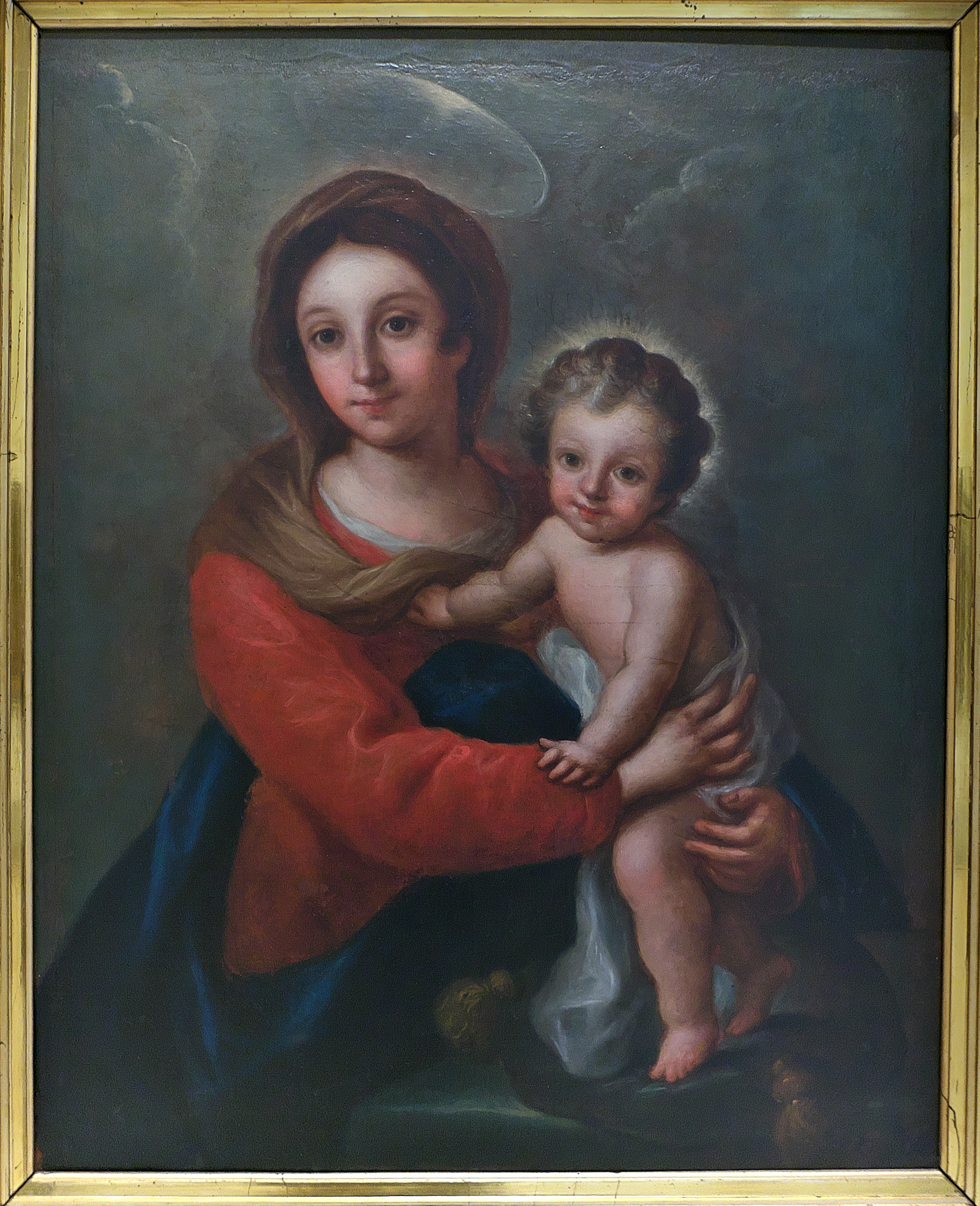
The Virgin and Child

== Sources ==
- "Ramón Bayeu: obras destruidas y desaparecidas", by José Luis Morales y Marín], Biblioteca Virtual Miguel de Cervantes.
