= Francisco Bayeu y Subías =

Spanish artist (1734–1795)

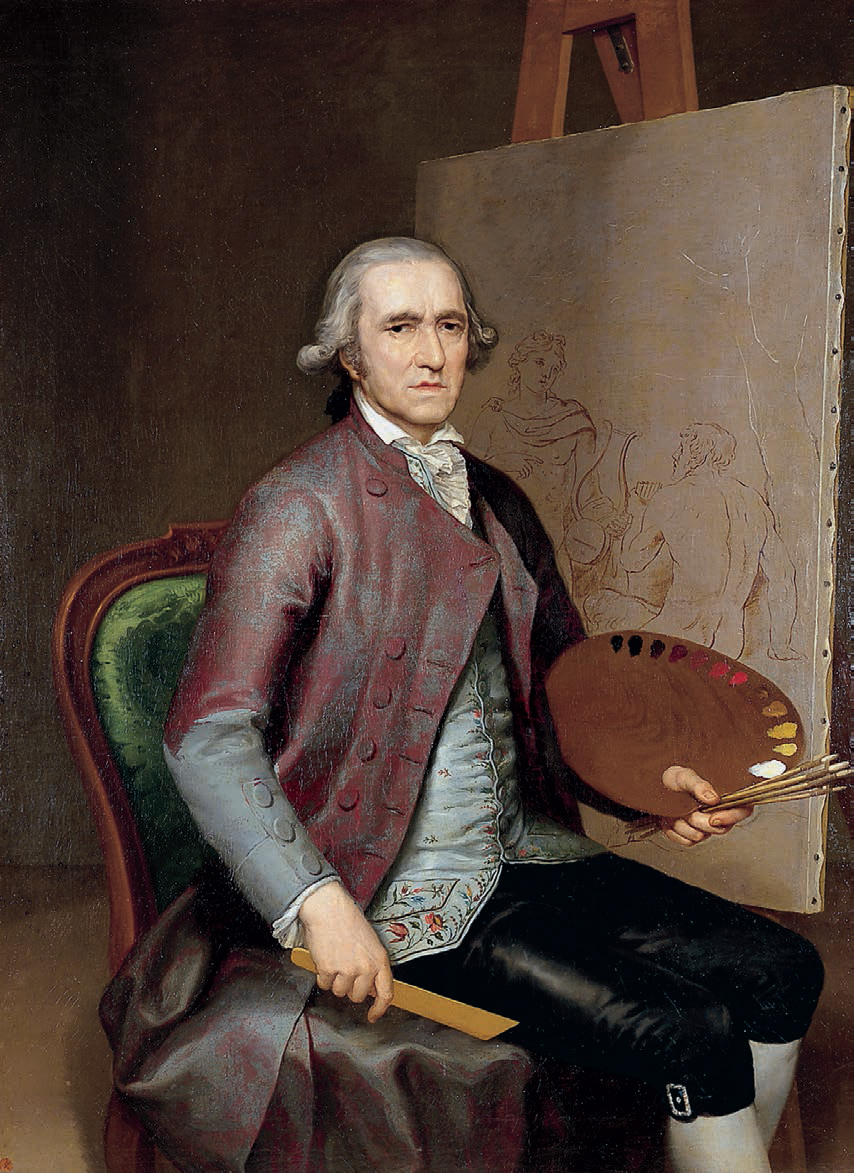
1792 self-portrait of Bayeu

Francisco Bayeu y Subías (9 March 1734 – 4 August 1795) was a Spanish painter who painted in the Neoclassic style and specialised in religious and historical themes. He is best known for his frescoes. His brothers Ramón and Manuel Bayeu were also well-known painters.

== Biography ==
His father made surgical instruments and barbers' tools. He received a broad childhood education, possibly from the Jesuits. His initial art studies were with a local master, José Luzán (who had studied with Francesco Solimena in Naples), Antonio González Velázquez, for whom he worked as an assistant, and Juan Andrés Merklein. In 1758, when Francisco received a scholarship to study in Madrid, at the Real Academia de Bellas Artes de San Fernando, his siblings followed; having been orphaned. González, who was then living in Madrid, helped support the family. While there, he created some religious works; notably at the Charterhouse of Aula Dei.

He was expelled in 1759, after conflicts with his instructors, so he returned to Zaragoza with Ramón, who became his first student. Shortly after his return, he married Sebastiana Merklein, his former teacher's daughter. The marriage was intended as an introduction to society, and commissions soon followed.

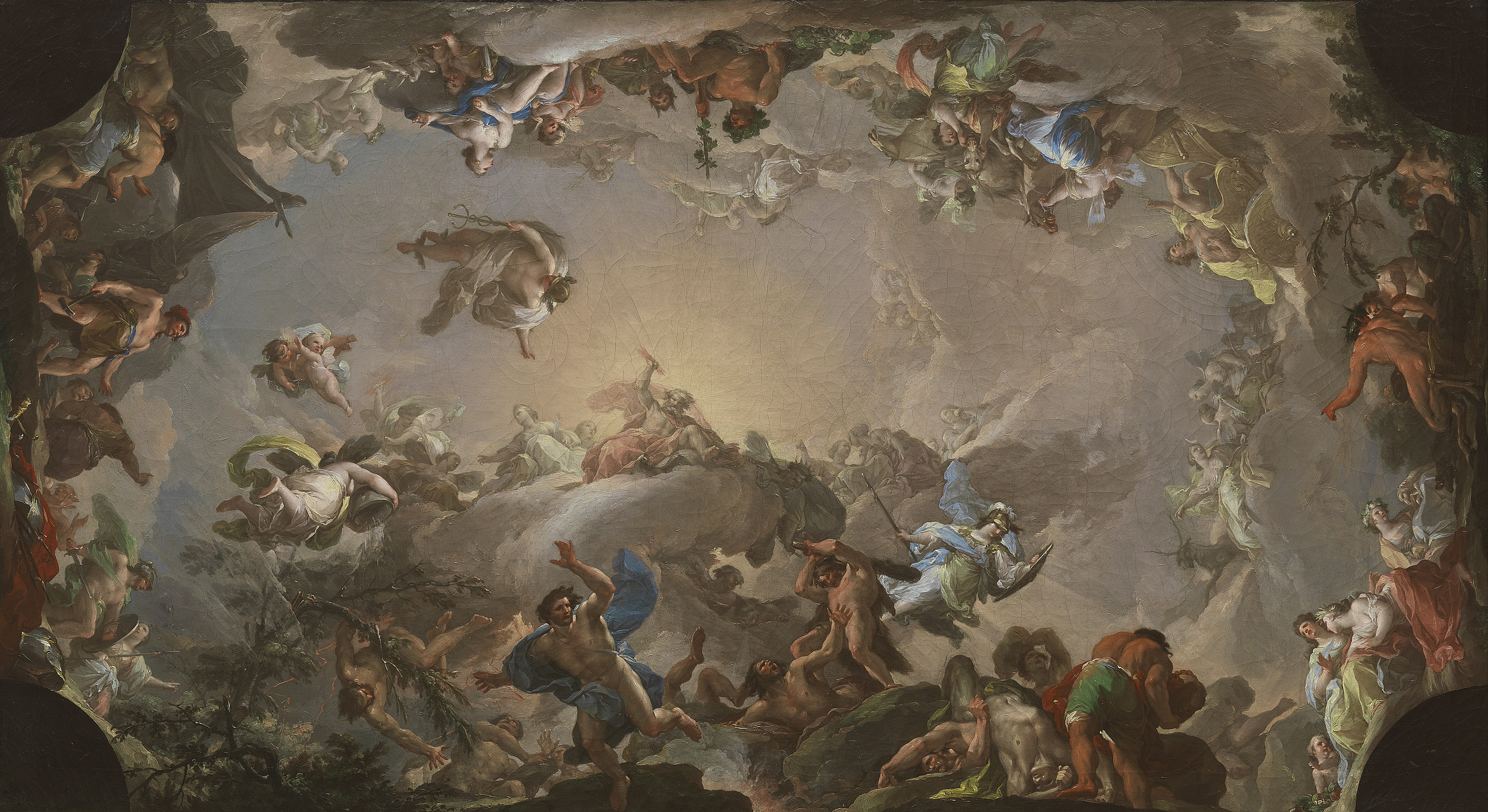
Sketch for Olympus: Battle of the Titans (1764)

In 1763, he was recalled to Madrid by Anton Raphael Mengs, to help decorate the Royal Palace. That same year, was given a position at the Royal Tapestry Factory by King Charles III. There, together with Ramón, he created designs and "cartones" (cartoons). He also re-enrolled at the Academia. In 1766, he received a scholarship to study in Italy. In addition to his tapestry work, he executed numerous decorative paintings at various palaces and churches. In later years, one of his colleagues was Francisco Goya, who had married his sister, Josefa Bayeu.

He was named a professor and Lieutenant-Director of the Academia in 1765, and was appointed a court painter in 1767. After several applications, he became Director of Painting at the Academia in 1788. The death of his brother Ramón, to whom he had been very close, caused his already poor health to deteriorate even further. He was finally named Director of the Academia in 1795, shortly before his death from what contemporaries describe as an "agonizing disease"; possibly the same lead poisoning that had afflicted Ramón.

== Sources ==
- Morales y Marín, J.L., Francisco Bayeu, vida y obra, Zaragoza, Moncayo, 1995. ISBN 84-7675-021-8
- El arte de los Bayeu, Expo 92 (Sevilla). Pabellón de Aragón, 1991. ISBN 84-404-9266-9
- Los Bayeu, Caja de Ahorros y Monte de Piedad de Zaragoza, Aragón y Rioja (Ibercaja, Obra Social y Cultural), 1979. ISBN 84-500-3272-5
- Sambricio, V. De, Francisco Bayeu, Consejo Superior de Investigaciones Científicas, 1956. ISBN 84-00-00566-X
- Francisco Bayeu in the Enciclopedia en Línea @ the Museo del Prado.
