= Durruti Column =

Anarchist military unit in the Spanish civil war

- Columna Durruti
- Active: 24 July 1936–28 April 1937
- Country: Spanish Republic
- Allegiance: CNT-FAI
- Branch: Confederal militias
- Type: Militia column
- Size: 6,000
- Part of: Regional Defense Council of Aragon; Madrid Defense Council
- Headquarters: Burcharaloz
- Patron: Buenaventura Durruti
- Colours: Red; Black
- March: A Las Barricadas
- Engagements: Spanish Civil War: Aragon front; Battle of Perdiguera; Siege of Madrid; Battle of Ciudad Universitaria

Commanders
- Commander-in-chief: Buenaventura Durruti (until November 1936); Ricardo Sanz (from November 1936)
- Military advisors: Enric Pérez Farràs; José Manzana
- Commander of the International Group: Louis Berthomieu (until October 1936); Mohamed Saïl (October–November 1936
- Administrator: Émilienne Morin

The Durruti Column (Spanish: Columna Durruti) was an anarchist militia column, led by Buenaventura Durruti, which fought on the side of the Spanish Republic during the Spanish Civil War. It was the first militia column established in Revolutionary Catalonia after the defeat of the July 1936 military uprising in Barcelona. It was dispatched to the Aragon front, with the aim of capturing the Aragonese capital of Zaragoza from the Nationalists. The Column captured several towns in the east of Zaragoza province, but was halted 20 kilometers outside the city and forced to wait for reinforcements.

The frontline through the province remained stagnant throughout August, while the Column involved itself in the organisation of agricultural collectives and mapped out a strategy to take Zaragoza. In September, the militia column participated in an offensive in the province of Huesca, forcing the Nationalist forces there to withdraw to the provincial capital. In October, the Nationalists launched a counteroffensive in Zaragoza province, but the Durruti Column was able to defend its positions at Osera. Amid skirmishes on the front, the column's International Group briefly captured Perdiguera from the Nationalists, but the town was quickly taken back and most of the militiamen were killed. The Column established the Regional Defense Council of Aragon, with which it aimed to coordinate the various Republican militias and eventually establish a unified command structure. However, the Catalan and Spanish national governments sought to militarise the militias and bring them under state control. The Durruti Column ignored the government's decree on militarisation and continued to operate as an independent unit.

With the outbreak of the siege of Madrid in November 1936, part of the Durruti Column was transferred to defend the Spanish capital. After arriving there, the Column took part in the Battle of Ciudad Universitaria, where it fought for days without relief. Durruti himself was shot and killed during the fighting. Many of the Durruti Column's members believed he had been assassinated, either by a Nationalist fifth column or their own political rivals within the Republican faction; Stalinist historiography has alleged that insubordinate members of the Column itself had assassinated Durruti. Ricardo Sanz replaced Durruti at the head of the Column, and after the Nationalists abandoned their Madrid offensive, the Column returned to Aragon. By mid-1937, it was reorganised into 26th Division of the Spanish Republican Army, which continued fighting until the very end of the war.

== Zaragoza Offensive (July 1936) ==
=== Establishment ===
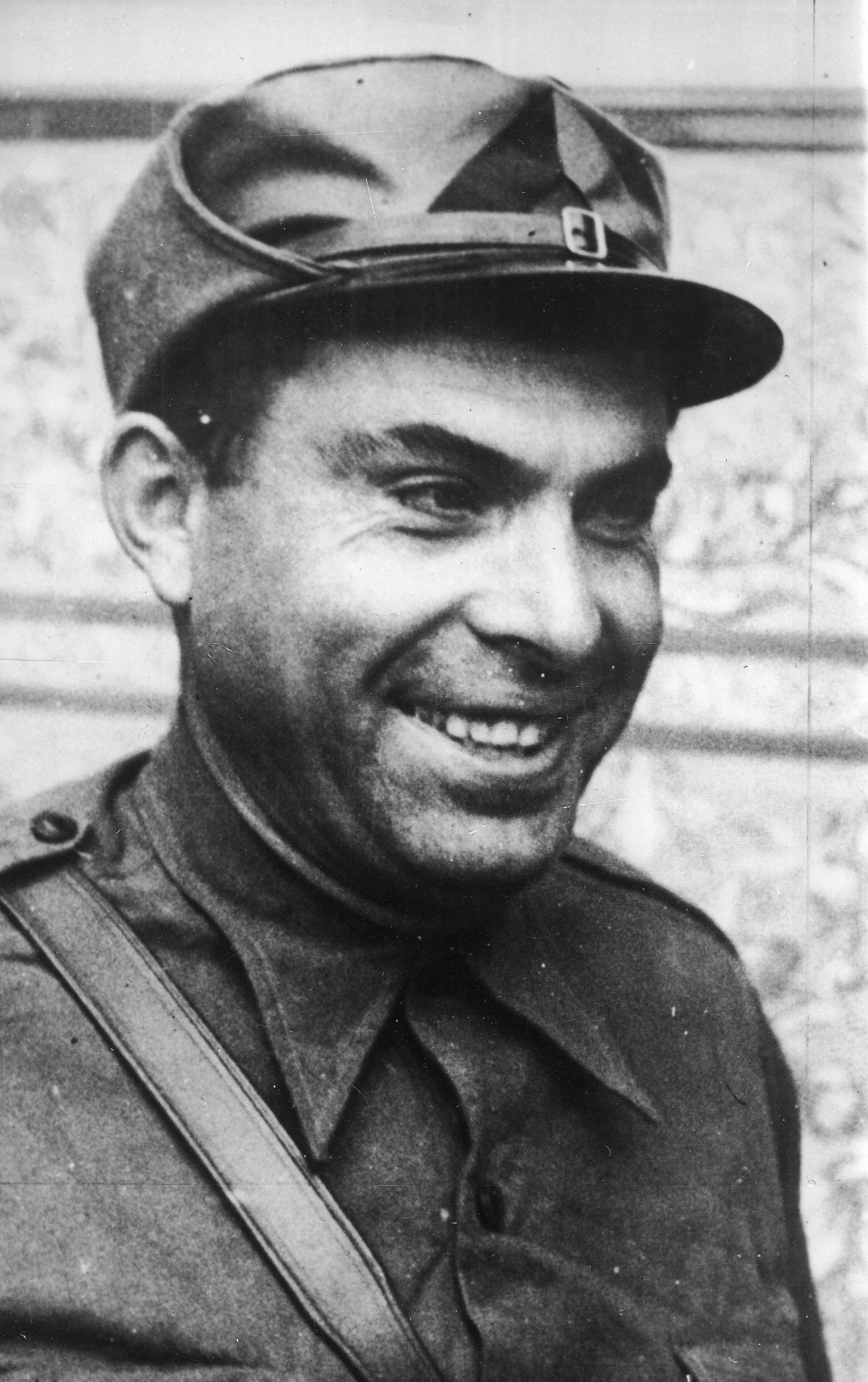
Buenaventura Durruti, commander of the Durruti Column

Following the victory of the anarchist militias over the July 1936 military uprising in Barcelona, the various political parties and trade unions of the Republican faction came together to establish the Central Committee of Antifascist Militias of Catalonia (CCMA), which resolved to establish militia columns to fight against the Nationalists in Aragon. The anarchists of the National Confederation of Labour (CNT) and the Iberian Anarchist Federation (FAI) took over the barracks in Pedralbes, Sant Andreu and the port of Barcelona, which they respectively renamed after Mikhail Bakunin, Fermin Salvochea and Spartacus, and began organising their own militias.

On 23 July 1936, CCMA member Joan Garcia Oliver gave a radio address to Aragonese workers, calling on them to rise up against fascism, with the promise that he and Buenaventura Durruti would soon lead an expeditionary column to join them in Aragon. The announcement received widespread support in Barcelona, where thousands of workers volunteered to serve in the militia, and received basic military training from local revolutionary committees. So many people volunteered that they had to be selected in order to make sure the column would be fully armed.

President Lluís Companys had insisted that the column be commanded by professional military officers, in order to command obedience and prevent it from maintaining an anarchic structure. But the militia column was instead established through a grassroots, self-organised mobilisation, without any hierarchy or chain of command, in which each military unit was coordinated by committees of elected representatives. The column's first military advisor, Enric Pérez Farràs, opposed this form of military organisation, as he believed it would not be feasible during combat. Durruti later replaced him with José Manzana, a non-commissioned officer who had a better understanding of the militia's anti-authoritarianism. Manzana and the schoolteacher Francisco Carreño were tasked with providing the column with ammunition, artillery and a field hospital. Durruti appointed Carreño as head of the Column's War Committee.

=== Departure ===
While the Durruti Column was being established in Barcelona, the Aragonese capital of Zaragoza had fallen under the control of the Nationalist 5th Division, commanded by General Miguel Cabanellas. This division consisted of: two infantry brigades, commanded by Eliseo Álvarez-Arenas and Gregorio Benito Terraza; and an artillery brigade, commanded by Eduardo Martín González, among other units. The city's 30,000 trade unionists had proclaimed a general strike and attempted to beat back the military uprising, but by 22 July, they were defeated. Huesca and Teruel were also taken by the Nationalists, leaving only Barbastro under the control of loyalist troops led by Colonel José Villalba Rubio.

At 08:00, on 24 July 1936, Durruti spoke over the radio to the workers of Barcelona, asking for them to provide the Column with food before they departed on their expedition. Although food distribution was usually handled by neighbourhood committees and the CNT food workers' union, Durruti hoped that such a direct appeal would help demonstrate the city's commitment to the war effort and workers' dedication to collective responsibility. At 10:00, crowds gathered on the Passeig de Gràcia to witness the departure of the Column. Durruti's biographer Abel Paz estimated that the Column initially consisted of 2,000 militiamen, although Diego Abad de Santillán put the number at 3,000, Joan Garcia Oliver put it at as many 5,000 and Soviet journalist Mikhail Koltsov put it as few as 1,200. The militiamen were drawn from every faction of left-wing politics. Abad de Santillán later said that, despite initial estimates predicting the Column would grow to 12,000 men before attacking Zaragoza, it never grew to the size they had hoped for. According to Belgian volunteer Louis Mercier, most of the militiamen had no military experience; the most experienced commanders had not fought in battle since the Rif War. Durruti had sought to recruit experienced soldiers from the infantry barracks, but they were ultimately not integrated into the Column.

At midday, the militiamen set off in a caravan of trucks, buses and cars. They were bid farewell with cheers, saluted with raised fists and sung the lyrics of the anarchist anthem A Las Barricadas!. At the head of the caravan was a truck, from which the anarchist José Hellín waved a red and black flag; behind it were centuries of metalworkers, miners from Alt Llobregat, sailors and textile workers. Between two of the buses, Durruti and Pérez Farràs rode together in a Hispano-Suiza car. The Durruti Column stopped at several villages along the way, directing the local inhabitants to form collectives, occupy agricultural land and organise themselves without bosses. The Column sometimes established the collectives by force, as they were anxious to bring in the harvest and feed industrial workers in the cities. This caused some resentment from the local Aragonese peasants, who feared the Catalan industrial workers who predominated the Column were following the model of collectivisation in the Soviet Union. Commenting on the coercive character of the collectivisation process in the areas they occupied, the Column's newspaper El Frente wrote that "it is a natural law that armies live off of the land they have conquered".

=== First clashes ===
When the Durruti Column arrived at the Aragonese town of Caspe, they found it in the middle of a battle between the Civil Guards under the command of Captain Negrete and anarchist militiamen led by the Subirats brothers. The Durruti Column helped to capture the town from the rebels, leading to more militiamen joining the column. They passed through several more villages over the following days, before arriving in Burcharaloz on 27 July and establishing their headquarters there. A CNT newspaper declared that the Durruti Column had brought a "fresh impulse to the revolutionary atmosphere" already present in the town, where peasants were already carrying out radical changes. On 28 July, the Column set off along the Ebro river towards Zaragoza. Shortly after leaving Burcharaloz, they came under aerial bombardment, killing a dozen men and wounding 20 more, including the column's artillery commander. During the bombardment, a number of militiamen panicked and attempted to flee, but they were stopped and held in place by others, preventing the momentary panic from escalating into a general retreat. Durruti led the column back to Burcharaloz, where he hoped to carry out reconnaissance on enemy positions so that they could prevent another ambush. Pérez Farràs took the opportunity to push for the restructuring of the Column, but Durruti pushed back against this, insisting that the men who had fled earlier could be turned into brave fighters if they were treated properly. In a speech to the Column, Durruti reproached them for fleeing from the planes and reminded them why they were fighting. When he requested that anybody who did not want to continue fighting give up their rifle, none did.

Unlike other militia columns, the Durruti Column focused on capturing larger towns rather than securing larger, more rural areas. They soon captured the towns of Pina and Osera d'Ebro. In Pina, the Column established a defence committee, seized Nationalist-owned property and destroyed the local property register. There the Aragonese militiaman Adolfo Ballano organised a trade union, which grew to 600 members by September, and established a cultural centre and a revolutionary committee. The Column was halted by enemy lines roughly 20 kilometers outside of Zaragoza, where they then dug trenches and set up machine gun posts. The CCMA then ordered them to remain in their positions and stabilise the front, while waiting for reinforcements from Antonio Ortiz's South Ebro Column. The Communist Party of Spain (PCE) criticised the Durruti Column for failing to capture Zaragoza, claiming that the militiamen had insisted on working an eight-hour day rather than pushing on. Historian Robert J. Alexander disregarded this narrative, instead pinning the failure to capture Zaragoza on Durruti's inexperience as a military commander and the time the Nationalists had to build up their defensive lines outside the city. Military historian Antony Beevor argued that the spontaneous organisation of the militias had resulted in their dispersal into strategically unimportant areas, and that the militia columns would have been more effective had they concentrated their strength on a few large objectives.

The Durruti Column obtained information from militiamen who had infiltrated Zaragoza, informing them that Germán Gil y Yuste had taken over command of the 5th Division and that a number of officers had received training from Fascist Italy. The city's Nationalist garrison had also been reinforced by a Carlist detachment from Iruña. Some Aragonese militiamen, including Josep Alberola, argued that the Durruti Column should immediately continue their offensive against Zaragoza and proposed they flank the city by first capturing Calatayú. But all the military advisors agreed that they should wait for reinforcements before an offensive against Zaragoza. After consulting with José Villalba, Durruti also accepted the proposal to halt their offensive. Durruti would later consider this to have been an error, although he still thought his decision was justified as a solo operation against the city could have destroyed the column. While awaiting reinforcements from Catalonia, the Durruti Column firmly established itself in the Monegros comarca. It established a 78-kilometer long defense line through the province of Zaragoza, from Leciñena in the north to Velilla in the south. Surprise attacks by the Column's guerrilla units allowed them to slowly make advances. In areas occupied by the Column, peasant collectives were established and abolished money and private property. A scarcity of weapons resulted in militiamen taking shifts between the trenches and helping out on peasant collectives, which resulted in fraternal relations building between the militiamen and the local peasants.

== Stalemate (August 1936) ==
Frontlines at the outbreak of the Spanish Civil War

In early August 1936, the front line was largely stagnant, although surprise attacks behind enemy lines resulted in the taking of prisoners of war, the demolition of Nationalist positions and the theft of weapons and ammunition. Reports on enemy movements from the Column's guerrilla detachments also allowed them to reinforce their line of defense. The Column was joined on its right by the Maurin Column, a militia of the Workers' Party of Marxist Unification (POUM), and to its north by the Karl Marx Column, which was organised by the Unified Socialist Party of Catalonia (PSUC). The Durruti Column gained a reputation for attacking churches and killing priests. When Austrian journalist Franz Borkenau arrived at the front in mid-August, he discovered that the Durruti Column had summarily executed 38 people in Fraga, including the local priest and some of the town's richer residents. Simone Weil also reported that the Durruti Column executed a young Falangist prisoner from Pina de Ebro, after Durruti himself had unsuccessfully attempted to persuade him to change his political beliefs.

Meanwhile, Durruti became more actively engaged in the agrarian collectivisation efforts and encouraged peasants to form a federation of agricultural collectives. At Durruti's urging, the Column's militiamen took part in the wheat harvest, which he thought would build solidarity between the two groups and provide an opportunity to educate each other on libertarian communism. The Committee distributed a leaflet about the collectives' activities among the militiamen, generating a positive response, with activists of the Libertarian Youth volunteering to take part in the harvest as "soldier-producers". This process culminated in the establishment of the Aragón Federation of Collectives. Durruti also became stricter in reprimanding militiamen for infractions, expelling militiamen from the Column for leaving their posts to go drinking and dismissing peasants who had left the collectives to join the Column.

After only two weeks of fighting, the Durruti Column had used up most of its ammunition reserves and had to repair or scrap their old out-of-date rifles. The artillery brigade was also forced to conserve its shells and the Spanish Republican Air Force rarely provided close air support, while aerial bombardments by the German and Italian Air Forces were a regular occurrence. Attempts by the South Ebro Column and the Del Barrio Column to respectively capture the strategically important towns of Belchite and the Alcubierre were also thwarted by the Nationalists, who received a constant stream of reinforcements and resupply from Zaragoza. At this time, the Durruti Column could not engage in any offensive operations larger than small skirmishes. Nor could it withdraw from its positions, as the Nationalists taking Monegros would cut the lines of communication with the militia columns in the provinces of Huesca and Teruel, which would provide the Nationalists with an open way towards Lleida. While the Durruti Column continued to hold its positions and reinforce strategic points along the front line, Durruti returned to Barcelona to coordinate a renewed offensive with the CCMA.

Durruti discussed the situation with CCMA member Joan Garcia Oliver, bringing up the planned attack on Zaragoza, the supply shortage and how they would restructure the Aragon War Committee. But Garcia Oliver informed him that the Zaragoza offensive was going to be postponed, in part because the South Ebro and Del Barrio Columns had failed to achieve their objectives, but also because Captain Alberto Bayo was already planning the Mallorca landings, intending to provoke a confrontation between the British and Italians. Durruti argued that the French and British would prefer to uphold the appeasement of the Italians, rather than confront them over Mallorca. He attempted to assert the necessity of quickly taking Zaragoza, in order to prevent the Nationalists from fortifying their positions and then to link up with Republican forces in the north of Spain, so that a combined offensive could be carried out against the Nationalists in Andalusia. This ignited a debate within the Catalan CNT over whether to maintain their collaboration with Republican parties, with a decision being made to continue collaborating rather than provoke internal conflict within the anti-fascist ranks. Durruti returned to Burcharaloz, seeking to reinforce and strengthen the militia columns, with the aim of advancing the revolution.

By this time, the Column had captured Aguilar, Farlet, Monegriello and Osera, while Pina was being besieged. From their observation point, they were able to see Zaragoza, but could not take any offensive operations against it due to their lack of ammunition. Instead, they relied more on guerrilla operations behind enemy lines, carrying out surprise attacks within the Nationalists' own trenches and taking many soldiers as prisoner, or looting enemy supplies and even cattle raiding. When Durruti returned, the Aragón War Committee began planning an offensive in the province of Huesca. They requested that the Durruti Column, which was under less enemy pressure than other militia columns, transfer itself there. Durruti believed that, once their positions in Huesca and Teruel were reinforced, they could then carry out their offensive against Zaragoza.

== Huesca Offensive (September 1936) ==
By mid-August 1936, the Republican militias had launched an offensive in Huesca province. The campaign was led by José Villalba and his 3,000-strong militia column, which caused operational difficulties within the Republican ranks; while most of the militias were united in a War Committee in Sarinyena, Villalba insisted on maintaining his own independent War Committee in Balbastro, which prevented any unitary coordination from taking place. The Durruti Column carried out an attack on Fuents d'Ebro, where French and Argentine journalists witnessed them successfully capturing the town. José Mira then led his grouping to aid in the capture of Sietemo, which they occupied after three days of battle. The capture of this strategically important town allowed the Republicans to cut off water to Huesca city and opened the way to eventually capturing the city. The Durruti Column then left the town under the control of Villalba's militia, who quickly abandoned the town after a Nationalist counterattack. On 4 September 1936, the Republicans again attempted to capture Sietemo, but the Nationalists had reinforced their positions with another infantry company, a Falangist detachment and many more Civil Guards, and placed 6 machine guns and an artillery battery on the town's high ground.

Mira was again dispatched to aid Villalba's offensive against Sietemo, where they came under constant bombardment from German airplanes that had been sent from Garrapiniellos. After three days, the Republican militias captured the outskirts of the town and began house-to-house fighting against the Nationalists. The Durruti Column then pushed the Nationalists back to the town church, which they took following close-quarters combat, and the castle of the County of Aranda, before finally forcing the Nationalists to evacuate the town on 12 September. With Sietemo captured, the Durruti Column seized 2 artillery cannons, 4 mortar cannons, 8 machine guns and 300 rifles; they also took 150 Nationalists as prisoners of war. The Nationalists retreated down the Estrecho Quinto road, and dug in behind the Flumen river. Republican reconnaissance found that the Nationalist trenches in Huesca stretched from Loporzano to Tierz, where they had fortified their positions with artillery, machine guns, anti-aircraft cannons and an infantry battalion. The offensive immediately continued on from Sietemo. From 15 to 18 September, the Republican militias attempted to flank the Nationalist lines, but faced heavy resistance. On 30 September, the Durruti Column captured Loporzano; the Republican forces also captured Forniellos and placed Tierz under siege. The Nationalists then withdrew to Huesca city, leaving the Republican way forward undefended. Villalba's militia captured many prisoners of war, as well as 12 machine guns, 3 artillery cannons, 2 anti-aircraft cannons and several vehicles. From the Castle of Montearagón, the Durruti Column captured 6 artillery cannons, 12 mortar cannons and 1,000 rifles.

After the Republican victory on the Huesca front, Durruti gave a speech calling for all weapons still being held in the rearguard to be sent to the frontlines. This caused fierce debates to break out between the Unified Socialist Party of Catalonia (PSUC) and the Barcelona revolutionary committees, as the former denounced the latter for continuing to hold on to their weapons. The debate came to a head when workers discovered the PSUC had themselves stockpiled weapons, taken from the Karl Marx Barracks, in their offices in Sabadell. Trade unions dispatched a delegation to Burcharaloz to report the issue to the Durruti Column, which demanded that the CCMA recover the weapons from the PSUC. Diego Abad de Santillán ordered the Karl Marx Barracks to hand the weapons over, telling them that they risked an armed response if they failed to do so; the 8 machine guns which the PSUC had stockpiled in Sabadell were quickly given up.

== Further battles and reorganisation (October 1936) ==
=== Battle of Osera ===
While the Republicans attempted to reorganise their forces on the front lines, Nationalist troops attacked the Durruti Column's positions on the front line between Perdiguera and Lecinyena. The offensive was carried out by 4,500 Nationalist soldiers, led by Gustavo Urrutia, and consisted of the 19th infantry battalion, 3 companies of armoured cars, 4 companies of machine gunners, a Carlist tercio, 5 companies of the Falange Española de las JONS, 2 aerial squadrons and 2 artillery batteries. On 4 October, a Nationalist column of mobile infantry attacked the Durruti Column's positions north of Osera and Villafranca d'Ebro, in an attempt to break through their lines and take Osera. The Durruti Column came under heavy machine gun fire and aerial bombardment, but they put up a strong resistance and eventually managed to repel the Nationalist forces.

On 5 October, the Nationalists attempted another offensive: the Nationalist right flank, which included cavalry detachments, again moved down the road towards Osera; the left flank, including artillery and tanks, advanced down the road towards Farlet. Facing overwhelming numbers, the relatively small Durruti Column was forced to retreat slightly. To counter attack, they put together an artillery battery and received reinforcements and ammunition from other sectors, leaving militiamen in other parts of the front line with only 10 bullets each. The Nationalists came within a kilometer of Farlet and their cavalry attempted to encircle the town, but they came under heavy artillery fire from the Durruti Column's battery. The Nationalists hastily retreated, pursued along the way by the Durruti Column's armoured cars. The Nationalists attempted to regroup and launch a counterattack, but the Durruti Column called in an aerial bombardment, forcing them to withdraw. The Durruti Column successfully routed the enemy forces, killing many, while many more abandoned their weapons and fled. The Column captured many prisoners of war, largely from the ranks of the Falangists and Carlists, and a number of Nationalists even defected to their side. By the end of the day, the Durruti Column had regained control of the area and drove the Nationalists back 15 kilometers towards Perdiguera.

=== Towards a unified command structure ===
While fighting on the front was still taking place, on 6 October 1936, the Durruti Column participated in a regional assembly of the CNT, together with delegates from village collectives and other confederal militia columns. The Aragonese regional secretary of the CNT announced a proposal to establish a National Defense Council, consisting of the CNT and UGT, which would take over political and economic administration on the local, provincial, regional and national levels. Although the UGT had rejected the proposal, the CNT pressed forward to create a Regional Defense Council of Aragon, which it considered necessary to reduce the influence of counterrevolutionary forces behind the republican lines. Representing the Column, Durruti supported the establishment of such a council, hoping it would unify their efforts on the front line and constitute a step towards the eventual creation of a National Defense Council to coordinate the entire Republican war effort.

The meeting also resolved to establish a single War Committee, which would direct the military effort on the front line. A representative of the Durruti Column was delegated to serve on the Committee, together with a representative of the Ortiz Column, three representatives from the Huesca front and two representatives from the Regional Defense Council. In establishing the War Committee, the Regional Defense Council sought to resolve the problems caused by the conflicting tendencies represented by the various militia columns and to clearly demarcate the separation between the front line columns and the rearguard. At this time, CNT columns and the libertarian collectives were coming into conflict with the forces of the PSUC, which extended protection to private property owners and attempted to dissolve the libertarian collectives by force of arms. In Peñalba, where a collective had been established in August to feed the Durruti Column, the majority of the population decided to reclaim their private property, with communist backing; only a third of the town's population continued to maintain the collective. These internal conflicts prevented the militia columns from organising an offensive on Huesca. Representatives of the various columns gathered together in Sarinyena, where the new War Committee was established, despite PSUC objections.

By this time, Felipe Díaz Sandino had been appointed as the Catalan Minister of Defense by the reorganised Catalan government. He sought to carry out the militarisation of the confederal militias, but recognised he had to do so cautiously in order to not cause open conflict with them. On 8 October, while the Durruti Column was still under Nationalist fire, Díaz Sandino called for all militia columns to meet in Sarinyena to discuss the formation of a general staff. The meeting was attended by representatives of both the PSUC and CNT columns, forcing them to directly confront the dispute between them. Díaz Sandino opened the meeting by saying the circumstances of the war required them to militarise the militias and unify their leadership into a general staff, which would be composed of the leaders of the various columns and be air force commander Alfonso de los Reyes González. José del Barrio of the PSUC objected to the proposal due to the ongoing political conflict between the PSUC and CNT, but Díaz Sandino repeated his appeal for unity as he believed it was the only way to beat back the Nationalists. Díaz Sandino and Garcia Oliver underlined that Reyes was the only neutral option to lead their combined military efforts; the anarchist delegates accepted this, but del Barrio continued to object to the formation of a unified command.

=== Battle of Perdiguera ===
With the Republicans preoccupied at the Burcharaloz assembly and Sarinyena military conference, on 8 October, the Nationalists again advanced towards Farlet, stopping less than 3 kilometers outside the town. On 10 October, Nationalist reinforcements arrived at Perdiguera, Quinto, Villanueva and Zuera; while the troops at Perdiguera took the high ground between it and Lecinyena, others captured the heights of the Sierra d'Alcubierre. After days of heavy fighting, the Nationalists captured Lecinyena and killed many of its Republican defenders.

With the Republican supply lines disrupted by the capture of Licenyena, on 12 October, the Nationalists attacked POUM-held positions north of the Sierra d'Alcubierre. The Durruti Column provided reinforcements and contained the Nationalists at Alcubierre, before mustering their forces for a counterattack against Licenyena. On 14 October, the Durruti Column advanced down the road from Villamayor towards the enemy lines at Perdiguera and Lecinyena. The International Group, which consisted of 40 men led by Louis Berthomieu, broke off from the rest of the Column and went towards Perdiguera. There they attacked the Nationalists defenses with hand grenades, entered the town and finally defeated the local garrison on 16 October.

The Nationalists were quickly reinforced by two battalions from Zaragoza, which besieged Perdiguera. The International Group were cornered in a number of the town's houses, outnumbered 20-to-1, with their exits blocked by cavalry. Two members, Charles Ridel and Charles Carpentier, managed to slip through the enemy lines and reunite with the rest of the Durruti Column. The other 38 stayed behind in the town and fought to their deaths. The Durruti Column attempted to counterattack and aid the besieged International Group, but a surprise attack by another detachment of Nationalists prevented them from doing so. When the Nationalists retook Perdiguera, they executed three foreign nurses from the Red Cross. By the end of the battle, the Durruti Column had reestablished a continuous front as far north as Mont Escuro, the highest peak of the Sierra d'Alcubierre, where they pushed out the Nationalists and reestablished contact with the POUM militia. One Belgian member of the Column, Mathieu Corman, reported that "the territory gained didn't compensate for the Column's losses. Berthomieu alone was worth more than all that."

=== Militarisation decree ===
After the battle, the Durruti Column was informed that the Madrid government had issued a decree to militarise the militia columns and reestablish a traditional military hierarchy in the Republican ranks. Some militiamen requested leave, so that they would not have to submit to government edicts. The militarisation decree drew vocal criticism from the confederal militias, who continued to uphold the post-revolutionary form of militia organisation. The Durruti Column ultimately chose to feign ignorance of the decree, while implementing some of its aspects that they agreed with, such as conscription and a single command structure.

While the reorganisation took place, the Column received a visit from a CNT delegation, which requested one of its members be sent to Moscow for an upcoming anniversary celebration of the October Revolution. The Column's War Committee decided to send Francisco Carreño to Moscow as its representative. Durruti drafted a greeting to Russian workers, but Carreño was not able to read the statement publicly in Moscow. The Column was then visited by Horacio Prieto, the General Secretary of the CNT, who requested that they be transferred from the Aragon front to Castile. Speaking on behalf of the Column, Durruti refused.

== Madrid front (November 1936) ==
=== Transfer to Madrid ===
Frontlines of the Spanish Civil War in November 1936

As the Nationalists closed in around Madrid in early November, beginning the siege of Madrid, the Catalan ministry of defence called a crisis meeting of all the Catalan militia columns to decide which would be transferred to defend the Spanish capital. Francisco Largo Caballero's government, which had recently integrated members of the CNT into its cabinet, fled the capital on 6 November. José Miaja was left in command of the city's defence, with Vicente Rojo as his chief of staff, while the people of the city rallied to defend their neighbourhoods from the advancing Nationalists. On 8 November, the battle of Madrid began with an offensive led by Juan Yagüe and José Enrique Varela, who drove their forces towards the Casa de Campo, while carrying out a diversionary movement towards the bridges of Segovia and Toledo over the Manzanares river. To preempt the arrival of the anarchist militia columns to the capital, the PSUC quickly dispatched its own López Tienda Column to Madrid, despite having given it little military training and only a small amount of ammunition.

With Madrid under siege, on 9 November, the central section of the CNT dispatched David Antona to Burcharaloz to request the Durruti Column be transferred to the capital. The Republican government also sent Federica Montseny to secure an agreement for the Column's presence. With promises from Ovseenko that the Soviets would arm any reinforcements which were sent to Madrid, on 11 November, Diego Abad de Santillán called a meeting of the militia columns in Aragon. There they decided that Durruti would lead his Column to the Madrid front, for which they planned to recruit 12,000 militiamen. Durruti called up the Column's headquarters in Burcharaloz, and requested José Mira's 1st grouping, Liberto Ros' 8th grouping, and the international volunteers of the 44th, 48th and 52nd centuries (representing 1,400 militiamen in total), be prepared for transfer to the Madrid front. The Column's War Committee was reorganised under José Manzana, Antonio Mora, Ricardo Rionda and Miguel Yoldi. On 13 November, the militiamen bound for Madrid went to the port of Barcelona, unloaded boxes of weapon shipments from Mexico and loaded them onto train carriages. By the time they left Barcelona by train, they had not slept in 48 hours. They later discovered that the weapons - Winchester Model 1886 rifles - were fragile, often jammed and did not take ammunition of the Spanish caliber. That night, the train left Barcelona in the direction of Valencia. The following day, they were transferred onto buses and trucks, as the Nationalists had destroyed rail lines between Valencia and Madrid. Upon Durruti's arrival in Madrid, according to Soviet journalist Mikhail Koltsov, the Soviet officer Hadji-Umar Mamsurov was appointed as the Column's military advisor. Durruti's biographer Abel Paz disputes whether Mamsurov ever advised the Column. In interviews with Antonio Bonilla, José Mira, Antonio Mora, Ricardo Rionda, Liberto Ros, none of them supported the claim that Mamsurov had been the Column's military advisor.

Shortly before Durruti's arrival, Garcia Oliver proposed that Durruti replace José Miaja as the head of the Madrid Defense Council; according to Garcia Oliver, Largo Caballero accepted the proposal, but asked for secrecy until Durruti had ingratiated himself in Madrid. Durruti was also given command over the López Tienda Column, which he ordered to attack the Nationalists at the Casa de Campo. However, the Column's commanding officers refused to fight underneath an anarchist militiaman. On the morning of 15 November, Vicente Rojo ordered a counteroffensive along the Manzanres to push the Nationalists back over the Franceses Bridge, which would prevent them from entering Madrid. While two tanks and a Moroccan detachment were crossing the bridge, the Republicans blew it up with dynamite. However, during the operations, the untrained López-Tienda Column withdrew in a disorderly fashion, which allowed the Nationalists to break through their lines, enter the University City and occupy the Hospital Clínico San Carlos. The account of Mikhail Koltsov, who misidentified the López-Tienda Column as the Durruti Column, has led to confusion in the historical record. This version of events was taken up by historians such as Robert Garland Colodny, Pierre Broué and Hugh Thomas, who each in turn misidentified the López-Tienda Column as the Durruti Column.

=== Battle of Ciudad Universitaria ===
As the situation in Madrid became desperate, the Durruti Column finally arrived in Vallecas. According to Robert J. Alexander, 1,400 of the Column's militiamen had ultimately been transferred; Michael Alpert and Antony Beevor said Durruti had brought 3,000 men with him; and French historians Pierre Broué and Émile Temime put the number as high as 3,500. At 09:00 on 15 November, they crossed into Madrid. As they passed the Finnish Embassy, they were attacked by the Nationalists inside; the Column stormed the embassy and seized its arsenal of machine guns and grenades. They then stopped at a primary school on Calle de Hortaleza, where they were given accommodation. At 16:00, Federica Montseny arrived at their door and told them that the Nationalists had advanced to Avenida de los Rosales and requested they go there immediately to push them back. Shortly after Montseny left, Durruti arrived and told them that they had been assigned a new position. The Nationalists had captured part of the University City, so they went to the front at 02:00 on 16 November. When they arrived at the Cárcel Modelo, Durruti and Manzana told them which positions they would occupy. Some of them examined the terrain under cover of darkness, before returning and distributing ammunition and grenades to each militiaman. At the onset of the Battle of Ciudad Universitaria, all the Republican reserves were transferred to the area for a counterattack. The Durruti Column, along with the remnants of the López-Tienda Column and the 4th Mixed Brigade, held the frontline around the faculties of Medicine, Pharmacy and Dentistry.

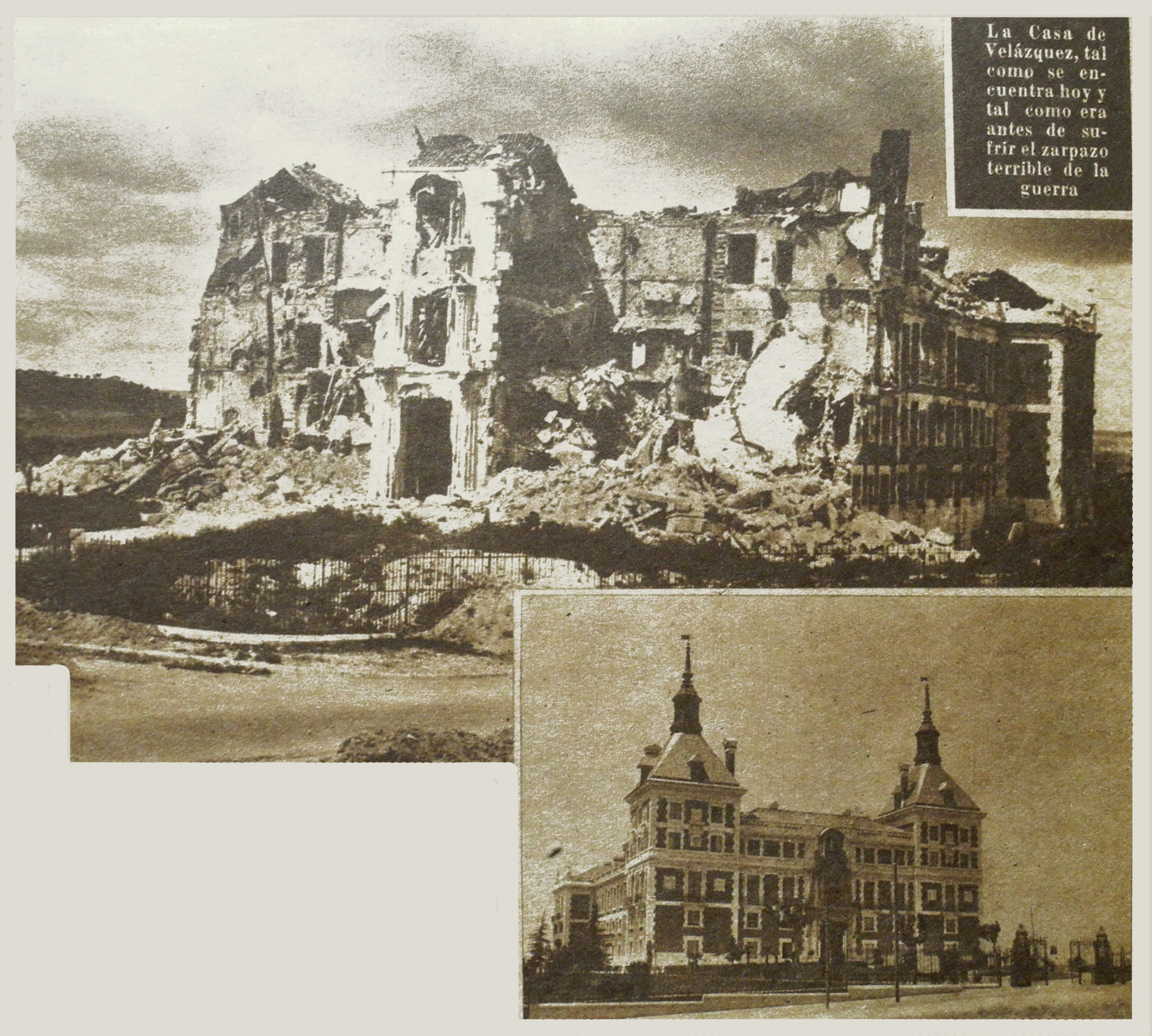
The Casa de Velázquez, before (below) and after (above) the civil war

Manfred Stern's XI International Brigade, which occupied the northern sector, ignored its orders to attack in the early morning. This allowed the forces of Carlos Asensio Cabanillas to advance and capture the Casa de Velázquez from the Dabrowski Battalion, which in turn left the Durruti Column exposed. The Column's right flank, led by Liberto Roig, advanced through the Parque del Oeste and occupied the Rubio Institute; its left flank, led by José Mira, was to occupy the Santa Cristina Asylum, the Hospital Clinic, the Casa de Velázquez and the Faculty of Philology, where they would reestablish contact with the XI Brigade. Following hours of fighting, including some close-quarters combat, by 07:00, the Column captured the Hospital Clinic and the asylum. At 09:00, the Nationalists counterattacked with artillery, tanks and aerial bombardments; some Nationalist planes were shot down and crashed on the Column's lines. Having already suffered heavy casualties, the Column was preoccupied with rescuing the wounded and failed to take the Casa de Velázquez. After hours of fighting, they finally received reinforcements from the Fifth Regiment at 11:00.

Well into the following night, they continued fighting to capture the Casa de Velázquez and the Faculty of Philology. At 23:00, the Column finally managed to link up with the XI Brigade. Together with the international volunteers, the Column managed to capture the Faculty of Philology, despite constant Nationalist attacks, by the time the sun rose on 17 November. The Durruti Column militiamen had not eaten or rested since the start of the battle. Although they had also been promised air and fire support, this never materialised, exacerbating the anarchists' distrust of the communist commanding officers. Heavy Nationalist bombardment followed later that day, accompanied by an attack led by Francisco Delgado Serrano against the Santa Cristina Asylum and the Hospital Clinic, where they clashed with the Durruti Column. Members of the Fifth Regiment attempted to desert the Hospital Clinic, but a group led by Miguel Yoldi prevented them from fleeing. At 16:00, the Durruti Column received reinforcements from the Rosal Column, which rapidly captured a number of surrounding buildings. Later that night, Yoldi and Cipriano Mera met Durruti at the Durruti Column's headquarters at the Sotomayor Palace on Calle de Miguel Ángel. There they assembled the leaders of each century, who reported that only 700 of the 1,700 militiamen who had joined the battle remained alive, and that they had not eaten or rested in 36 hours. That night was marked by continuous waves of bayonet charges from the Nationalists, who the Column met with machine gun fire.

The Durruti Column was one of the only military forces in the battle that did not receive relief in place, while the International Brigades regularly rotated out. Durruti attempted to seek replacements from Eduardo Val, the leader of the CNT's Madrid Defense Committee. Val was able to replace Yoldi, but Manzana insisted on fighting, despite being wounded. But Val was ultimately unable to replace most of Durruti's men, as most of the CNT's fighters were already engaged on other fronts. Liberto Roig then informed Durruti that José Mira had been wounded and that the Column was insisting on relief. Durruti responded that, under the circumstances, there was no possibility of relief, and they would have to continue enduring the battle. He also promised that he would replace Mira later that night.

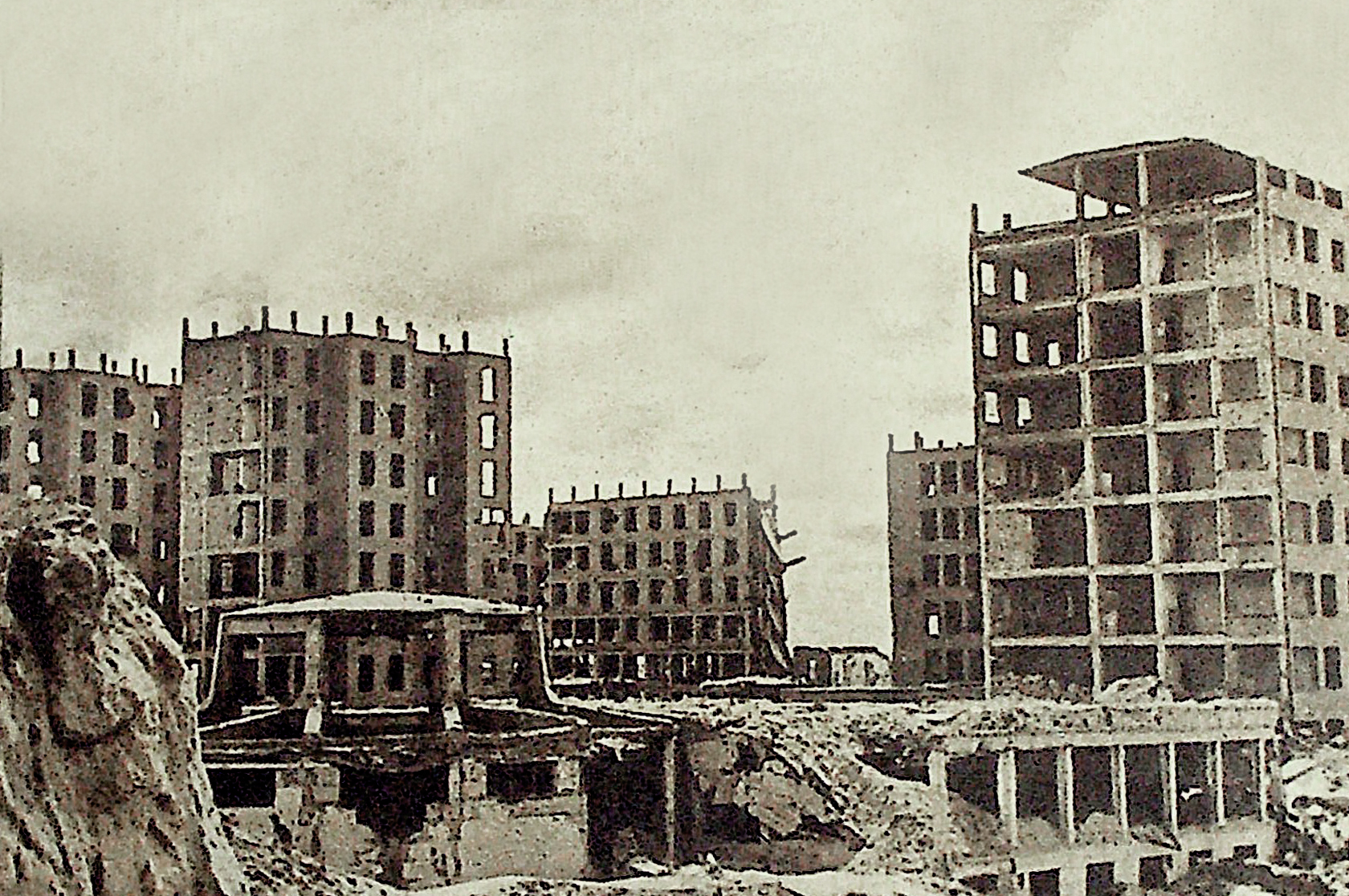
The ruins of the Hospital Clinic, after the civil war

Miaja and Rojo promised to replace the Durruti Column's wounded on 19 November, but requested that they continue to hold out until then and that they secure the area around the Hospital Clinic. They believed that the Nationalists had exhausted themselves attempting to take Madrid, and that if they could hold out another 24 hours, then the battle for Ciudad Universitaria would be won. When Durruti returned to the front, the Column held the front line from the Directorate-General of the Civil Guard to the Thermal Power Plant. At a meeting of the War Committee later that night, Cipriano Mera proposed that the confederal militias in Madrid be merged together under Durruti's sole command; this would have prevented the militarisation of the anarchist militias, but the rank-and-file would relinquish their democratic control over the command structure.

By 18 November, the Hospital Clinic had fallen under Nationalist control. To recapture it, the Durruti Column first took an adjacent block of houses on Avenida de Pablo Iglesias, which was 400 metres away from the Hospital. That day, a member of the Rosal Column pointed out that the Nationalists left the building each night and returned in the morning, and proposed they take it at night. At 04:00 on 19 November, the Durruti Column fired a volley at the Hospital Clinic, and when there was no return fire, a group of militiamen moved to occupy the building. The offensive against the Hospital Clinic began at 06:00, in heavy torrential rain. The Column was attacked by Nationalists on the lower floors, so they retreated to the building's upper floors and roofs. At 07:00, Durruti ordered the column to sweep the basement and ground floor before clearing out the rest of the building, but his message arrived too late, as the Nationalists on the ground floor had already trapped the Durruti Column above them.

=== Durruti's death ===
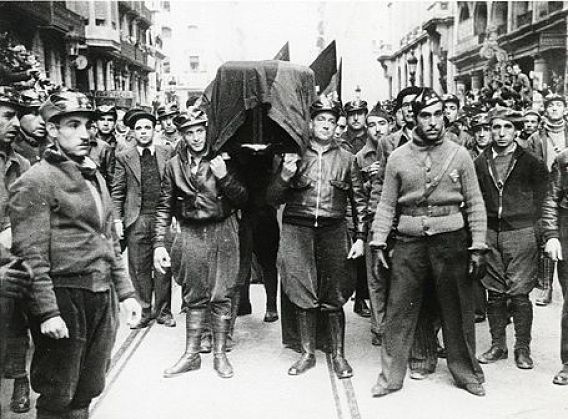
Militiamen carrying Durruti's coffin in Barcelona

In order to rescue the trapped militiamen, Durruti sent two companies from a reserve battalion to attack the Nationalists on the ground floor. Meanwhile, the Column had also sustained heavy casualties at the Palace of Moncloa and the Model Prison, forcing them to change locations. The two reserve companies withdrew from the Hospital Clinic only hours after they were deployed. At 12:30, Mira sent a message to Durruti, begging for relief, as the Column had suffered heavy casualties and had not slept or eaten in days. Durruti ordered them to remain in their posts until replacements arrived later that day. As the situation at the Hospital Clinic continued to deteriorate, Durruti decided to visit the front personally. There, at 14:30, he was shot and fatally wounded. He died in the Column's military hospital the following day. Inspired by their fallen leader, the Column continued to defend Madrid. Anarchist historiography attributes the Republican victory in the battle of Madrid to the Durruti Column.

Meanwhile, Mariano R. Vázquez, the new General Secretary of the CNT, began considering who to replace Durruti at the head of the Column. Among the names suggested were Gregorio Jover of the Ascaso Column, Antoni Ortiz of the South-Ebro Column and Ricardo Sanz, who commanded the Durruti Column in Aragon; Mera also suggested Garcia Oliver take over. They ultimately decided to send Sanz to Madrid to take over the Column, and transferred Manzana back to the Aragon front to lead its forces there. Upon Sanz's arrival at the Durruti Column's barracks, he found the surviving militiamen demoralised by the loss of their commander. By this time, rumours were spreading within the Column that Durruti had been assassinated by the communists. The militiamen told Sanz that they believed Durruti had been killed by "our enemies within the Republic" and warned him that he might also be in danger. Other members of the Durruti Column, including Belgian volunteer Mathieu Corman, believed Durruti had been assassinated by fifth columnists embedded in Madrid.

On the other hand, French communist Pierre Rosli of the XI International Brigade claimed that it had been members of the Durruti Column who had killed Durruti, shooting him in the back at the Model Prison on 21 November. Soviet journalist Roman Karmen believed that the only people capable of killing Durruti were the "adventurist members" of his own Column. French historians Pierre Broué and Émile Temime later repeated this version of events, speculating that one of the Column's militiamen had resented Durruti's strict discipline. Spanish historian Abel Paz took offense to the Stalinist narrative, describing it as "the greatest possible affront" to the Columnists who had followed Durruti to Madrid and died in the fighting there. Paz considered it unthinkable that a militiaman of the Durruti Column could have killed Durruti, "unless the assassin was mentally unstable and it was an isolated act". He alternatively speculated that, if the assassin had come from the Durruti Column, it could have been one of the Carabineros which the Column had recruited upon its arrival in Madrid.

== Later activities ==
=== Remnants in Madrid ===
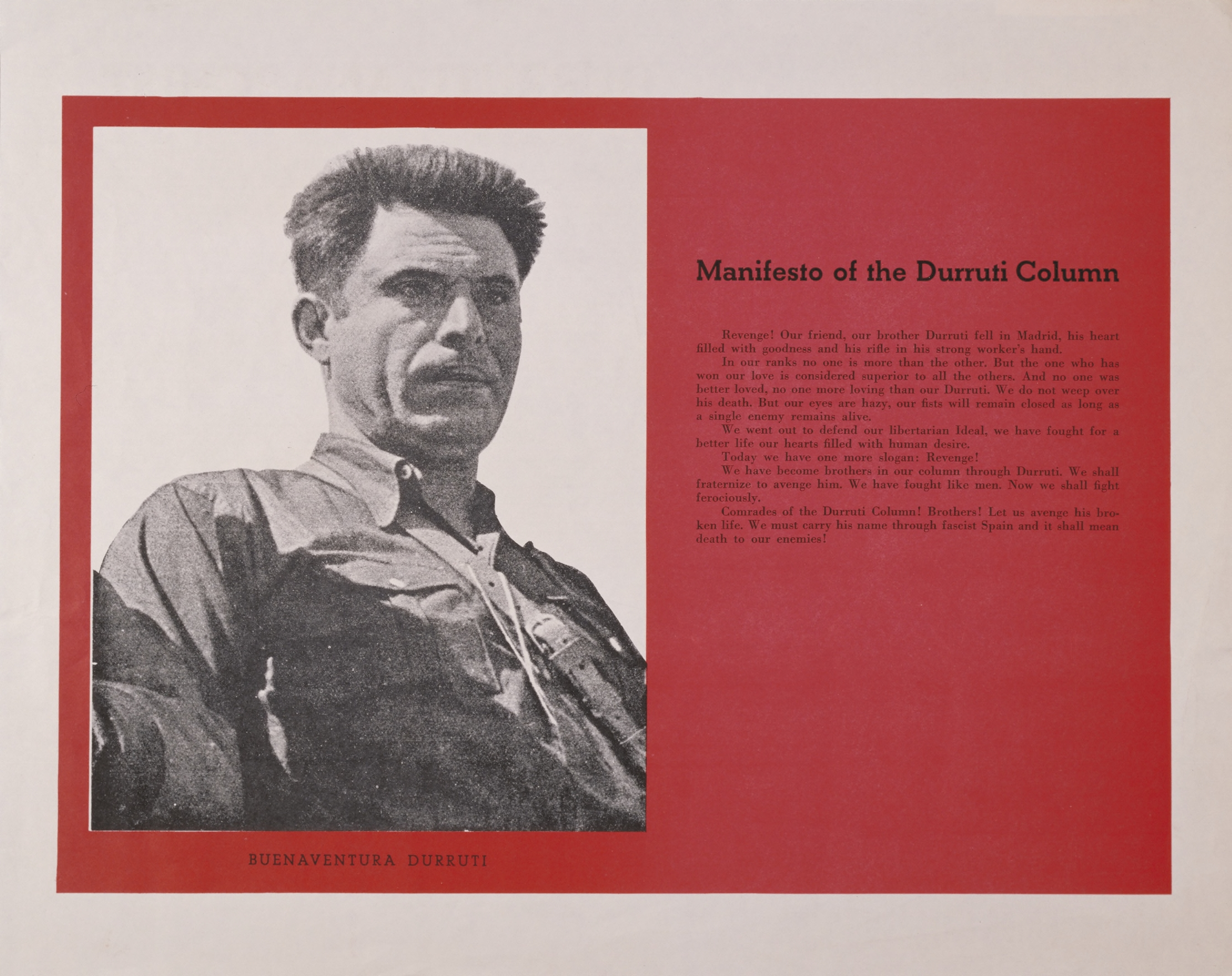
Manifesto of the Durruti Column, published shortly after Durruti's death in 1936.

While Durruti was buried in Barcelona, on 23 November, the Nationalist general staff made the decision to give up on their offensive against Madrid. By the end of the battle, the Durruti Column had lost more than half of its men. Although part of the Durruti Column returned to Aragon, most of the Column remained in Madrid. Around this time, the Durruti Column finally received reinforcements from Catalonia, which gave them the means to relieve the Internationalist columns on the front line. On 7 December, the Durruti Column relieved a Polish company and took its positions on the wall of the Casa de Campo.

From December 1936 to January 1937, the Durruti Column defended El Pardo from a Nationalist flanking maneuver. On 6 January, the Durruti Columnists were abandoned at Casa Quemada by the units on either side of them. Unit commander Joaquín Morlanes Jaulín called up Sanz for reinforcements, and to recover the equipment left behind by the deserter units. Sanz brought along only a small unit, as the reserve battalion were busy holding an assembly to decide whether to go into action. When Sanz took up a machine gun post himself, Jaulín protested that he - as their commanding officer - should be organising defensive lines to their rear so they could carry out a tactical retreat. Sanz begrudgingly obliged, and along with Cipriano Mera, established a defensive line where the Nationalist offensive was halted. The Durruti Column remained in Madrid until April 1937, when the frontlines finally stabilised. The Catalan government then withdrew the Column back to the Aragon front, where they reunited with the militiamen who had remained behind. Sanz soon came into conflict with the communist military officer Francisco Galán, after the latter attempted to bring the Durruti Column under communist control. Sanz later complained that the government of Francisco Largo Caballero did not give the Durruti Column arms or ammunition, "because of his fear of I don't know what".

=== Militarisation ===
On 6 December 1936, the Catalan militia columns in Aragon were formally integrated into the People's Army of Catalonia, following a decree on the militarisation of the militias from October 1936. The army consisted of three divisions (Durruti, Ascaso and Karl Marx), which maintained the names of the militia columns rather than adopting the numbered system of the Spanish Republican Army. During the May Days of 1937, members of the Durruti Column assembled with the intention of marching on Barcelona, but stood down following an appeal from Joan Garcia Oliver. After the May Days, the Spanish Republican government regained control over Catalonia, dissolved the People's Army of Catalonia and integrated its divisions into the Popular Army of the Republic.

The Durruti Column was subsequently reorganised into the 26th Division of the Spanish Republican Army. It remained under the command of Ricardo Sanz, as its lieutenant-colonel. Sanz gladly accepted the militarisation of the militia column, quoting Durruti's slogan "we renounce everything except victory". The column's experiences on the Madrid front had made many of its militiamen more pragmatic about militarisation, with Durruti himself having come to accept the need for a unified command structure and military discipline. Members who had opposed militarisation and the leadership of the CNT formed the Friends of Durruti Group, which participated in the May Days. Francisco Carreño, a former member of the Column's War Committee, was one of the leading figures in the Friends of Durruti.

In early 1938, the former Durruti Column went on to fight against the Nationalist's Aragon Offensive. It was forced into a retreat, but managed to stabilise the front at the Segre river, where they took part in the subsequent Battle of the Segre. The former Durruti Column was then taken into the command structure of the anarchist-led Army of the East. The 26th Division was on the front line when the Nationalists began the Catalonia Offensive, bearing the brunt of the attack and preventing a breakthrough along their lines. The Nationalists then attacked the positions held by the communist-led Ebro Army, breaking their lines and capturing several Catalan cities. The former Durruti Column continued fighting even after the Fall of Barcelona, but by 10 February 1939, it was forced to retreat to France. It was one of the last Republican units to withdraw from the country. In France, the militiamen of the former Durruti Column were interned in Camp Vernet, as the French government considered them a "danger to public safety".

== Organisational structure ==
The structure of the Durruti Column was self-organised, without any hierarchy or chain of command. It functioned on a largely ad hoc basis, with its members collectively making adjustments to its structure over time. Military discipline was established through voluntary agreement and solidarity between militiamen of equal rank, rights and responsibilities. Social influence was used to maintain discipline, rather than strict military punishments. According to anarchist historian Josep Peirats, the Durruti Column's self-discipline meant that militiamen were always willing to volunteer for dangerous missions. Catalan socialist José Torrente Durán, a critic of the anarchist militia system, considered the Durruti Column to have been exceptionally disciplined.

When the Column first left Barcelona on 24 July 1936, it counted between 2,000 militiamen and 5,000 militiamen. By August 1936, their numbers had grown to 6,000; this would be the peak of their numerical strength. The Column faced constantly shortages of weapons and ammunition, with only 3,000 rifles to share between them. The Column also counted 16 machine guns, 9 mortar cannons and 12 artillery cannons. The militiamen were given training on how to use and maintain their weapons, how to defend themselves from artillery and aerial bombardment, how to carry out surprise attacks, and how to fight in close-quarters combat. In contrast to traditional militaries in the Prussian-style, the militiamen were not taught to salute or to "toe the line", as they were considered equals. When militiamen requested leave, their units decided whether to give them permission based on majority vote. They were allowed to leave the front on the condition that their weapon remain with the Column and that they returned on foot, as all weaponry and vehicles were supposed to be used in service of the war effort. Durruti claimed that many militiamen who requested leave would often change their mind and return to the front, which he attributed to their sense of self-esteem and collective responsibility. He said that "here no one is under compulsion [...] those who are afraid to remain at the front can return to the rear". Women were permitted to be at the front with the Column for only two days, before they were required to return to the rearguard. According to the socialist militant Rafael Miralles Bravo, Durruti personally sent the women back in cattle wagons and shot any who returned to the front.

The central body of the Durruti Column was its five-person War Committee, which consisted of Buenaventura Durruti himself, as well as José Esplugas, Antonio Mora, Ricardo Rionda, Luis Ruano and Miguel Yoldi; the War Committee's Head of Information was Antonio Carreño. Alongside it was the Technical-Military Council, an advisory board of experienced military officers, led by Enric Pérez Farràs, and also including José Manzana, Carles Botet and Canciller. According to Durruti, the War Committee and Military Council acted together based on "mutual agreement", and there was no hierarchical separation between the two sections of the Column. Many of the Column's decisions were made by popular assemblies of all militiamen, which could judge the conduct of officers and make changes to strategy. But during battle, the officers were given strict command and control. Although Durruti was responsible for leading the Column in battle, the Column did not convey him unquestioned authority and could remove him if they felt he was no longer representing them well. Durruti believed that coordinated action required agreement between militiamen on its necessity; according to a CNT pamphlet, "Durruti never commanded, he convinced".

The Column's basic military unit consisted of 10-25 people in a group; groups then federated together into a century, made up of about 100 people; and 5 centuries formed a grouping. Each unit elected its own recallable delegates to coordinate with other units through a central committee, which was led by a single person elected by the grouping as a whole. Elected delegates were given no special privileges unique to their position, and had no authority to command obedience of the rank-and-file. Luis Ruano was elected as the representative of the Column's 1st Sector, with its 1st Grouping represented by José Mira, its 2nd Grouping represented by Liberto Roig and its 3rd Grouping represented by José Esplugas. Miguel Yoldi was elected as the representative of the 2nd Sector, with its 4th Grouping represented by José Gómez Talón, its 5th Grouping represented by José Tarín and its 6th Grouping represented by J. Silvestre. Antonio Mora was elected as representative of the 3rd Sector, with its 7th Grouping represented by Subirats, its 8th Grouping represented by Edo and its 9th Grouping represented by R. García. Militiamen were required to obey the orders of delegates during battle, but could replace them during meetings if they disagreed with their conduct.

The Column had autonomous groups, including the International Group, a detachment of 400 foreign volunteers led by the French captain Louis Berthomieu. Among these was the Sebastian Faure centuria, which consisted of about 100 French anarchists. The Column also had a number of guerrilla groups which penetrated behind enemy lines. Among the guerrilla groups were Los Hijos de la Noche and La Banda Negra. The Column maintained a cultural section, which provided education to militiamen and broadcast propaganda to Nationalist soldiers. It also published the bulletin El Frente which reported on military updates and provided a platform for militiamen to offer ideas and criticism. Émilienne Morin led the Column's military administration, a bakery was run by the Subirats brothers, a mechanical workshop was established by Antonio Roda and a team of surgeons and nurses ran the Column's health service. Jesús Arnal, an Aragonese Catholic Priest, worked as a clerk for the Column's Centurias committee, alongside Roda and Esplugas. Durruti himself reported that the food they were served was of high quality, and that militiamen occupied their free time by reading books, attending lectures and building fortifications.

== Legacy ==
The Durruti Column was the most famous of the militia units established by the Republican faction during the early months of the civil war. In historiography of the siege of Madrid, the Durruti Column's role in the defense of the capital is often obscured, and many historians neglect to cover its continued existence after Durruti's death. Anarchists consider it to have played a decisive role in the defense of the Spanish capital, while communists emphasise the role of the International Brigades. After returning to his work as a priest in Francoist Spain, Jesús Arnal wrote his memoirs of the conflict to justify why he had been in the Durruti Column.

== Bibliography ==
- Alexander, Robert J. (1999). The Anarchists in the Spanish Civil War. London: Janus Publishing Company. ISBN 978-1-85756-400-6.
- Alpert, Michael (2013). The Republican Army in the Spanish Civil War, 1936–1939. Cambridge University Press. ISBN 978-1-107-02873-9.
- Beevor, Antony (2006) [1982]. The Battle for Spain: The Spanish Civil War 1936–1939. London: Weidenfeld & Nicolson. ISBN 0-2978-4832-1.
- Bolloten, Burnet (1991). The Spanish Civil War: Revolution and Counterrevolution. University of North Carolina Press. ISBN 0-8078-1906-9. LCCN 89-77911.
- Casanova, Julián (2005). Preston, Paul (ed.). Anarchism, the Republic and Civil War in Spain: 1931–1939. Translated by Dowling, Andrew; Pollok, Graham. Routledge. ISBN 0-415-32095-X.
- Graham, Helen (2002). The Spanish Republic at War, 1936–1939. Cambridge: Cambridge University Press. ISBN 0-521-45932-X. OCLC 464890766.
- Kern, Robert W. (1978). Red Years/Black Years: A Political History of Spanish Anarchism, 1911-1937. Institute for the Study of Human Issues. ISBN 0-915980-54-1. LCCN 77-13595.
- Paz, Abel (2006) [1996]. Durruti in the Spanish Revolution. Translated by Morse, Chuck. Edinburgh: AK Press. ISBN 1-904859-50-X. LCCN 2006920974. OCLC 482919277.
- Thomas, Hugh (2001) [1961]. The Spanish Civil War (4th ed.). New York: Modern Library. ISBN 0-375-75515-2.
