= Combat vehicle =

Military vehicle designed for combat

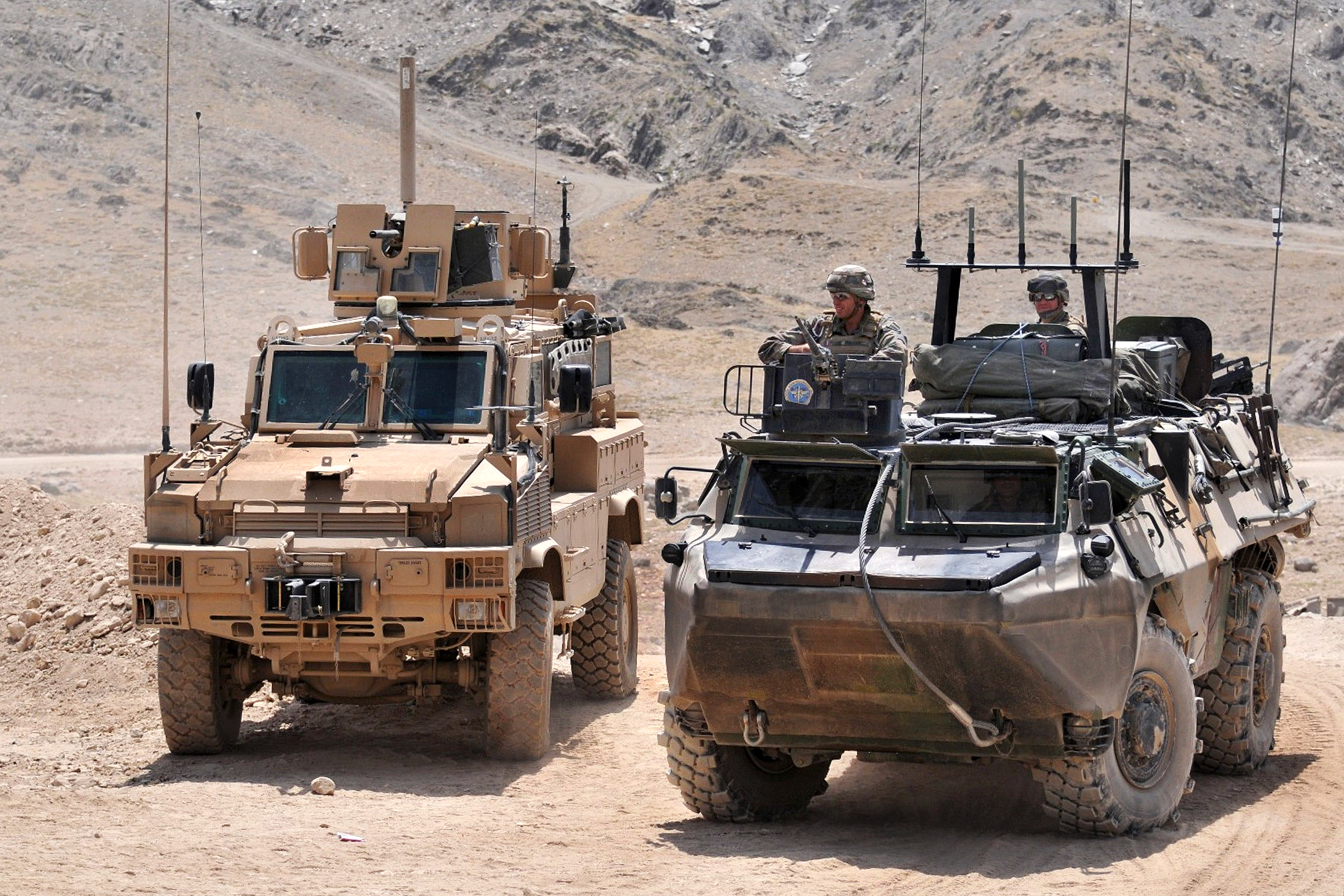
An RG-31 Nyala MRAP and a Véhicule de l'Avant Blindé armoured personnel carrier

A ground combat vehicle, also known as a land assault vehicle or simply a combat vehicle or an assault vehicle, is a land-based military vehicle intended to be used for combat operations. They differ from non-combat military vehicles such as trucks in that they are designed for use in active combat zones, to be used in mechanized warfare and mobile infantry roles.

The classification of "combat vehicle" is a very broad category, and may include armored cars, armored personnel carriers, infantry fighting vehicles, infantry mobility vehicles, MRAPs, and tanks. Improvised fighting vehicles such as technicals can also count as combat vehicles. Most modern combat vehicles have vehicle armor, offensive or defensive weaponry, and sufficient space to carry passengers, equipment, or materiel; if the first two both apply, the vehicle may be considered an armored fighting vehicle.

== History ==
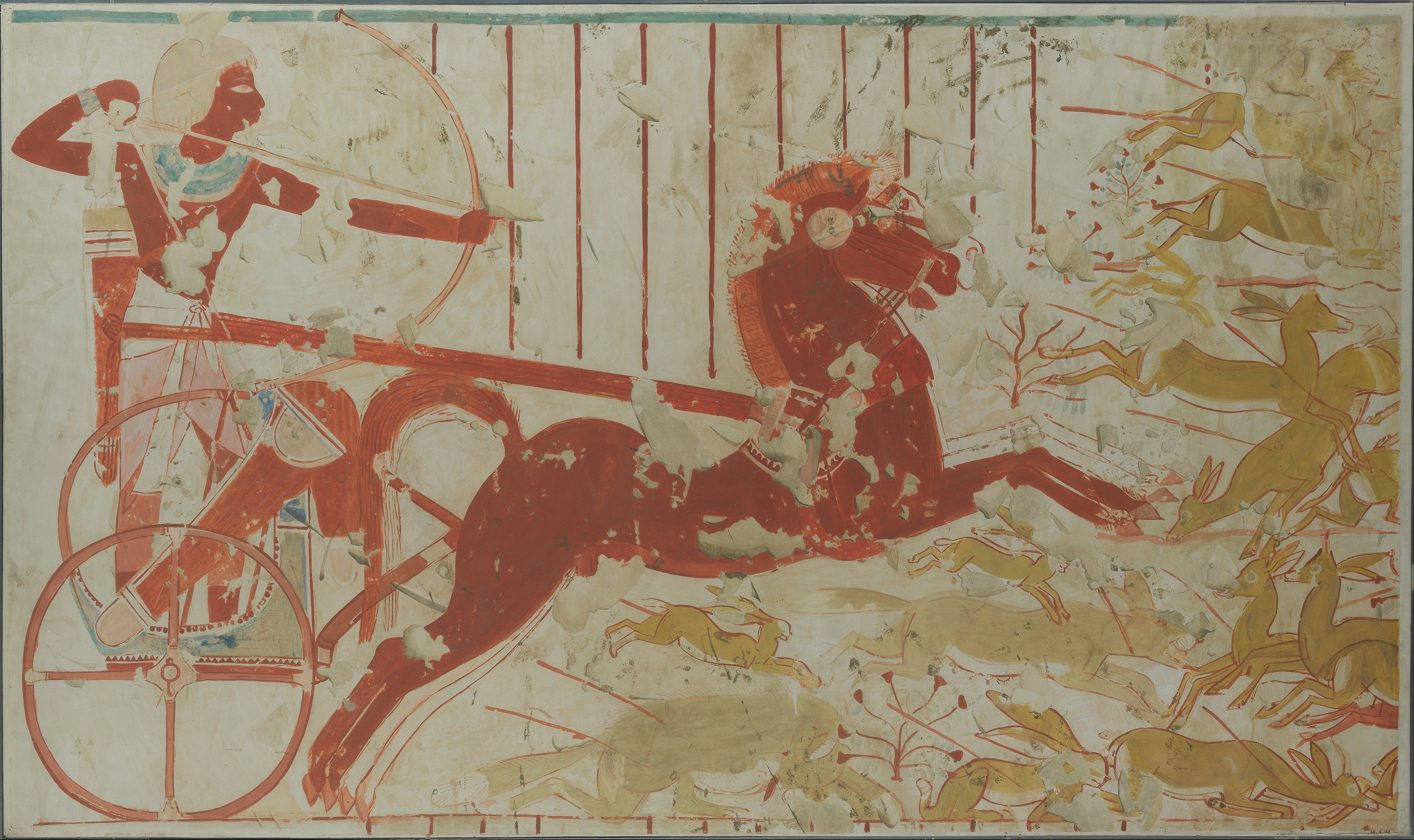
Ancient Egyptian warrior wielding a bow and arrow on a chariot

For much of history, most soldiers not fighting on foot (e.g. cavalry) used military animals such as horses or elephants, as land vehicles for the most part did not exist.

One of the earliest forms of "combat vehicles" was the chariot. In ancient warfare, chariots were used as "battle taxis" and mobile archery platforms during the Bronze and Iron ages. However, weaponry was not installed on the vehicle, relying on the soldier's carried weapon for armament, and armor was effectively limited to a shield and the thin structure of the chariot, if those were even available or sufficient.

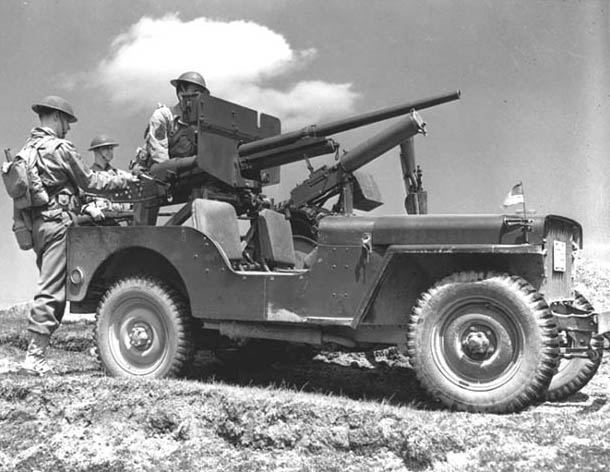
A United States Army Willys MB with a 37 mm gun M3 and an M1917 Browning machine gun in 1942

With the invention of the automobile, combat vehicles took varying forms, ranging from the lightly armored passenger cars of the World War I era to the widely fielded Willys MB of World War II, along with a wide variety of other combat vehicles such as half-tracks and multiple classifications of tanks. Development of combat vehicles continued into the Cold War as military tactics and technology evolved, diversifying the role of vehicles in war and making them an essential aspect of modern warfare.

== Design ==
=== Automation ===
The automation of human tasks endeavors to reduce the required crew size with improvements in robotics. Enhancements to automation can help achieve operational effectiveness with a smaller, more economical, combat vehicle force. The automation of combat vehicles has proved to be difficult due to the time latency between the operator controlling the vehicle and the signal being received. Unlike air forces, ground forces must navigate the terrain and plan around obstacles. The rapid tactical implications of operating a weaponized vehicle in a combat environment are great.

=== Countermeasures ===
Use of titanium armor on combat vehicles is increasing. The use of titanium can lighten the vehicle's weight.

Appliqué armor can be quickly applied to vehicles and has been utilized on a number of combat vehicles, such as the M8 armored gun system.

Fire suppression

Contemporary combat vehicles may incorporate a fire-suppression system to mitigate damage from fire. Systems can be employed in the engine and crew compartments and portable systems may be mounted inside and outside the vehicle as well.

Automatic fire suppression systems activate instantaneously upon the detection of fire and have been shown to significantly improve crew survivability. Halon fire suppression systems quickly inundate an affected fire breach with a flood of halon to extinguish leaking fuel. Halon remains necessary for crew compartment fire suppression due to space and weight constraints, and toxicity concerns. Nitrogen systems take up about twice as much space as a comparable halon unit. Germany uses this system as a replacement for its halon system. Some systems, such as Germany's previous extinguisher, have a second shot of suppressant to mitigate re-ignition or the effects of a second hit.

Though not as instantaneous, portable crew-operable extinguishers are also used inside and outside the vehicle. Typically, portable extinguishers use a CO_{2} agent instead of the halon agents used in the past. CO_{2} can become lethal to vehicle occupants if it accumulates into a deadly concentration. The U.S. Army has adopted a replacement formula consisting of 50% water, 50% potassium acetate. Alternatives such as powder formulas also exist.

=== Crew and occupants ===
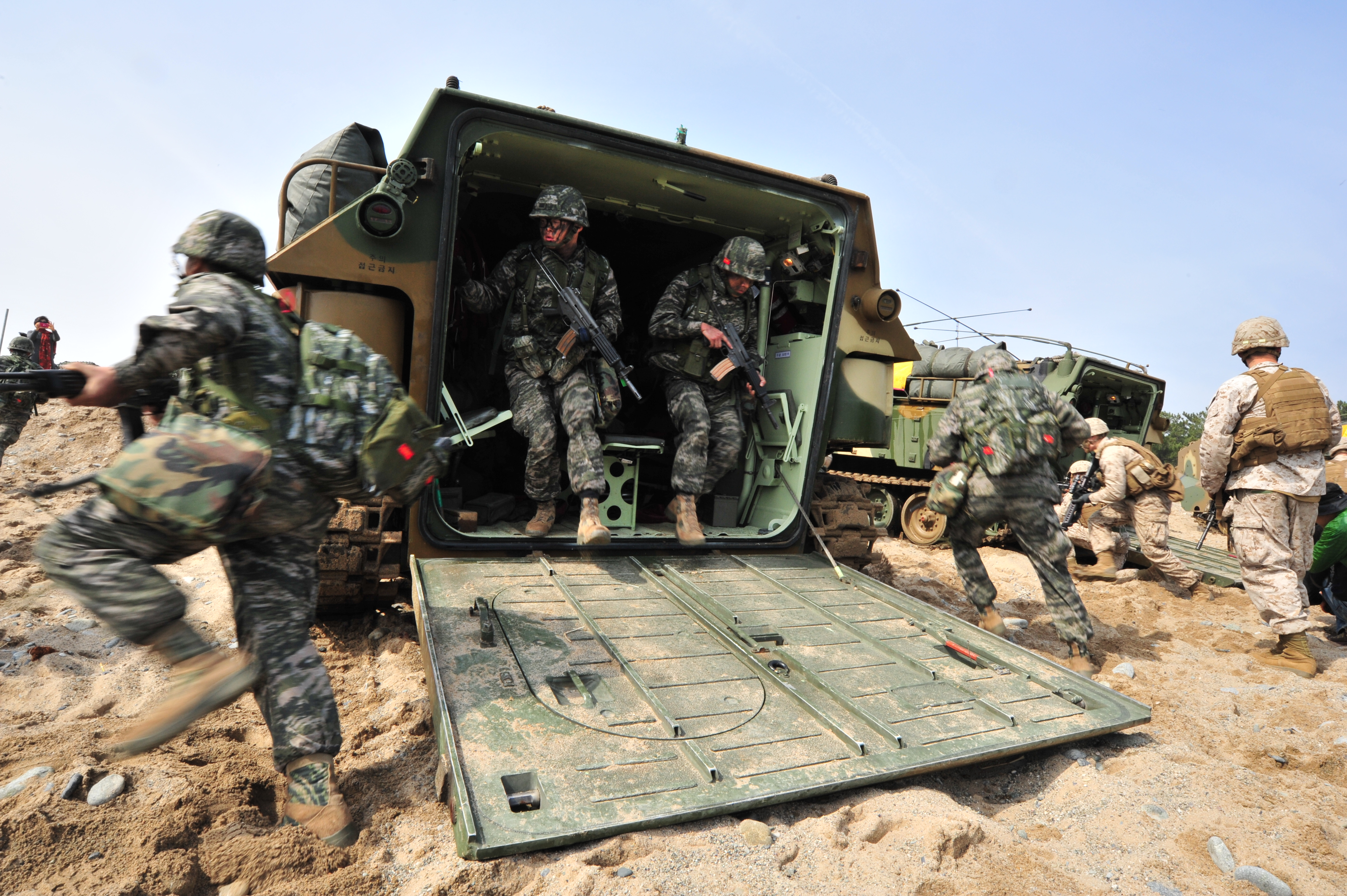
Republic of Korea Marines disembarking from an Assault Amphibious Vehicle

Combat vehicles require at least one crew member, though typically at least two (one driver and one gunner). Some vehicles, such as armored personnel carriers, also contain a dedicated passenger bay, able to carry up to a dozen or more passengers. Hygiene upkeep is difficult when operating a combat vehicle.

=== Mobility ===
Tracked combat vehicles are suited for heavy combat and rough terrain. Wheeled combat vehicles offer improved logistical mobility and optimized speeds on smooth terrain.

Silent watch is becoming an increasingly important combat vehicle application. It is a role that requires that all mission requirements be met while keeping acoustic and infrared signature levels to a minimum. For this reason, silent watch often requires the vehicle to operate without use of the main engine and sometimes even auxiliary engines. Many modern combat vehicles often have electronic equipment that cannot be supported solely with auxiliary batteries alone. Auxiliary fuel cells are a potential solution for covert operations.

=== Networking ===
Force trackers are not as prevalent as in air forces, but are still essential components of combat vehicles.

In the mid-1990s, U.S. weapon developers envisioned a sophisticated communication network where positions of enemy and friendly forces could be relayed to command vehicles and other friendly vehicles. Friendly vehicles could transmit enemy positions to friendly combat vehicles in combat range for efficient annihilation of the enemy. Logistics support could also monitor front-line combat vehicle fuel and ammunition statuses and move in to resupply depleted vehicles.

=== Weaponry ===
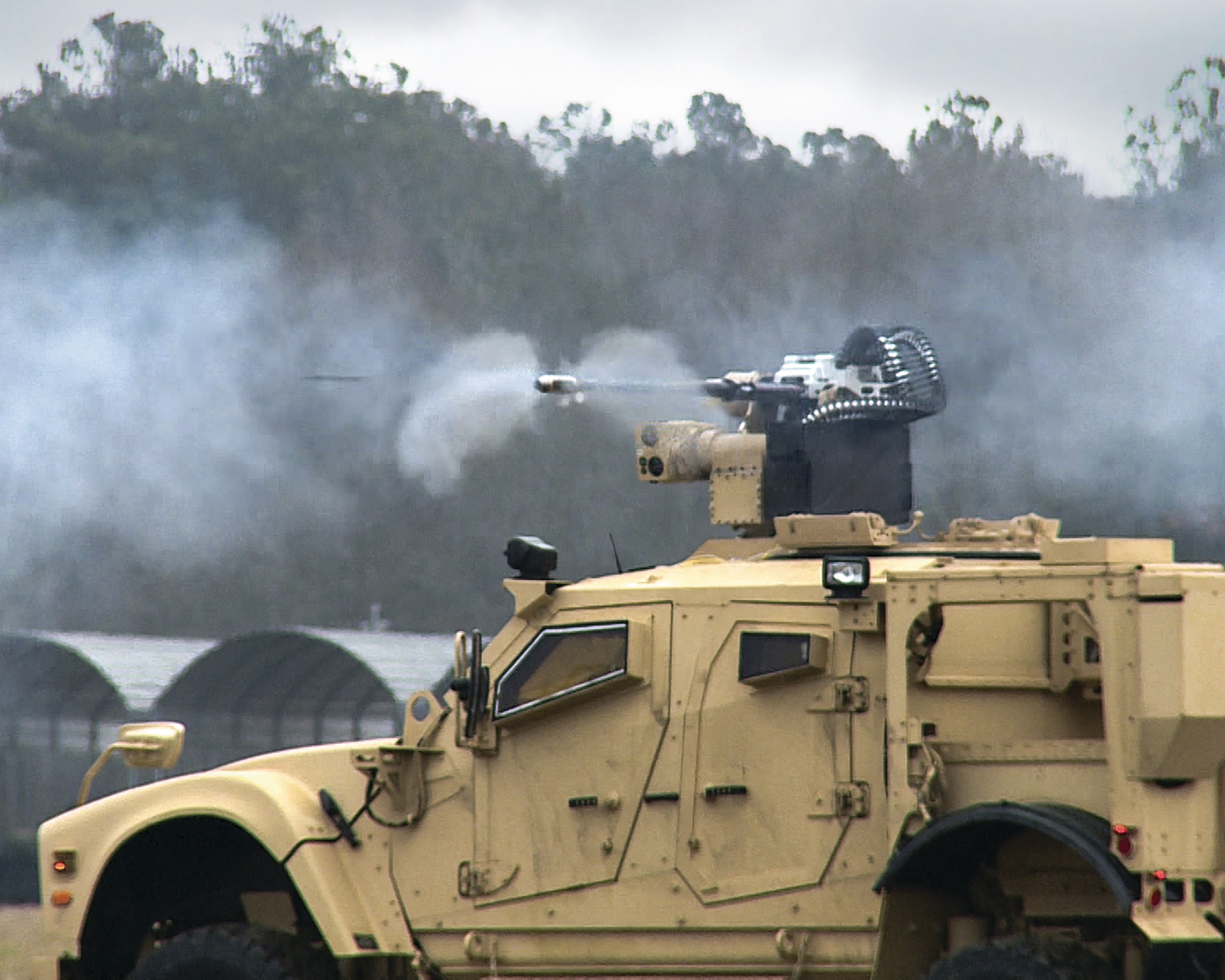
An Oshkosh M-ATV firing its M230 chain gun

Weapons mounted on combat vehicles are primarily designed for engaging infantry or other combat vehicles at a distance. They may consist of weapons such as machine guns, automatic grenade launchers, or simply the presence of firing ports or armored turrets for the crew or infantry to fire their own issued weaponry from. Some combat vehicles may also carry anti-armor or anti-vehicle weaponry such as autocannons or anti-tank guided missiles. High-caliber or dedicated combat vehicles such as tanks or self-propelled weaponry may carry tank guns, multiple rocket launchers, artillery, or anti-aircraft weapons.

Most combat vehicles are not optimized for destroying non-traditional targets such as car bombs, though many may be designed to be resistant to explosives.

== See also ==
- Military aircraft
- Naval ship
- Space weapon
