= Miguel Yoldi =

Spanish trade unionist

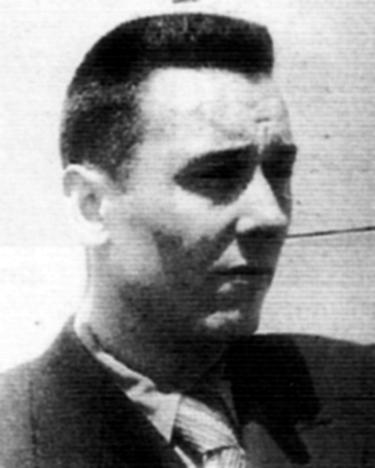
- Yoldi (c. 1934)

General Secretary of the Confederación Nacional del Trabajo
- In office December 1933 – February 1935
- Preceded by: Manuel Rivas
- Succeeded by: Horacio Prieto

Personal details
- Born: Miguel Yoldi Beroiz; 14 April 1903 Pamplona, Navarre, Spain
- Died: 13 August 1961 (aged 58) Matamoros, Tamaulipas, Mexico

Military service
- Allegiance: Spanish Republic
- Branch/service: Confederal militias (1936–1937); Spanish Republican Army (1937–1939)
- Years of service: 1936–1939
- Unit: Durruti Column (1936–1937); 24th Division (1937–1938)
- Battles/wars: Spanish Civil War: July 1936 military uprising in Barcelona; Siege of Madrid; Battle of Ciudad Universitaria; Aragon Offensive

Miguel Yoldi Beroiz (14 April 1903 – 13 August 1961) was a Navarrese anarcho-syndicalist.

== Biography ==
On 14 April 1903, Miguel Yoldi Beroiz was born in Pamplona. He was educated at the House of Mercy in Pamplona and later worked as a turner, sailor and teacher. In 1920, at the age of 17, he joined the National Confederation of Labor (CNT).

During the Dictatorship of Primo de Rivera he went into exile in France, from where he returned when the Second Republic was proclaimed (1931). He then opened a bookshop with the aim of disseminating anarchist literature, a task to which he devoted himself until in 1934 he was elected General Secretary of the CNT, replacing Joaquín Ascaso Budria and moved to Barcelona. He held the position until the Congress of Zaragoza in 1936, where he was replaced by Horacio Martínez Prieto.

When the Spanish Civil War broke out, Yoldi was elected Secretary of Defense of Catalonia and faced the military uprising in the streets of Barcelona on 19 July 1936. He later joined the Aragon Offensive as a member of the Durruti Column, with which later he went to the defense of Madrid as an assistant of Buenaventura Durruti himself. He was wounded in the fighting in the University City of Madrid, where Durruti died. In December 1937 he returned to the Aragon front, where he replaced Enric Pérez i Farràs as head of the militia of the 24th Division of the XII Army of the Republic, together with José Manzana Vivó. After the fall of the Aragonese front in the spring of 1938, he was arrested by Republican authorities and his command of the division was withdrawn. From then until the end of the war he was a member of the Selection Board of the Military Academy.

At the end of the war he went into exile with his family, settling first in France and later in Mexico, where he formed the group of CNT leaders that decided to collaborate with the Spanish Republican government in exile. In 1945 he became an adviser to Horacio Martínez Prieto, while he was minister of the José Giral government, and from 1947 until his death he held various positions in the CNT in exile.

== Works ==
- Controversial polemics (1946)
