= Horacio Martínez Prieto =

Spanish trade unionist (1902–1985)

Horacio Prieto
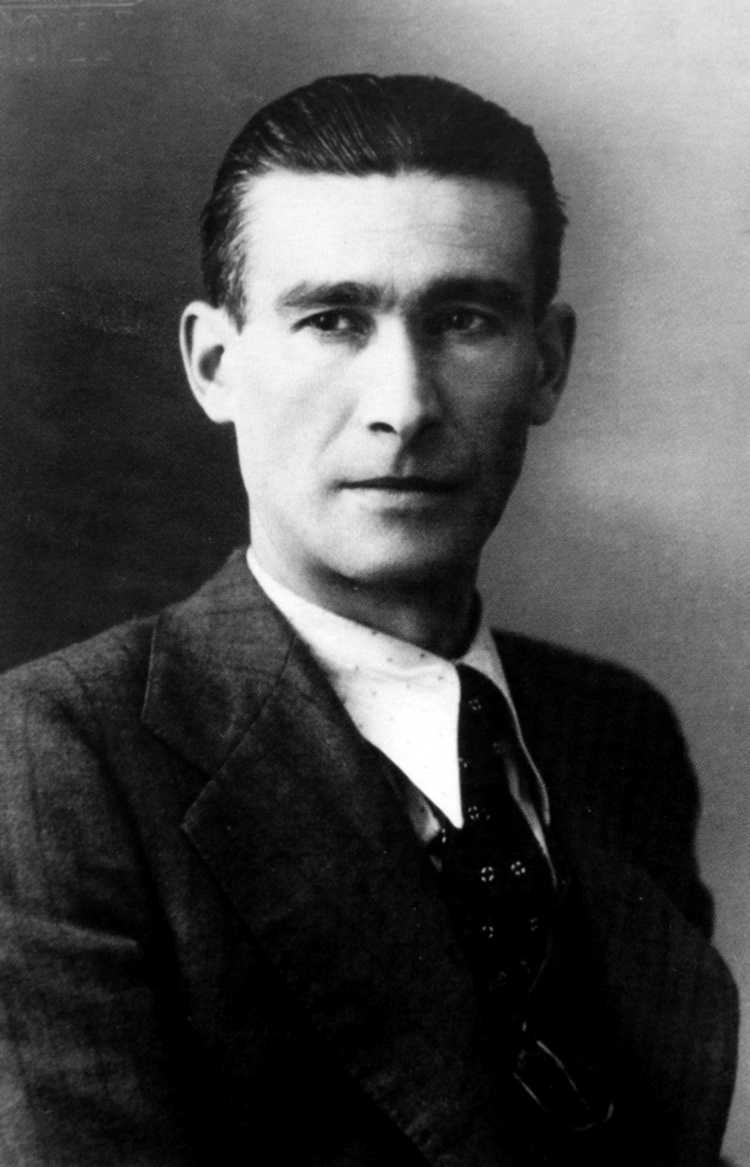
- Prieto (March 1937)

General Secretary of the Confederación Nacional del Trabajo
- In office March 1935 – 18 July 1936
- Preceded by: Miguel Yoldi
- Succeeded by: David Antona (provisional)
- In office September 1936 – 18 November 1936
- Preceded by: David Antona (provisional)
- Succeeded by: Mariano Vázquez

Personal details
- Born: Horacio Martínez Prieto; 29 December 1902 Santurtzi, Biscay, Euskadi, Spain
- Died: 26 April 1985 (aged 82) Paris, France

Horacio Martínez Prieto (1902–1985) was a Basque anarcho-syndicalist, of the libertarian possibilist tendency, and on two occasions the General Secretary of the CNT.

== Biography ==
Acracio Martínez Prieto was born in Santurtzi as the son of an anarchist father, his named was changed to Horacio by the Bilbao civil registry of the Ollerías neighborhood. Horacio studied at a municipal school, where he was beaten by his teacher – to which his father responded with a knife. Despite being a good student, Horacio did not receive any scholarship and had to immediately find work. As a teenager, he discarded all the predominant ideologies (nationalism, socialism or Carlism) and instead formed a libertarian group, "Los sin patria" (Those without country). Horacio was saved from being lynched by a group of Basque nationalists, due to the intervention of a rival gang from the Bilbao neighborhood of Bolueta. He took up the habit of carrying a pistol, which landed him in the Larrinaga prison in Bilbao at only 18 years of age, where he came into contact with a variety of different comrades. An attack in Altos Hornos de Vizcaya meant for Horacio the beginning of a long series of dangerous incidents, which forced him into exile in France, leaving his mother, already a widow, in Bilbao. Not long after Primo de Rivera's coup in 1923, Horacio participated in an attempted anarchist takeover of Vera de Bidasoa, but managed to escape again.

In 1931, when the Second Spanish Republic was proclaimed, he joined the CNT. In 1932 he was invited by the PCE to visit Russia along with the director of Tierra Vasca, but he returned with unfavorable impressions – he was initially cautious in sharing his views but later published a pamphlet that was critical of the Soviet system. Following the CNT's participation in the Revolution of 1934, he took the post of Deputy Secretary of the CNT, and in 1935 at the Congress of Zaragoza, Prieto replaced Miguel Yoldi as the CNT's general secretary.

The outbreak of the Spanish Civil War surprised Prieto in Bilbao, where he represented the CNT in the Basque Defence Council until he moved to Barcelona. Due to his proposal to involve the CNT in the governments of Azaña and Largo Caballero, he was accused of being a traitor and a liquidationist, which led him to resign from his post in November 1936, although he continued representing the Northern Region in the CNT's National Committee and as a member of the Political Advisory Commission (CAP), from where he defended the participation of the CNT in the government of the Second Spanish Republic. Affiliated with the FAI, he was general director of commerce under the ministry of Juan López Sánchez (November 1936 – May 1937) and Undersecretary of Health under Segundo Blanco (April 1938 – February 1939).

== Works ==
- Anarchosyndicalism. How we make the Revolution (1933)
- Facets of the USSR (Santander 1933)
- The Problems of the Spanish Revolution (1933)
- Relative Anarchism. Revisionist Fact Criticism and Suggestion (Mexico 1948)
- Spanish Anarchism in the Political Struggle (1946)
- Marxism and Libertarian Socialism (1947)
- Libertarian Possibilism , Choisy-le-Roi, Imp. Des Gondoles, 1966. 181 p.
- Profile and Personality of Galo Díez (unpublished)
- Basque government. Some Background to the Euskadi-North CNT White Paper (unpublished)

Preceded by Miguel Yoldi	General Secretary of the CNT 1935-1936	Succeeded by Mariano Vázquez
