= Relief in place =

Military operation

A relief in place is a military operation whereby the relieving unit or formation replaces the force being relieved on a more or less one-for-one basis in situ and takes over its mission and assigned zone of operations. Once the relieving forces have been briefed on the situation and ground, the relieved troops then withdraw.

The relief in place is thus distinguished from other types of relief operation such as the "relief by forward passage of lines" and "relief by rearward passage of lines" whereby the incoming unit passes through the in-place force and takes over the mission from a position respectively ahead of or behind the existing troops.

== Sources ==
- JCS Pub 1-02, DOD, NATO
