= Enric Pérez Farràs =

Spanish military personnel (1884–1949)

- Born: 1884; Lleida, Spain
- Died: 1949 (aged 64–65); Cuautla, Mexico
- Other names: Enrique Pérez Farrás; Enric Pérez i Farràs
- Military career
- Allegiance: Generalitat de Catalunya
- Service: Mossos d'Esquadra
- Conflicts: Spanish Civil War

Enric Pérez Farràs (1884 in Lleida – 1949 in Cuautla, Mexico) was a Catalan military commander.

== Biography ==
Enric Pérez Farràs was born in Lleida, in 1884, the son of Enric Pérez i Dalmau and Teresa Farràs i Vila. He was married to Elisabet Coëmans.

In 1930 he was the artillery commander of the Spanish Army, he opposed to the dictatorship of Primo de Rivera, due to the confrontation between the artillery corps and the dictator. He participated in clandestine meetings of officers against the monarchy of Alfonso XIII. In 1931, following the proclamation of the Second Spanish Republic, the president of the Generalitat de Catalunya, Francesc Macià, appointed him head of the Mossos d'Esquadra. He was a sympathizer of Catalan nationalism. During the insurrection of the Generalitat in Revolution of 1934, he seconded the proclamation of Lluís Companys and participated in the defense of the Palace of the Generalitat of Catalonia against the troops of Domingo Batet. For this Pérez Farràs was tried in a court martial and sentenced to death along with other officers such as Federic Escofet i Alsina, but the sentence was commuted by the President of the Republic Alcalá Zamora for perpetual imprisonment.

The victory of the Popular Front in the 1936 Spanish general election caused him to be pardoned and released, being readmitted to the army. With the Generalitat restored, he regained his position at the head of the Mossos and was one of the officers who contributed to quelling the July 1936 military uprising in Barcelona, when he directed the attack on the headquarters of the Captaincy General of Catalunya and arrested Manuel Goded, leader of the military rebellion in Barcelona.

Once the Spanish Civil War broke out, Farrás was appointed "military chief" of the Central Committee of Antifascist Militias and later assigned to the Aragon Front as military adviser to the Durruti Column, without ever meeting with Buenaventura Durruti. He returned to Barcelona and spent the rest of the war in bureaucratic positions, as military governor of Tarragona and, later, of Girona. At the end of the civil war he went into exile in Mexico. He held a high position in a bank run by Catalan exiles. He collaborated with articles on military strategy in the magazine Quaderns de l'exili and proposed to form a unit of Catalan soldiers together with the Allies during the Second World War.

He died in Mexico in 1949.

== Bibliography ==
- Alexander, Robert J. (1999). The Anarchists in the Spanish Civil War. Vol. I. Janus Publishing Company Ltd. ISBN 978-1-85756-412-9.
- Alpert, Michael (2013). The Republican Army in the Spanish Civil War, 1936-1939. Cambridge University Press.
- Casanova, Julián; Gil Andrés, Carlos (2014). Twentieth-Century Spain: A History. Cambridge University Press. ISBN 978-1-107-01696-5.
- Escofet i Alsina, Frederic (1973). Al servei de Catalunya i de la República. La desfeta. 6 d'octubre 1934 (in Catalan). Paris: Edicions Catalanes De París. ISBN 2-85041-012-8.
- Gabriel, Pere (2011). Historia de la UGT IV. Un sindicalismo en guerra (1936-1939) (in Spanish). Siglo XXI de España Editores.
- Gonzàlez i Vilalta, Arnau; Ucelay-Da Cal, Enric (2012). Contra Companys, 1936: La frustración nacionalista ante la Revolución (in Spanish). Universidad de Valencia.
- Liz Vázquez, Antonio (2007). Octubre de 1934: Insurrecciones y revolución (in Spanish). Espuela de Plata. ISBN 978-84-96956-45-2.
- Romero, Luis (1994). Tres días de julio. (18, 19 y 20 de 1936) (in Spanish). Ed. Ariel.
- Preston, Paul (2013). El Holocausto Español. Odio y Exterminio en la Guerra Civil y después (in Spanish). Barcelona: Debolsillo.
