= Osera de Ebro =

Coordinates: 41°32′00″N 0°35′00″W

- municipality
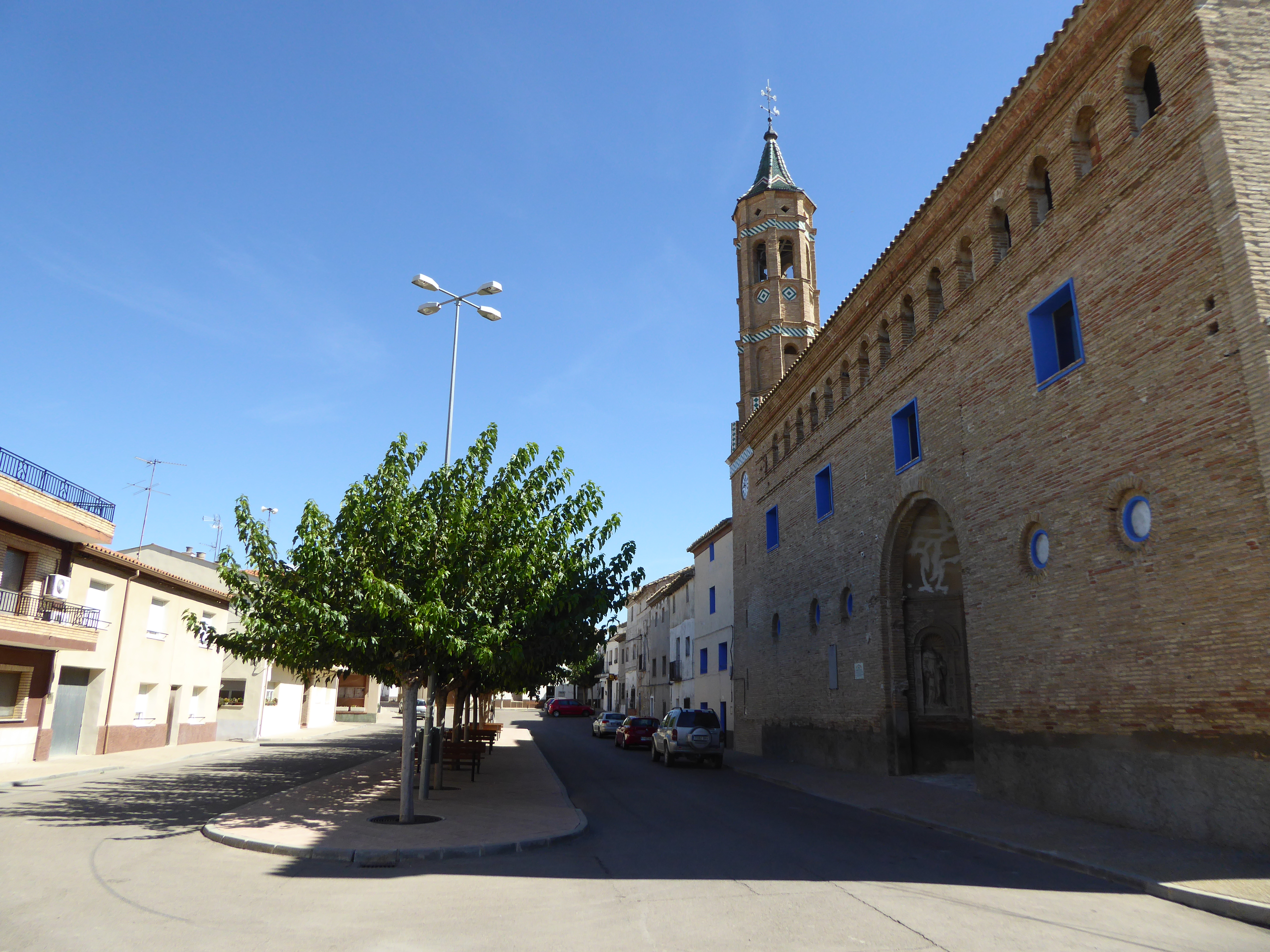
- Church of Santa Engracia in Osera de Ebro Municipal

- Coat of arms
- Interactive map of Osera de Ebro
- Country: Spain
- Autonomous community: Aragon
- Province: Zaragoza

Area
  - Total: 24 km^{2} (9.3 sq mi)

Population (2025-01-01)
  - Total: 442
  - Density: 18/km^{2} (48/sq mi)
- Time zone: UTC+1 (CET)
  - Summer (DST): UTC+2 (CEST)

Osera de Ebro is a municipality located in the province of Zaragoza, Aragon, Spain. According to the 2004 census (INE), the municipality has a population of 379 inhabitants.

== See also ==
- List of municipalities in Zaragoza
