= Mobile infantry =

Infantry units with higher mobility than regular infantry

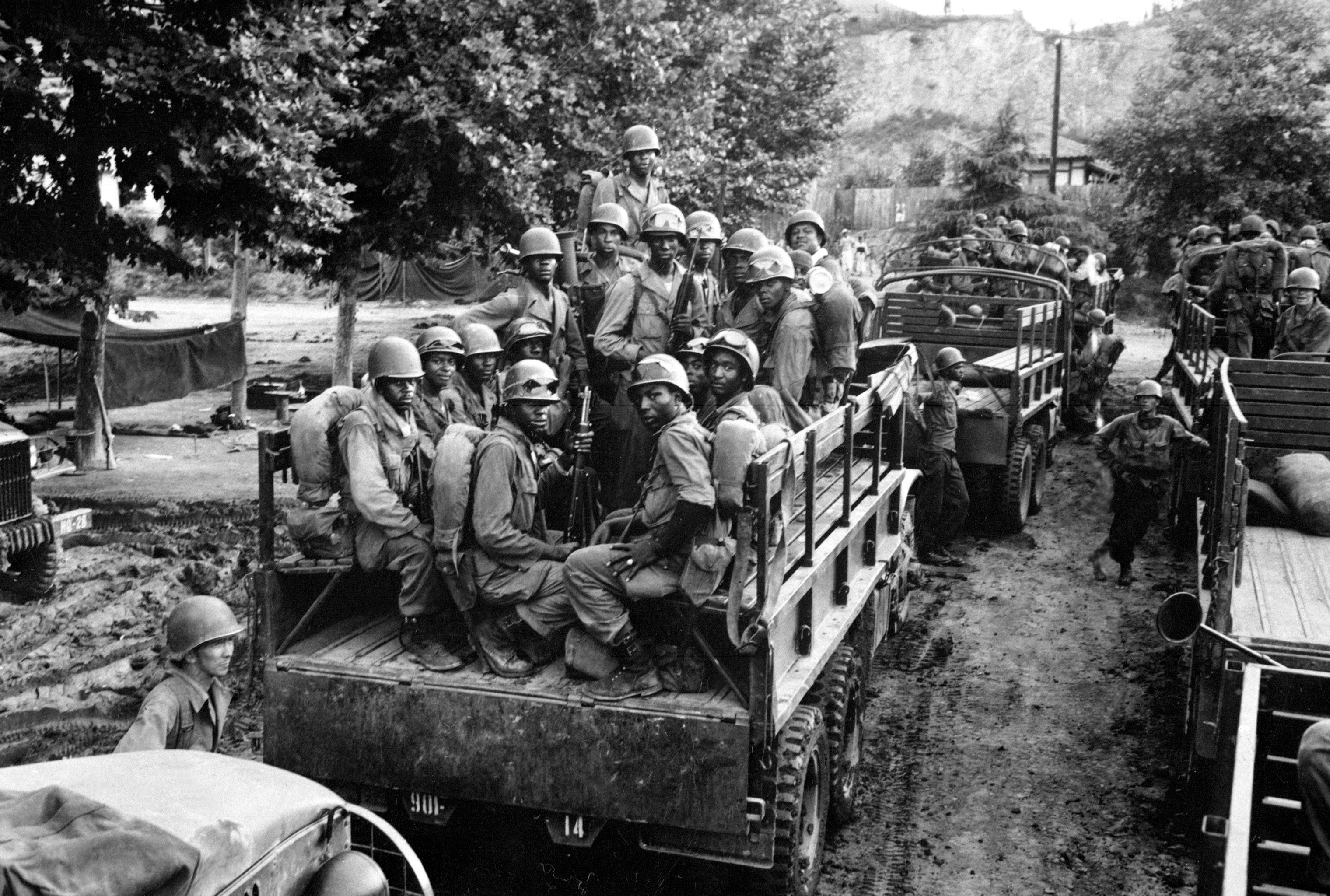
United States Army 24th Infantry Regiment soldiers riding in the back of a military truck during the Korean War, 1950

Mobile infantry refers to infantry that has superior mobility to traditional infantry, the latter being expected to march into battle. Mobile infantry, on the other hand, is better equipped with vehicles for transportation to and on the battlefield. Examples include:

- Mechanized infantry, equipped with armored personnel carriers (APCs) or infantry fighting vehicles (IFVs)
- Motorized infantry, employing trucks or other vehicles, but not APCs or IFVs
- Mounted infantry, riding horses. Dragoons were originally mounted infantry
- Bicycle infantry, specifically employing bicycles for movement
- Airmobile infantry, carried by helicopter or other aircraft.

== In fiction ==
In Robert A. Heinlein's 1959 science fiction novel Starship Troopers, the Mobile Infantry is a separate branch of the armed forces whose soldiers wear powered exoskeletons that enable them to move faster and jump higher. The 1997 film of the same name was based on Heinlein's story and multiple spinoffs followed.
