= Encarnación Fuyola =

Spanish teacher and Communist activist

Encarnación Fuyola Miret
- Born: 3 September 1907; Huesca, Aragon, Spain
- Died: 8 December 1982 (aged 75); Mexico City, Mexico

Encarnación Fuyola Miret (3 September 1907 – 8 December 1982) was a Spanish teacher and Communist activist who played a significant role as a propagandist in the period leading up to and during the Spanish Civil War. Later she went into exile in Mexico.

== Early years ==
Encarnación Fuyola Miret was born in Huesca, Aragon on 3 September 1907 in her parents' home on calle Vega Armijo. Her father was a science assistant at the Huesca teachers' training college, and from 1923 owned a private school on Calle de Santa Paciencia. Encarnación Fuyola was able to study at the Faculty of Sciences of the Central University of Madrid from 1925 to 1929, which was unusual for a woman at the time. She then moved to Barcelona, where she majored in Teaching. While in Barcelona in 1930 she joined the Spanish Communist Party. Before that she belonged to Rebelión, a group of young and independent socialists that included Navarro Ballesteros and Fernández Checa. They joined the PCE, as did the Party of the Revolutionary and Anti-Imperialist Left of César Falcón and Graco Marsal.

== Career ==
After completing her academic training in 1933 Fuyola began teaching and also became an official in the auxiliary postal service. During these years she was involved in the Federation of Education Workers (FETE: Federación de Trabajadores de la Enseñanza). Her commitment to Communist ideals and her political abilities led to her being proposed by her comrades as candidate for Huesca and Zaragoza in the election of deputies to the Cortes in November 1933. She did poorly, but became known as a leading Communist in the region. She, Lucía Barón and Irene Falcón launched the publication ¡Compañera!, the organ of working women in the towns and country.

In mid-1933 the World Committee Against War and Fascism sent a delegation to Spain to contact women interesting in forming a local branch. Fuyola joined the newly formed National Committee of Women Against War and Fascism, as did Dolores Ibárruri, Lucía Barón and Irene Falcón. They contacted Republican and Socialist women through the Socialist deputy and well-known writer María Lejárraga. In August 1934 the Spanish committee sent a delegation to the World Congress of Women against War and Fascism in Paris. Dolores Ibárruri led the group, which included two Republicans and two Communists, Encarnación Fuyola and Irene Falcón. The Spanish committee was dissolved in October 1934 during the repression that followed the Asturian miners' strike.

Encarnación Fuyola, Dolores Ibárruri and others launched the Organization for Workers' Children, from which eventually emerged the Association of Antifascist Women (AMA: Asociación de Mujeres Antifascistas). Fuyola was active in creating this association, and became its secretary-general. She was a member of the board of Mujeres (Women), the official publication of the AMA whose first issue was published on 15 February 1936. She also headed the International Red Aid (Socorro Rojo). In 1936, just before the outbreak of the Spanish Civil War (1936–39) she worked in the main postal administration in Madrid. She was arrested and imprisoned several times during this period for her opposition to the government.

== Civil War ==
Encarnación Fuyola continued her political and propaganda activity after the outbreak of the civil war. She participated in the Madrid Front, and reached the rank of Major. In August 1936 she was appointed spokeswoman for the Child Protection Board in Madrid. In 1937 she published Anti-fascist Women, Work and Organization. She continued to lead the Socorro Rojo, and participated personally and at great risk towards the end of the war in releasing several communists from the concentration camps of Alicante.

== Later years ==
When the civil war ended Fuyola found work as a maid in Pamplona, then made her way to France. She stayed in Le Mans, then traveled to Paris where the Communist Party of France helped her leave for Mexico on the ship Le Havre. She was prevented from disembarking in Cuba because of her Communist affiliation, and reached Veracruz in November 1939. She spent four years in Zamora, Michoacán, Mexico. In 1942 she moved to Mexico City where she was welcomed by Communist comrades. In 1942 the Francoist authorities proscribed Fuyola, who they said was more dangerous and important in the Communist Party than the Pasionaria. In October 1942 her first husband, Luis Sendín, was shot in Madrid.

In Mexico City Fuyola started a new life with a new partner. Her son was born in Mexico. Her home was open to compatriots such as Pedro Checa (1910–1942), Wenceslao Roces (1897–1992) and Antonio Izcaray. She worked as a proofreader and translator of French texts. She maintained her old connections and interests, and wrote for Communist publications such as Mundo Obrero and España. She was active in the Union of Spanish Women, and between 1948 and 1950 was secretary and president. She died in Mexico City on 8 December 1982.

== Sources ==
- Alba, Víctor (1983-01-01). The Communist Party in Spain. Transaction Publishers. ISBN 978-1-4128-1999-2.
- "Fuyola Miret, Encarnación". Parque de la Memoria. Archived from the original on 2015-04-02.
- Mateos, Abdon (2012-09-17). "Fuyola Miret, Encarnación" (in Spanish).
- Rodrigo, Antonina (2014-12-17). Mujeres para la historia (in Spanish). Carena. ISBN 978-84-96357-29-7.
