= Lidia Falcón =

Spanish politician and writer (born 1935)

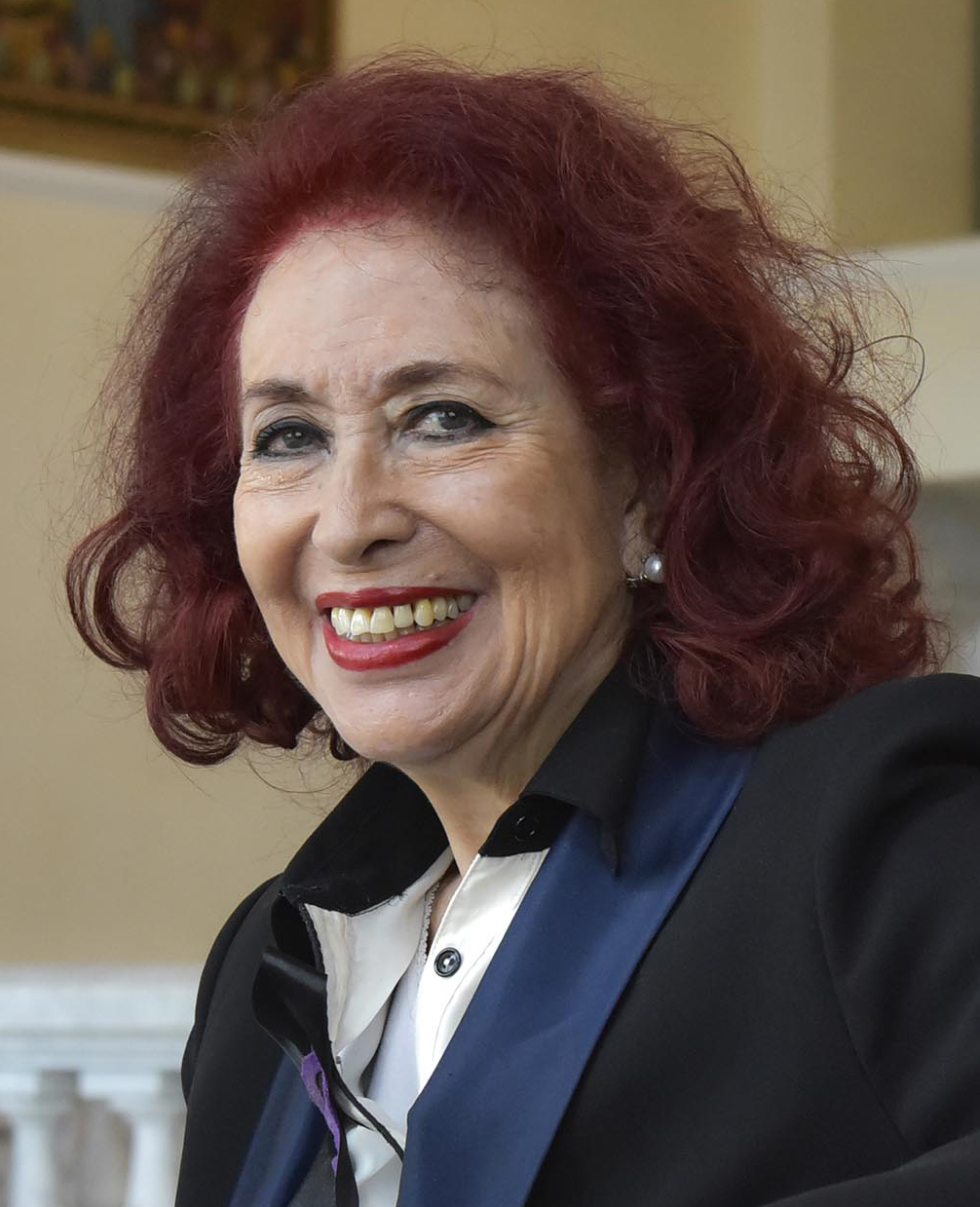
- Lidia Falcón in 2019
- Born: Lidia Falcón O'Neill; 13 December 1935 (age 90); Madrid, Spain
- Education: University of Barcelona
- Occupations: Politician, writer
- Years active: 1947–present
- Political party: Feminist Party of Spain; Unified Socialist Party of Catalonia
- Spouse: Eliseo Bayo
- Children: Regina and Carlos Enrique Bayo
- Parents: César Falcón (father); Enriqueta O'Neill (mother)
- Relatives: Regina de Lamo (grandmother); Carlota O'Neill (aunt)
- Website: www.lidiafalcon.com

Lidia Falcón O'Neill (born 13 December 1935) is a Spanish politician, playwright, and writer. With a degree in law, dramatic art, and journalism, and a PhD in philosophy, she has stood out for her defense of feminism in Spain, especially during the Transition.

She was a member of the Unified Socialist Party of Catalonia (PSUC) and suffered persecution and torture for her political ideas during the Franco dictatorship. In 1976, following Franco's death, she created the Feminist Collective of Barcelona, a feminist magazine Vindicación Feminista, and the publishing house Ediciones de Feminismo. In 1977, she founded the Revolutionary Feminist Organization, from which the Feminist Party of Spain was created. Since 1979, she has directed the magazine Poder y libertad.

== Biography ==
Lidia Falcón O'Neill was born on 13 December 1935 in Madrid, the daughter of Peruvian César Falcón and Spaniard Enriqueta O'Neill (a.k.a. Regina Flavio), both writers and journalists, among other professions. Her parents had met and had an affair when her mother worked in Falcon's theater. Falcon remained married to his wife Irene Falcón, so Enriqueta O'Neill raised Lidia alone. Both her maternal grandmother Regina de Lamo (Nora Avante) and her maternal aunt Carlota O'Neill (Laura de Noves) were writers, so it was not considered unusual when Lidia wrote her first play at age 12.

During the dictatorship, Enriqueta O'Neill worked as a Francoist censor and would maintain a relationship with the Carlist and provincial press secretary – the highest office of censorship in Barcelona – José Bernabé Oliva. He served as Lidia Falcón's godfather. Falcón herself was imprisoned for her political demands. Her mother committed suicide on 17 November 1972 in Barcelona.

== Works ==
=== Theater ===
- Crea fama y échate a dormir, 1947.
- En el futuro, 1957.
- Un poco de nieve blanca, 1958.
- Los que siempre ganan, 1970.
- Con el siglo. Debuted in Barcelona and Athens in 1982.
- Las mujeres caminaron con el fuego del siglo. Barcelona, 1982.
- Parid, parid malditas, 1983. Reprinted in Barcelona in 1986 and 1987.
- Siempre deseé el amor, 1983.
- La hora más oscura, 1987.
- Three Spanish Idiots, Madrid, 1987; Gijón, 1988; Valencia and Bilbao, 1990. Translated into English by S. Cuevas and reprinted in Australia as Voices of Women, 1995.
- Tu único amor, 1990
- Emma, 1992
- Teatro. Cinco obras. Madrid: Vindicación Feminista, 1994.
- Ellas y sus sombras, 1995
- La hora más oscura; Emma; Atardeceres. Madrid: Vindicación Feminista, 2002.
- ¡Vamos a por todas!, Madrid: Asociación de Autores de Teatro, 2002

=== Essay ===
- Sustituciones y fidecomisos. Barcelona: Nereo, 1962.
- Historia del trabajo. Barcelona: Plaza & Janés, 1963.
- Los derechos civiles de la mujer. Barcelona: Nereo, 1963.
- Los derechos laborales de la mujer. Montecorvo, 1964.
- Mujer y sociedad. Barcelona: Fontanella, 1969; Madrid: Vindicación Feminista, 1996.
- La razón feminista. Tomo I. Barcelona: Fontanella, 1981.
- La razón feminista. Tomo II. Barcelona: Fontanella, 1982.
- Violencia contra la mujer. Madrid: Vindicación Feminista, 1991.
- Mujer y poder político. Madrid: Vindicación Feminista, 1992. 2nd ed. Madrid: Kira Edit, 2000.
- La razón feminista. Edición resumida. Madrid: Vindicación Feminista, 1994.
- Trabajadores del mundo ¡Rendios! Madrid: Akal, 1996.
- Amor, sexo y aventura en las mujeres del Quijote. Madrid: Vindicación Feminista, 1997.
- Los nuevos mitos del feminismo. Madrid: Vindicación Feminista, 2001.
- La violencia que no cesa. Recopilación de artículos. Madrid: Vindicación Feminista, 2003.
- Las nuevas españolas. Madrid: La esfera de los libros, 2004.

=== Narrative ===
- Cartas a una idiota española. Barcelona: Dirosa, 1974; Madrid: Vindicación Feminista, 1989.
- Es largo esperar callado. Barcelona: Pomaire, 1975. Madrid: Vindicación Feminista / Hacer, 1984.
- El juego de la piel. Barcelona: Argos Vergara, 1983.
- Rupturas. Barcelona: Fontanella, 1985.
- Camino sin retorno. Barcelona: Antrophos, 1992.
- Postmodernos. Madrid: Libertarias-Prodhufi, 1993.
- Clara. Madrid: Vindicación Feminista, 1993.
- Asesinando el pasado. Madrid: Kira Edit & Vindicación Feminista, 1997.
- Al fin estaba sola. Barcelona: Editorial Montesinos, 2007.
- Una mujer de nuestro tiempo. Barcelona: Editorial Montesinos, 2009.

=== Chronicle ===
- En el infierno. Ser mujer en las cárceles de España. Barcelona: Ediciones de Feminismo, 1977.
- Viernes 13 en la calle del Correo. Barcelona: Planeta, 1981.
- El varón español en búsqueda de su identidad. Barcelona: Plaza & Janés, 1984.
- El alboroto español. Barcelona: Fontanella, 1984.

=== Biography ===
- Los hijos de los vencidos. Barcelona: Pomaire, 1978; Madrid: Vindicación Feminista, 1989.
- Lidia Falcón. Memorias políticas (1959–1999). Barcelona: Planeta, 1999; Madrid: Vindicación Feminista, 2002.
- La vida arrebatada. Barcelona: Anagrama, 2003.

== See also ==
- Cafetería Rolando bombing
