= History of the jet engine =

Jet engine technology is traced as far back as 150 BC. Advancements slowly proceeded, limited by material and aircraft design, and practical applications weren't realized until the early 20th century. Beginning with steam, to modern designs of pulsejets and compressor-based engines, higher energy fuels also helped to refine engines and widen applications. Aircraft applications began serious testing in the late 1930s, and World War II drove design and testing of higher performance engines and aircraft. By the beginning of the 1960s, both civilian and military aircraft were primarily powered by the jet engine.

== Precursors ==
Jet engines can be dated back to the invention of the aeolipile around 150 BC. This device used steam power directed through two nozzles so as to cause a sphere to spin rapidly on its axis. So far as is known, it was not used for supplying mechanical power, and the potential practical applications of this invention were not recognized. It was simply considered a curiosity.

Archytas, the founder of mathematical mechanics, as described in the writings of Aulus Gellius five centuries after him, was reputed to have designed and built the first artificial, self-propelled flying device. This device was a bird-shaped model propelled by a jet of what was probably steam, said to have actually flown some 200 meters.

Ottoman Lagari Hasan Çelebi is said to have taken off in 1633 with what was described to be a cone-shaped rocket and then to have glided with wings into a successful landing, winning a position in the Ottoman army. However, this was essentially a stunt. The problem was that rockets are simply too inefficient at low speeds to be useful for general aviation.

The first working pulsejet was patented in 1906 by Russian engineer V.V. Karavodin, who completed a working model in 1907. The French inventor Georges Marconnet patented his valveless pulsejet engine in 1908, and Ramon Casanova, in Ripoll, Spain patented a pulsejet in Barcelona in 1917, having constructed one beginning in 1913. Robert Goddard invented a pulsejet engine in 1931, and demonstrated it on a jet-propelled bicycle. Engineer Paul Schmidt pioneered a more efficient design based on modification of the intake valves (or flaps), earning him government support from the German Air Ministry in 1933.

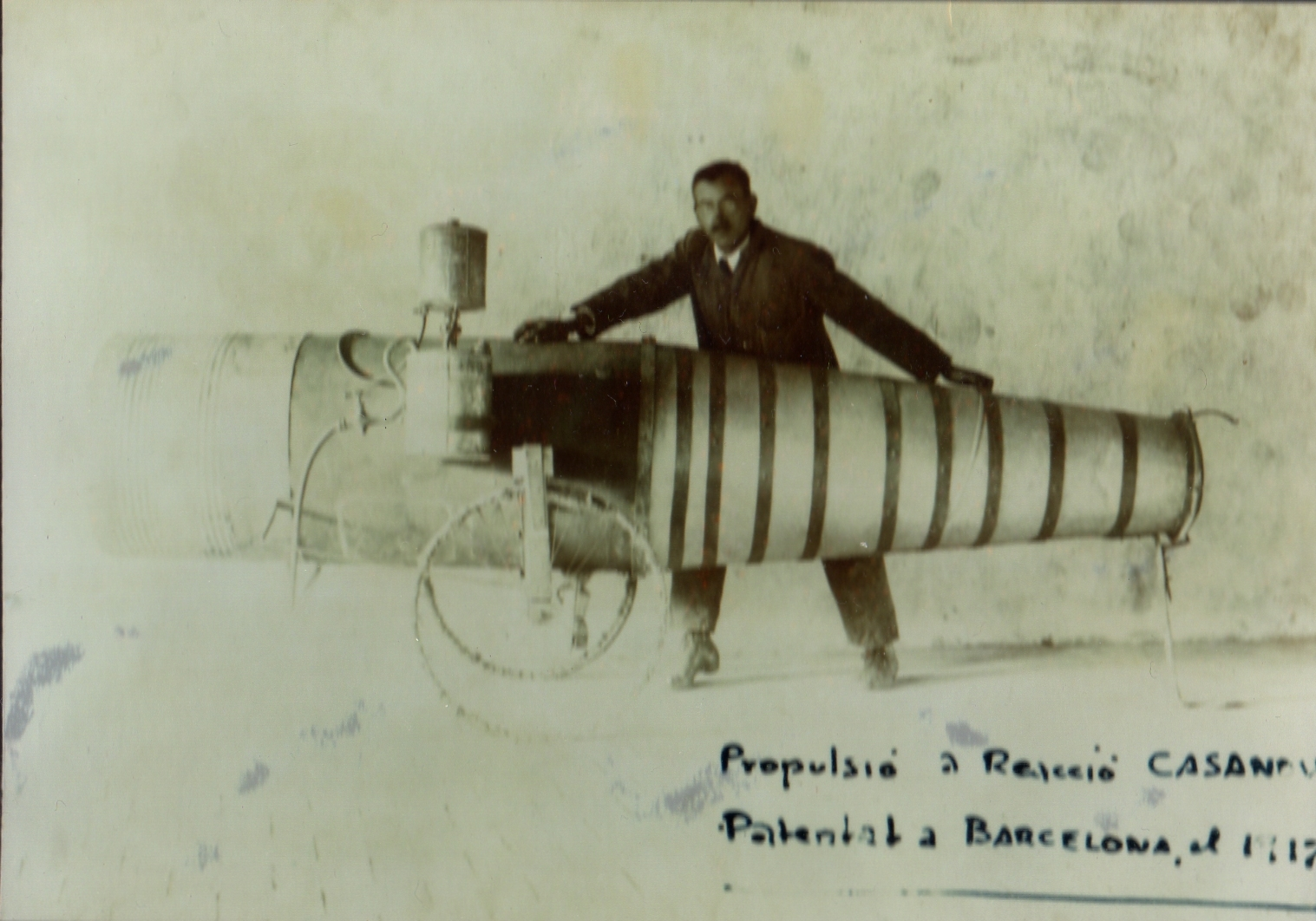
Ramon Casanova and the pulsejet engine he constructed and patented in 1917

Some early attempts at airbreathing jet engines were hybrid designs in which an external power source first compressed air, which was then mixed with fuel and burned for jet thrust. In one such system, called a thermojet by Secondo Campini but more commonly, motorjet, the air was compressed by a fan driven by a conventional piston engine. Examples include the Caproni Campini N.1 and the Japanese Tsu-11 engine intended to power Ohka kamikaze planes towards the end of World War II. None was entirely successful and the CC.2 ended up being slower than the same design with a traditional engine and propeller combination.

In 1913, French aerospace engineer René Lorin patented a design for the world's first ramjet, but it was not possible to develop a working prototype as no existing airplane could achieve sufficient speed for it to operate, and thus the concept remained theoretical.

Engineers in the 1930s realized that the maximum performance of piston engines was limited, as propulsive efficiency declined as blade tips approached the speed of sound. For engine performance to increase beyond this barrier, a way would have to be found to radically improve the design of the piston engine, or a wholly new type of powerplant would have to be developed. Gas turbine engines, commonly called "jet" engines, could do that.

The key to a practical jet engine was the gas turbine, used to extract energy from the engine itself to drive the compressor. The gas turbine was not an idea developed in the 1930s: the patent for a stationary turbine was granted to John Barber in England in 1791. The first gas turbine to successfully run self-sustainingly was built in 1903 by Norwegian engineer Ægidius Elling. Limitations in design and practical engineering and metallurgy prevented such engines reaching manufacture. The main problems were safety, reliability, weight and, especially, sustained operation.

In Hungary, Albert Fonó in 1915 devised a solution for increasing the range of artillery, comprising a gun-launched projectile which was to be united with a ramjet propulsion unit. This was to make it possible to obtain a long range with low initial muzzle velocities, allowing heavy shells to be fired from relatively lightweight guns. Fonó submitted his invention to the Austro-Hungarian Army but the proposal was rejected. In 1928 he applied for a German patent on aircraft powered by supersonic ramjets, and this was awarded in 1932.

The first patent for using a gas turbine to power an aircraft was filed in 1921 by Frenchman Maxime Guillaume. His engine was an axial-flow turbojet.

In 1923, Edgar Buckingham of the US National Bureau of Standards published a report expressing scepticism that jet engines would be economically competitive with prop driven aircraft at the low altitudes and airspeeds of the period: "there does not appear to be, at present, any prospect whatever that jet propulsion of the sort here considered will ever be of practical value, even for military purposes."

Instead, by the 1930s, the piston engine in its many different forms (rotary and static radial, air-cooled and liquid-cooled inline) was the only type of powerplant available to aircraft designers. This was acceptable as long as only low-performance aircraft were required, and indeed all that were available.

== Pre World War II ==
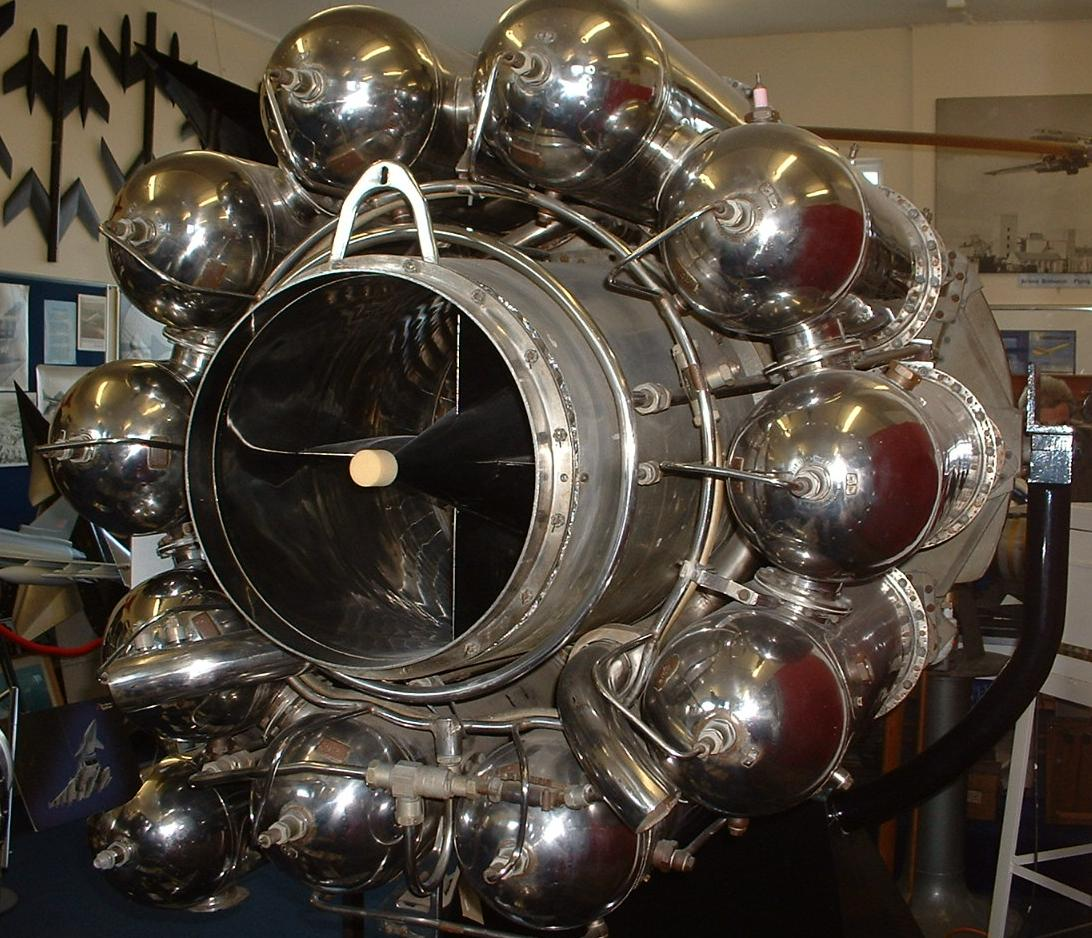
The Whittle W.2/700 engine flew in the Gloster E.28/39, the first British aircraft to fly with a turbojet engine, and the Gloster Meteor.

In 1928, RAF College Cranwell cadet Frank Whittle formally submitted his ideas for a turbo-jet to his superiors. In October 1929, he developed his ideas further. On 16 January 1930 in England, Whittle submitted his first patent (granted in 1932). The patent showed a two-stage axial compressor feeding a single-sided centrifugal compressor. Practical axial compressors were made possible by ideas from A.A. Griffith in a seminal paper in 1926 ("An Aerodynamic Theory of Turbine Design"). Whittle would later concentrate on the simpler centrifugal compressor only, for a variety of practical reasons. Whittle had his first engine running in April 1937. It was liquid-fuelled, and included a self-contained fuel pump. Whittle's team experienced near-panic when the engine would not stop, accelerating even after the fuel was switched off. It turned out that fuel had leaked into the engine and accumulated in pools.

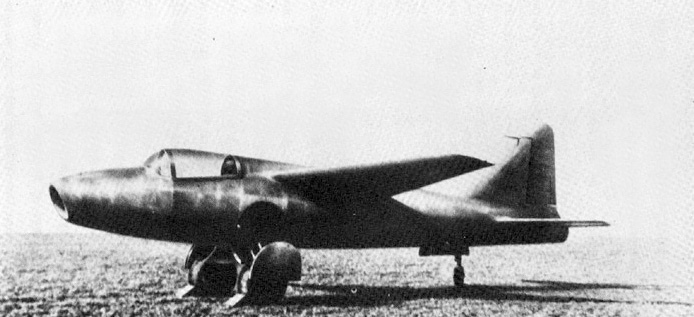
Heinkel He 178, the world's first aircraft to fly purely on turbojet power.

In Spain, pilot and engineer Virgilio Leret Ruiz was granted a patent for a jet engine design in March 1935. Republican president Manuel Azaña arranged for initial construction at the Hispano-Suiza aircraft factory in Madrid in 1936, but Leret was executed months later by Francoist Moroccan troops after unsuccessfully defending his seaplane base on the first days of the Spanish Civil War. His plans, hidden from Francoists, were secretly given to the British embassy in Madrid a few years later by his wife, Carlota O'Neill, upon her release from prison. In 1935, Hans von Ohain started work on a similar design to Whittle's in Germany, and it is often claimed that he was unaware of Whittle's work. Ohain said that he had not read Whittle's patent, and Whittle believed him (Frank Whittle 1907–1996). However, the Whittle patent was in German libraries, and Whittle's son had suspicions that Ohain had read or heard of it.

Years later, it was admitted by von Ohain in his biography that this was so. Author Margaret Conner states ″Ohain's patent attorney happened upon a Whittle patent in the years that the von Ohain patents were being formulated". Von Ohain himself is quoted as saying "We felt that it looked like a patent of an idea" "We thought that it was not seriously being worked on." As Ohain's patent was not filed until 1935, this admission clearly shows that he had read Whittle's patent and had even critiqued it in some detail prior to filing his own patent and some 2 years before his own engine ran.

VON OHAIN: ″Our patent claims had to be narrowed in comparison to Whittle’s because Whittle showed certain things." "When I saw Whittle's patent, I was almost convinced that it had something to do with boundary layer suction combinations. It had a two-flow, dual entrance flow radial flow compressor that looked monstrous from an engine point of view. Its flow reversal looked to us to be an undesirable thing but it turned out that it wasn't so bad after although it gave some minor instability problems.″

His first device was strictly experimental and could only run under external power but he was able to demonstrate the basic concept. Ohain was then introduced to Ernst Heinkel, one of the larger aircraft industrialists of the day, who immediately saw the promise of the design. Heinkel had recently purchased the Hirth engine company, and Ohain and his master machinist Max Hahn were set up there as a new division of the Hirth company. They had their first HeS 1 centrifugal engine running by September 1937. Unlike Whittle's design, Ohain used hydrogen as fuel, supplied under external pressure. Their subsequent designs culminated in the gasoline-fuelled HeS 3 of 1,100 lbf (5 kN), which was fitted to Heinkel's simple and compact He 178 airframe and flown by Erich Warsitz in the early morning of 27 August 1939, from Rostock-Marienehe aerodrome, an impressively short time for development. The He 178 was the world's first turbojet-powered aircraft to fly.

The world's first turboprop was the Jendrassik Cs-1 designed by the Hungarian mechanical engineer György Jendrassik. It was produced and tested in the Ganz factory in Budapest between 1938 and 1942. It was planned to fit to the Varga RMI-1 X/H twin-engined reconnaissance bomber designed by László Varga in 1940 but the program was cancelled. Jendrassik had also designed a small-scale 75 kW turboprop in 1937.

Whittle's engine was starting to look useful and his Power Jets Ltd. started receiving Air Ministry money. In 1941, a flyable version of the engine called the W.1, capable of 1000 lbf (4 kN) of thrust, was fitted to the Gloster E28/39 airframe specially built for it and first flew on 15 May 1941 at RAF Cranwell.

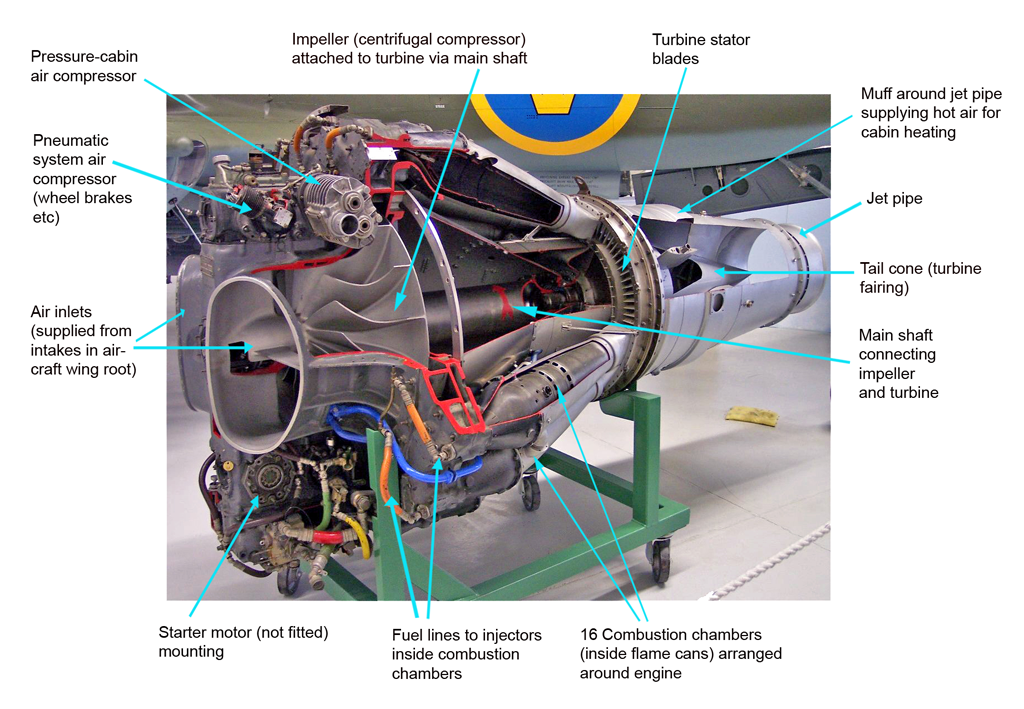
A picture of an early centrifugal engine (DH Goblin II) sectioned to show its internal components.

British aircraft engine designer, Frank Halford, working from Whittle's ideas, developed a "straight through" version of the centrifugal jet; his design became the de Havilland Goblin.

One problem with both of these early designs, which are called centrifugal-flow engines, was that the compressor worked by accelerating air outward from the central intake to the outer periphery of the engine, where the air was then compressed by a divergent duct set-up, converting its velocity into pressure. An advantage of this design was that it was already well understood, having been implemented in centrifugal superchargers, then in widespread use on piston engines. However, given the early technological limitations on the shaft speed of the engine, the compressor needed to have a very large diameter to produce the power required. This meant that the engines had a large frontal area, which made it less useful as an aircraft powerplant due to drag. A further disadvantage of the earlier Whittle designs was that the air flow was reversed through the combustion section and again to the turbine and tailpipe, adding complexity and lowering efficiency. Nevertheless, these types of engines had the major advantages of light weight, simplicity and reliability, and development rapidly progressed to practical airworthy designs.

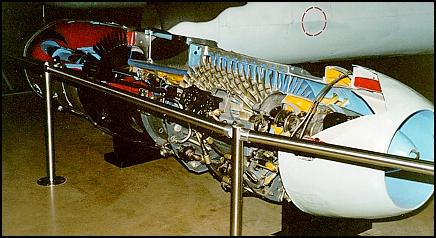
A cutaway of the Junkers Jumo 004 engine.

Austrian Anselm Franz of Junkers' engine division (Junkers Motoren or Jumo) addressed these problems with the introduction of the axial-flow compressor. Essentially, this is a turbine in reverse. Air coming in the front of the engine is blown towards the rear of the engine by a fan stage (convergent ducts), where it is crushed against a set of non-rotating blades called stators (divergent ducts). The process is nowhere near as powerful as the centrifugal compressor, so a number of these pairs of fans and stators are placed in series to get the needed compression. Even with all the added complexity, the resulting engine is much smaller in diameter and thus, more aerodynamic. Jumo was assigned the next engine number in the RLM numbering sequence, 4, and the result was the Jumo 004 engine. After many lesser technical difficulties were solved, mass production of this engine started in 1944 as a powerplant for the world's first jet-fighter aircraft, the Messerschmitt Me 262 (and later the world's first jet-bomber aircraft, the Arado Ar 234). A variety of reasons conspired to delay the engine's availability; this delay caused the fighter to arrive too late to decisively impact Germany's position in World War II. Nonetheless, it will be remembered as the first use of jet engines in service.

The Heinkel-Hirth aviation powerplant firm also tried to create a more powerful turbojet engine, the Heinkel HeS 011 of nearly 3,000 pounds of thrust at full power, very late in the war to improve the propulsion options available to new German military jet aircraft designs, and to improve the performance of existing designs. It used a unique "diagonal" compressor section that combined the features of both centrifugal and axial-flow compressor layouts for turbojet powerplants, but remained on the test bench, with only some nineteen examples ever produced.

In the UK, their first axial-flow engine, the Metrovick F.2, ran in 1941 and was first flown in 1943. Although more powerful than the centrifugal designs at the time, the Ministry considered its complexity and unreliability a drawback in wartime. The work at Metrovick led to the Armstrong Siddeley Sapphire engine which would be built in the US as the J65.

== Post World War II ==
Following the end of the war, the German jet aircraft and jet engines were extensively studied by the victorious allies and contributed to work on early Soviet (see Arkhip Lyulka) and US jet fighters. The legacy of the axial-flow engine is seen in the fact that practically all jet engines on fixed wing aircraft have had some inspiration from this design.

Centrifugal-flow engines have improved since their introduction. With improvements in bearing technology the shaft speed of the engine was increased, greatly reducing the diameter of the centrifugal compressor. The short engine length remains an advantage of this design, particularly for use in helicopters where overall size is more important than frontal area. Also, as their engine components are more robust they are less liable to foreign object damage than axial-flow compressor engines.

Although German designs were more advanced aerodynamically, the combination of simplicity and the lack of requisite rare metals for the necessary advanced metallurgy (such as tungsten, chromium and titanium) for high-stress components such as turbine blades and bearings, etc. meant that the later produced German engines had a short service life and had to be changed after 10–25 hours. British engines were also widely manufactured under license in the US (see Tizard Mission), and were sold to Soviet Russia who reverse engineered them with the Nene going on to power the famous MiG-15. American and Soviet designs, independent axial-flow types, for the most part, would strive to attain superior performance until the 1960s, although the General Electric J47 provided excellent service in the F-86 Sabre in the 1950s.

By the 1950s, the jet engine was almost universal in combat aircraft, with the exception of cargo, liaison, and other specialty types. By this point some of the British designs were already cleared for civilian use, and had appeared on early models like the de Havilland Comet and Avro Canada Jetliner. By the 1960s all large civilian aircraft were also jet powered, leaving the piston engine in such low-cost niche roles such as cargo flights.

The fuel efficiency of turbojet engines was originally worse than piston engines, trading higher speed for more fuel, but the 1970s saw the advent of high bypass engines in jetliners that achieved parity and then greater efficiency at high altitudes, enabling much longer direct flights. Improvements in the turboprop pushed the piston engine out of the mainstream entirely, leaving it serving only the smallest general aviation designs and some use in drone aircraft.

== See also ==
- Aerodynamics
- History of rockets
- History of the internal combustion engine
- Mechanical engineering
