= Regina de Lamo =

Spanish anarchist writer (1870–1947)

- Born: Regina de Lamo Jiménez; 7 September 1870; Úbeda, Spain
- Died: 17 November 1947 (aged 77); Barcelona, Spain
- Other names: Regina Lamo Jiménez; Regina de Lamo Ximénez; Regina Lamo de O'Neill; Nora Avante
- Occupations: Writer, journalist, musician, teacher
- Spouse: Enrique O'Neill Acosta
- Children: Carlota O'Neill; Enriqueta O'Neill
- Relatives: Lidia Falcón (granddaughter); Carlos Enrique Bayo (great-grandson)

Regina de Lamo Jiménez (7 September 1870 – 17 November 1947) was a Spanish intellectual, a very versatile activist until the arrival of the Francoist dictatorship in Spain. She was a pianist, teacher of music and singing, writer, journalist, feminist proponent and activist for women's rights, promoter of the cooperative economic model, defender of syndicalism and anarchism, and propagandist. She signed her writings as Regina Lamo Jiménez, Regina de Lamo Ximénez, Regina Lamo de O'Neill, and under the pseudonym Nora Avante.

== Biography ==
Regina de Lamo Jiménez was born on 7 September 1870 in the Andalusian town of Úbeda, Jaén. Her father, Anselmo de Lamo, and her mother, Micaela Jiménez, were liberals and gave their daughter a complete education. To change to a less traditional environment that would allow Regina and her brother, Carlos, to develop with an education more in keeping with the ideas of the Enlightenment and the Institución Libre de Enseñanza, they moved to Madrid when she was six years old, in 1876.

As a result of her youth studies, Lamo was awarded the First National Piano Prize at the Madrid Royal Conservatory, and later won the first prize at the Conservatoire de Paris. In Madrid, she met her future husband Enrique O'Neill Acosta, a man who was fifteen years older than she, a widowed father, and a Mexican diplomat with Irish ancestry who worked as a teacher. They married and had two daughters, Carlota O'Neill y Lamo in 1905 and Enriqueta O'Neill de Lamo in 1909. After her first years of motherhood which were focused on the babies, Regina resumed her activity in conferences and publications.

During the Spanish Civil War, she worked with Children's Assistance, for the evacuation of the children of the Republican faction. During the war she sought to free her daughter Carlota from prison, as well as her lost granddaughters, while taking care of young Lidia Falcón in Madrid. After the defeat she survived in Barcelona, under the protection of her daughter Enriqueta, writing romance novels under the pseudonym Nora Avante and teaching music, piano, and singing. Among her students was Estrellita Castro. She died in Barcelona on 17 November 1947.

== Professional career ==
Lamo began her professional life as a music and singing teacher, but soon her concern led her to broaden her field of activity to other areas and develop a multidisciplinary career.

She wrote news and essay articles. She was a journalist, rhapsodist, and writer of poetry and theater. In addition, she passionately promulgated birth control and abortion rights, eugenics, euthanasia, and free love. On her feminist side, she was a women's rights activist. She is also known for being a collaborator with Lluís Companys. She is considered a writer of the Generation of '98, recognized after the androcentrist perspective of the time.

She appeared continuously in news stories about social movements in the 1920s and 30s. She was the founder of the first Banco Obrero (Worker's Bank), in Valencia in 1920, and of the Cooperativa Obrera publishing house. Together with Lluís Companys and Amadeu Aragay, she wrote for La Terra magazine.

She traveled continuously throughout the peninsula and to various European countries. She was a speaker at the Regional Congress of Catalonian Cooperatives in 1920, a delegate of the Valencia Popular Credit Cooperative, and the First National Cooperative Congress of 1921, and a participant in the creation of agrarian unions such as L'Unió de Rabassaires i altres cultivadors del Camp de Catalunya (UR) in 1922. As a delegate to the International Labour Organization and the League of Nations, she traveled to Geneva with Clara Campoamor.

Lamo also acted in other areas of interest. Thus, she was co-founder of the Association of Friends of Animals and Plants in Spain. She was ardently in favor of the abolition of bullfighting, and campaigned for the use of breastplates on the horses ridden in these events. At that time the picadors' horses were often gored by bulls, and the unpleasant spectacle was aggravated when, in the same arena, they sewed the horses' intestines back into their abdomens so that the picadors could continue to make use of them.

She collaborated with Hildegart Rodriguez and Irene Falcón at the Marxist feminist publishing house Nosotras. She prefaced Federica Montseny's book Escrits politic and also Las reivindicaciones femeninas by Santiago Valentí Camp in 1927. She took care to publish the final editions of the works of Rosario de Acuña, a famous writer and companion of her brother Carlos de Lamo Jiménez, of whom she became a good friend.

== Selected works ==
- El ensayo ¿Cómo se mide la inteligencia infantil? Ed. Eiocos, 1923
- Prologue of Escrits Politics by Federica Montseny, Ed. Luís Romero, Madrid, 1925
- La Colegiata, La Novela Roja Collection, No. 4, Ed. Pegaso, 1926
- Prologue of Las reivindicaciones femeninas by Santiago Valentí Camp, 1927
- Biografía: El Vals eterno de Juan Strauss, 1942
