= Juan Seguí Almuzara =

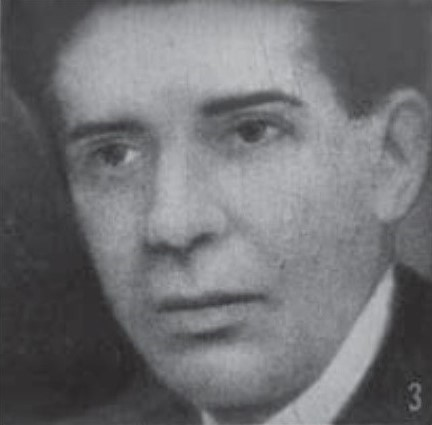
- Born: 1885; Figueres, Spain
- Died: 1936; Feria, Spain
- Occupations: military, entrepreneur
- Known for: conspirator

Juan Seguí Almuzara (1885–1936) was a Spanish military officer who ascended to the rank of lieutenant colonel. In the 1910s he served mostly in Morocco, while in the 1920s he was a military attaché in Paris and Brussels. However, he is known mostly for his engagement in the July 1936 coup. In Melilla he emerged as one of few key leaders of the conspiracy and played a vital role in rebel takeover of power in the area.

== Youth ==
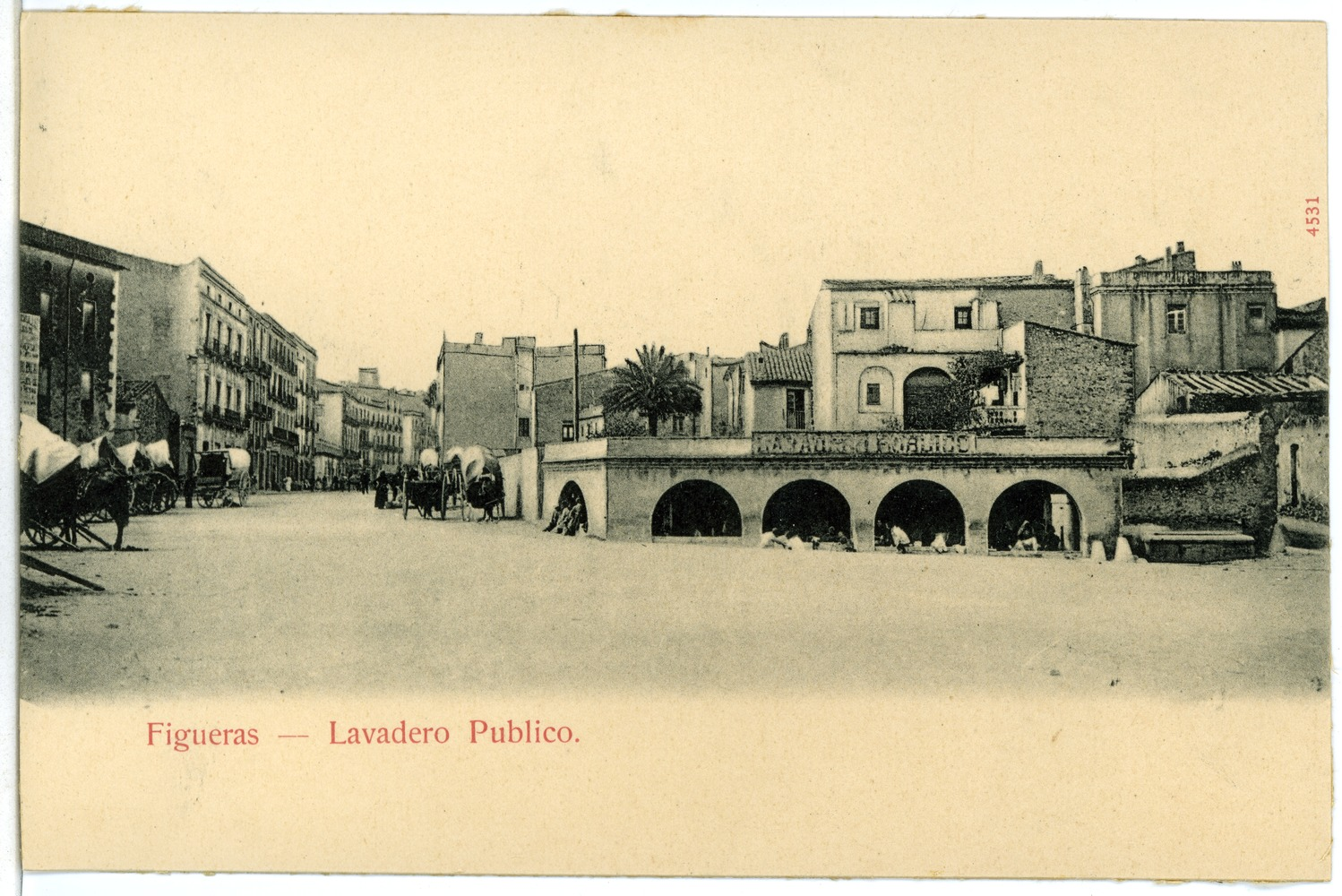
Figueres, around 1903

Segui's paternal family was related to the province of Alicante. His father, Juan Segui Verdú (born 1841), originated from the hamlet of Tollos and like many in the family, he opted for a military career. In the mid-1880s he served in the rank of a captain of infantry and was posted to Catalonia; his new unit was the 18. Infantry Battalion based in Lérida, though Segui Verdú was assigned to its company garrisoning the St. Fernando base in Figueres. At the time he was married to María Almuzara Alonso (born 1850), the native of Huesca; in the mid-1890s he was promoted to comandante and in the early 20th century he would retire at this rank.

Juan spent his childhood in Figueres and Lérida. Though growing up in the Catalan environment, he spoke Spanish as his native tongue; it is not clear what schools he frequented. When adolescent, he decided to follow in the footsteps of his father; in 1899 he entered a preparatory military school (unclear where) and in 1900 he successfully took entry exams to Academia de Infantería in Toledo. Following the regular curriculum, he graduated as segundo teniente in 1903; among 145 graduates, he was within the best 15. His first military assignment was to the 1. Mountain Battalion, stationed in the Navarrese town of Estella.

== Military career ==
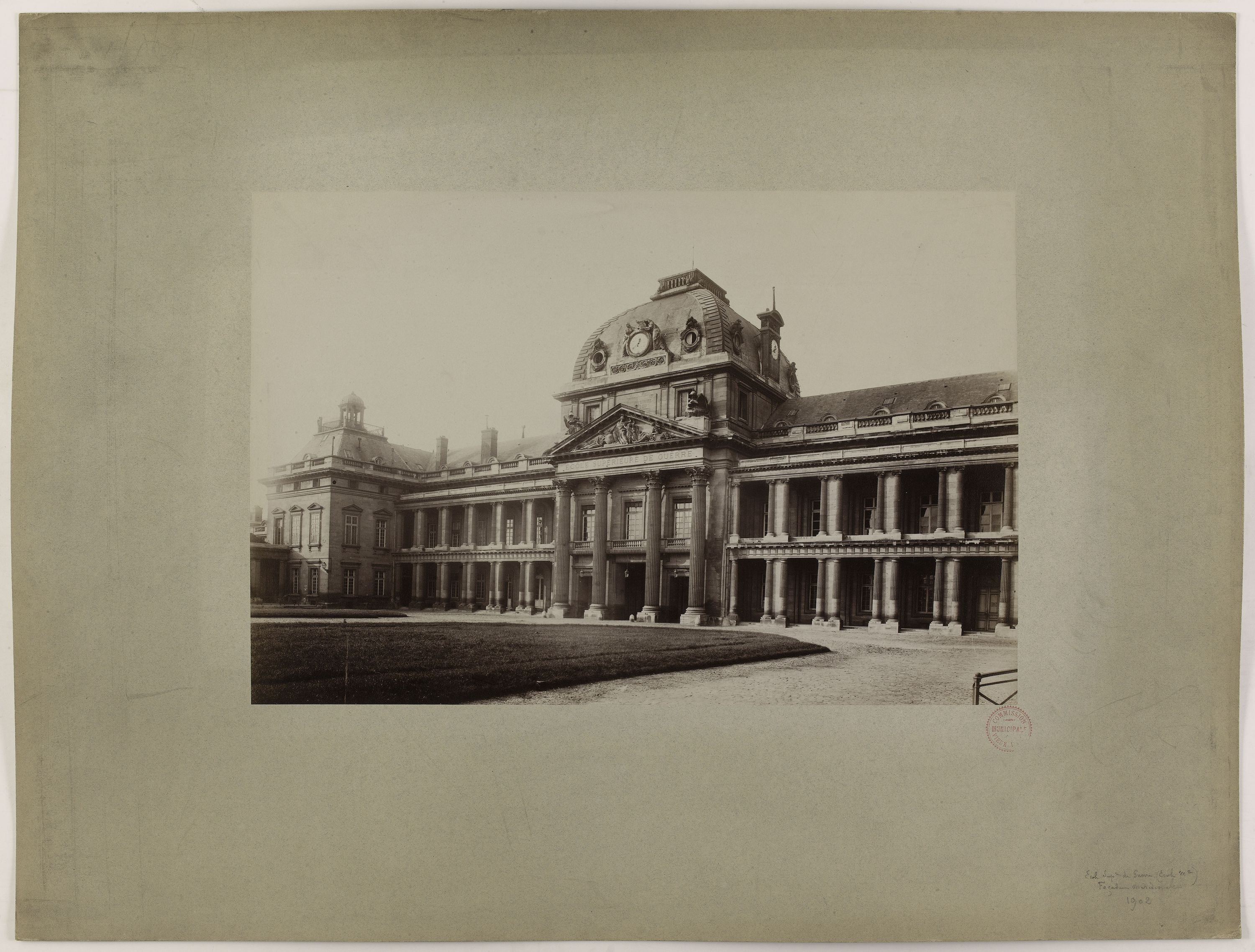
École supérieure de guerre

No later than in 1905 and already as primer teniente Segui was transferred to Ceuta in the Protectorate of Morocco, where he assumed duties in the local staff. In 1906 he entered École supérieure de guerre in Paris, in 1909 promoted to captain. He co-translated large parts of Clausewitz' Vom Kriege, published in Madrid in 1908. Upon completion of the curriculum in 1911 he was already a comandante (major). He was again posted to Morocco, this time to comandancia general de Melilla. In 1914 and in Figueres he married a local girl, Nicole Valentine Denis Moreau (they would not have children). Segui kept serving in Melilla, in the mid-1910s in local general staff and at the turn of the decades in Policía Indígena, local Moroccan public order force.

In 1921 latest Segui was back in France, following additional courses in École supérieure. This commenced his long spell on foreign assignements, first as agregado militar in Paris, and in the mid-1920s – already as teniente coronel – in Brussels; he was also acredited for the Netherlands and Switzerland. At this role he mixed with the world of diplomacy, though was mainly busy with military tasks, e.g. appearing as observer at various maneouvres or trials. In 1930 he was recalled to Spain and assigned to 1. Region in Madrid. In 1931 he took advantage of the military reform, pursued by Manuel Azaña, and opted for retirement.

== Conspirator ==
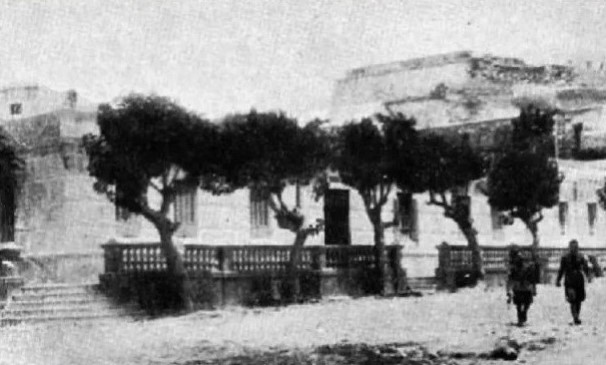
Sección de Límites, Melilla

In 1932, as a 47-year-old retiree with generous pension, Segui returned to Melilla. He launched his own retail trade business, though its exact nature is not clear. Because of his position in the local world of commerce, familiarity with numerous highly positioned military in the area, but principally due to his previous spell in Paris, he emerged as a personality in the local societé. In 1935 he was also nominated interventor regional; a peculiar local role, initially reserved for the military, in the early 1930s it was a civilian position, related to performing auxiliary administrative tasks, especially with regard to local indigenous structures.

In the spring of 1936 Segui served as a link between local military and civilian conspirators. Between March and June he travelled to Pamplona, discussing details with general Mola; he emerged among key plotters in Melilla or even “the brain” behind the plot. On July 17 he and other conspirators were surrounded by Guardia Civil in the Sección de Límites building, when distributing weapons. A hastily assembled Foreign Legion detachment arrived at the scene and overpowered the civiles; this effectively commenced the coup. Few hours later Segui stormed, pistol in hand, into the room where military conspirators tried to convince general Romerales to resign power; having pointed the gun at the general, Segui forced him to give up.

== Rebel ==
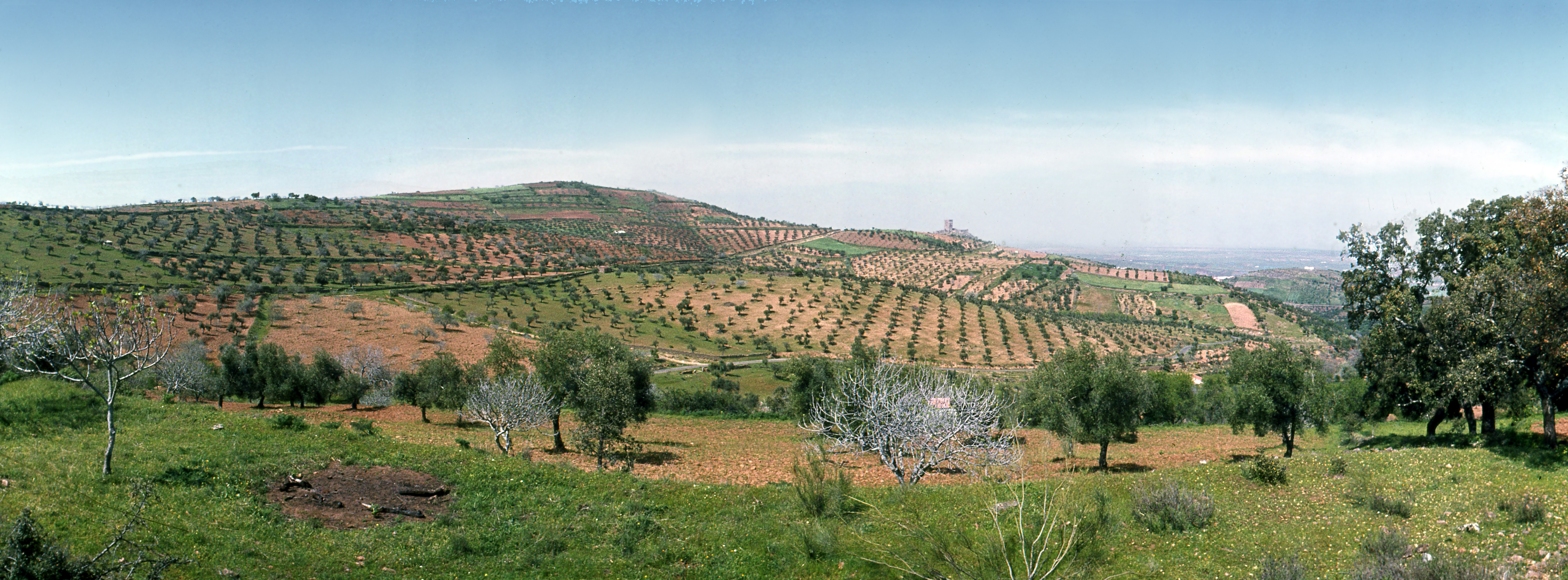
countryside near Feria

Following takeover of Melilla, Segui entered the informal local junta, headed by colonel Solans. According to non-verified sources, on August 2 he was nominated head of the Melilla general staff. It is not clear whether he played any role in repressive actions, carried out by the rebels in the area. At unspecified time in early or mid-August he transferred to the peninsula; allegedly he was tasked by Queipo de Llano with buildup of Policía Montada, a vigilante-type militia, supposed to consolidate rebel rule in the freshly seized parts of Extremadura.

On August 18, 1936, Segui with few other officers was travelling in a car, on its route from Seville to Badajóz. In the town of Santa Marta de Los Barros, thought to be under the rebel control, they were suddenly approached by loyalist militia. The vehicle turned back and tried to flee, but it was soon damaged by enemy fire. The rebels abandoned the car and pursued by the loyalists, sought shelter in the countryside; they hid in a farmhouse near Feria, offering money to the owner. However, the latter denounced them to approaching militiamen. Segui and his companions either died in combat or surrendered, but were executed shortly afterwards.

== Epilogue ==
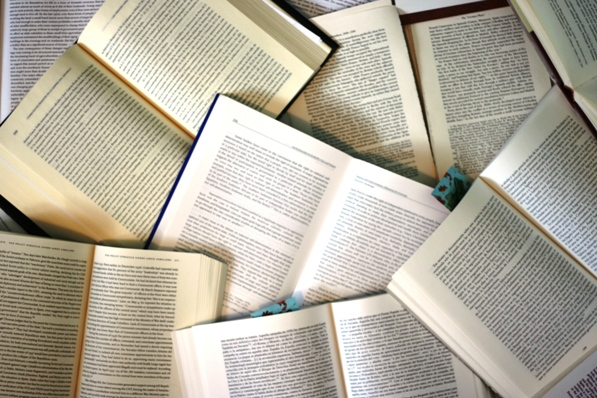

The widow was eligible for extraordinary pension, as Segui died when in service; it was granted already in 1938. The question of heritage, claimed by the widow and the sister, Pilar Seguí Almuzara, was settled by the court in 1940. At unspecified time during early Francoism a major street in Melilla, leading to Plaza de España, was named "calle teniente coronel Segui". Until the late 1960s in anniversary articles published in mid-July some local newspapers used to mention Segui among those who first rose to arms, at times as " verdadero cerebro del Alzamiento en Melilla". In 1957 the widow was admitted at a private audience by Franco. Segui made it to history books, from Historia de la cruzada española (1940) by Arraras to The Spanish Civil War (1961) by Thomas.

Until today Segui is briefly mentioned in scores of historiographic works focusing either on the coup in Morocco or on early days of the civil war, at times falsely as "jefe de la Falange en Melilla", though usually among "principales dirigentes de la conspiración en Melilla" or similar. The street in Melilla bore his name until the early 21. century; following efforts on part of local activists, in 2013 the local ayuntamiento renamed it to "Avenida de democracia"; some cheered that "el nombre del asesino Tte. Coronel Seguí desapareciera del callejero". Segui was among protagonists of the novel Melilla 1936 (2022) by Luis María Cazorla Prieto. He was dedicated a brief monographic article in 2023.

== See also ==
- July 1936 military uprising in Melilla
