= Feminist Party of Spain =

Spanish political party

Feminist Party of Spain Partido Feminista de España
- Secretary-General: Lidia Falcón
- Founder: Lidia Falcón
- Founded: 1979; 1981 (Officially registered)
- Ideology: Socialist feminism Republicanism; Gender-critical feminism Radical feminism Anti-capitalism
- Political position: Far-left
- National affiliation: United Left (2015–2020)

Website
- partidofeminista.es

Feminist Party of Spain (in Spanish: Partido Feminista de España, PFE) is a feminist political party which operates in Spain. It was founded in 1979 by the feminist, anti-fascist, and communist activist Lidia Falcón.

== History ==
In 1983, the 1st congress of the party was held in Barcelona, where the executive committee was elected. The members of it were: Lidia Falcón, Carmen Sarmiento, Maria Encarna Sanahuja, Mercedes Izquierdo, Montserrat Fernández Casido, Pilar Altamira, Siurana Elvira, Isabel Marin, and Maria Angeles Piquero.

In the European Parliament elections of 1999, the party promoted the creation of the Confederation of Feminist Organizations, that won 28,901 votes (0.14%).

During its second congress, held from 25 to 26 July 2015, PFE decided to join United Left to participate in general elections of that year within the strategy of "popular unity".

It was expelled from the United Left on 22 February 2020 over the party's position on transgender people, with the organisation citing "repeated statutory breaches and the holding of positions contrary to those approved in the IU bodies".
