= World Committee Against War and Fascism =

Pacifist organisation

- French: Comité mondial contre la guerre et le Fascisme; German: Weltkomitee gegen Krieg und Faschismus
- Predecessor: World Committee against Imperialist War, European Workers' Anti-Fascist Union
- Formation: August 1933
- Type: International non-governmental organization
- Purpose: "Co-ordinate the actions in the whole world against war and fascism"
- Headquarters: Berlin, then Paris
- Official language: French, English, German

The World Committee Against War and Fascism was an international organization sponsored by the Communist International, that was active in the struggle against Fascism in the 1930s. During this period Adolf Hitler came to power in Germany, Italy invaded Ethiopia and the Spanish Civil War broke out. Although some of the women involved were Communists whose priority was preventing attacks on the Soviet Union, many prominent pacifists with different ideologies were members or supporters of the committee. The World Committee sponsored subcommittees for Women and Students, and national committees in countries that included Spain, Britain, Mexico and Argentina. The Women's branches were particularly active and included feminist leaders such as Gabrielle Duchêne of France, Sylvia Pankhurst of Britain and Dolores Ibárruri of Spain.

== Background ==
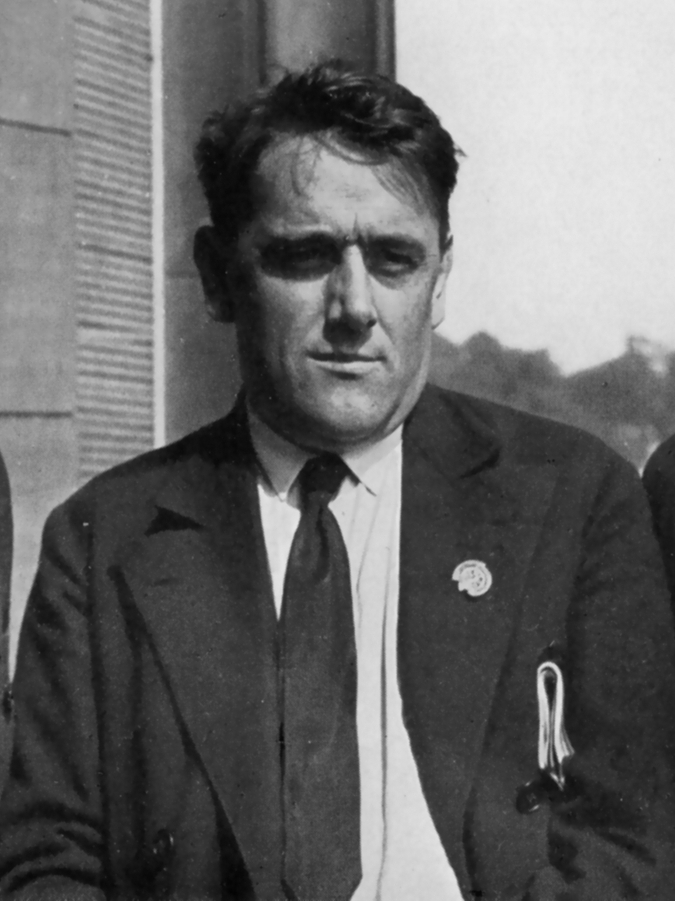
Willi Münzenberg, who orchestrated creation of the World Committee against Imperialist War

Japan conquered Manchuria in 1932 and support for the Nazis was growing in Germany that year, making the Soviet Union fear encirclement and attack by the capitalist powers. The German Communist Willi Münzenberg had founded the League against Imperialism in 1927, but it had collapsed in 1931. Münzenberg organized the World Congress Against Imperialist War in Amsterdam in late August 1932. He was careful to avoid including any Russian names in the advance notices other than Maxim Gorky, head of the convening committee. The congress was advertised as the World Congress Against Imperialist War in Communist publications, but simply as the World Congress Against War elsewhere. Romain Rolland and Henri Barbusse issued the invitations.

The World Congress Against War was held in Amsterdam on 27–29 August 1932, and was attended by more than 2,000 delegates from 27 countries. The majority of the delegates were not Communists. However, many belonged to organizations associated with the Communist party, or were known to be sympathetic to Russia. Most of the discussion was about the need to protect the Soviet Union. The Amsterdam meeting founded the World Committee against Imperialist War. Willi Münzenberg was the force behind organizing the World Committee, which at first was based in Berlin. Münzenberg managed to convince many prominent pacifists to join the committee. In addition to Barbusse, Rolland and Gorky the members included Albert Einstein, Heinrich Mann, Bertrand Russell, Havelock Ellis, Theodore Dreiser, John Dos Passos, Upton Sinclair and Sherwood Anderson.

Romain Rolland criticized the control Münzenberg assumed over the committee and was against basing it in Berlin. The Executive Committee of the Communist International was also uncomfortable with Münzenberg's views and replaced him by Georgi Dimitrov. Early the next year Adolf Hitler was appointed Chancellor of Germany and the World Committee had to move its headquarters to Paris. Dimitrov was jailed on a charge of responsibility for the Reichstag fire, and Münzenberg again assumed the leadership.

== Foundation ==
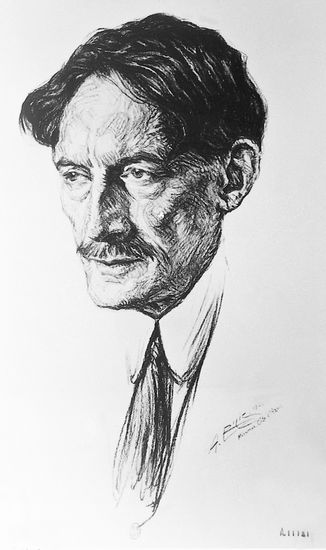
Henri Barbusse, one of the founding members

The European Workers' Anti-Fascist Union was formed in June 1933 at the European Anti-Fascist Workers' Congress, held in the Salle Pleyel in Paris. This organization merged with the World Committee in August 1933 to become the Joint World Committee against Imperialist War and Fascism, later shortened to the World Committee against War and Fascism. The committee was called "Amsterdam–Pleyel" after the founding meeting places. The combined organization was led by Henri Barbusse, André Gide and André Malraux as co-chairs. Two German communists, Alfred Kurella and Albert Norden, looked after routine operations.

The World Committee against War and Fascism defined its goal as "to co-ordinate the actions in the whole world against war and fascism." It called on "the hand and brain workers in all parties, the trade unions of all tendencies, the peasants and members of the middle classes, the youth and women." The World Committee's close ties to communism were common knowledge, but the Committee was able to attract support outside this movement.

== Activities ==
In 1933 and 1934 the World Committee organized congresses to coordinate the anti-fascist activities of youth, women and students. The World Students' Committee against War and Fascism was the offshoot of one congress, as was the World Committee of Women against War and Fascism. On 27 April 1934 the heads of Communist parties in Europe met in Moscow where they received fresh directions from the Comintern. After August 1934 the World Committee was supported by these parties and by Comintern. With this funding, it was able to sponsor new organizations against war and fascism. It founded the periodicals Vendredi in France, Futuro in Mexico and Claridad in Buenos Aires.

In 1939 the committee's letterhead showed Henri Barbusse as Founder, Romain Rolland as Honorary President, and Francis Jourdain as secretary general. The council included Paul Langevin, Jean Longuet and André Malraux of France, Sir Norman Angell of England, Heinrich Mann of Germany, Harry F. Ward, Sherwood Anderson and John dos Passos of the United States and A. A. MacLeod of Canada. Francis Jourdain invited Professor J. B. S. Haldane to attend a great International Conference in Defence of Peace and Humanity that was to be held in Paris on 13–14 May 1939. Haldane expressed his support but declined the invitation.

=== Women's World Committee ===
The French feminist Gabrielle Duchêne (Note: Gabrielle Duchêne had founded the French section of the Women's International League for Peace and Freedom (WILPF, Ligue internationale des femmes pour la paix et la liberté) 1919, and directed it until her death in 1954.) was sponsored by Romain Rolland and Henri Barbusse in the Amsterdam congress. She became one of the secretaries of the World Committee. In 1934 Gabrielle Duchêne organized the World Assembly of Women, and chaired its World Committee of Women against War and Fascism (CMF: Comité mondial des femmes contre la guerre et le fascisme). British Sponsors of the women's committee included non-Communists such as Charlotte Despard, Sylvia Pankhurst, (Note: Sylvia Pankhurst was a founding member of the anti-fascist Friends of Italian Freedom, the Italian Information Bureau and the Women's International Matteotti Committee. Later she became a vice-president of the League for the Boycott of Aggressor Nations and the British Non-Sectarian Anti-Nazi Council.) Ellen Wilkinson, Vera Brittain and Storm Jameson. The Women's World Committee published its manifesto in 1934.

In 1935 the World Committee of Women Against War and Fascism pooled resources with the League against Imperialism and the Negro Workers Union (UTN: Union des Travailleurs Nègres) to promote freedom of speech and to end violence in the colonies of France and other European powers. Denise Moran Savineau (Note: The Governor-General of French West Africa, Jules Marcel de Coppet (1881–1968), commissioned Denise Moran Savineau to conduct an official survey of the condition of women in the colony during 1937-38. She produced a thorough and extremely critical report that documented widespread neglect by the authorities and oppressive working conditions.) presided over a meeting of the Women's Committee which was addressed by the communist Stéphane Rosso. The Women's World Committee was active in support of the International Committee for the Defense of the Ethiopian People, which held its first meeting on 2 September 1935 before the Italian invasion of Ethiopia was launched in October 1935. The Women's World Committee held another congress in Paris in 1937.

=== Spain ===
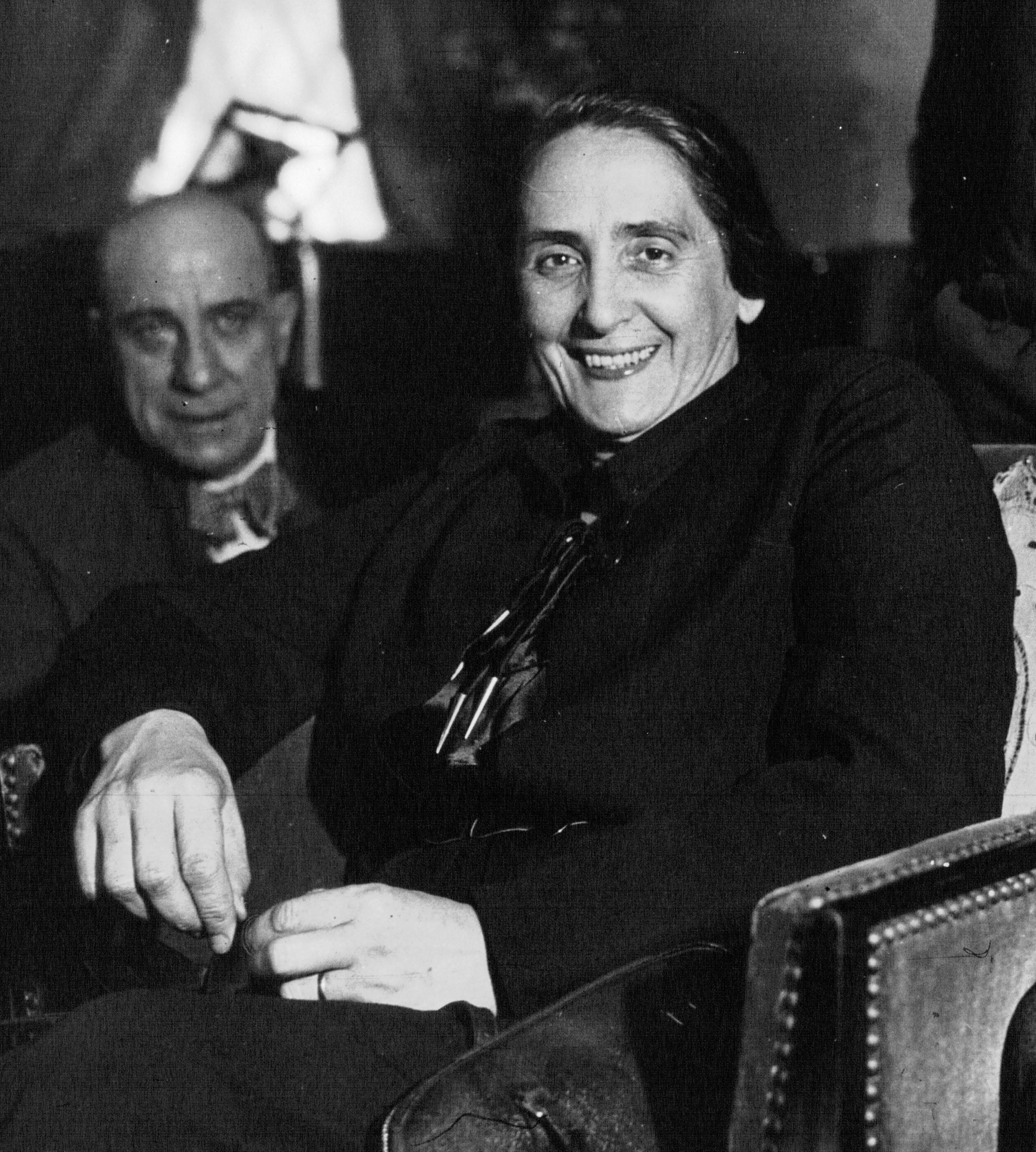
Dolores Ibárruri of Spain in 1936

In mid-1933 a delegate of the World Committee visited women's groups in Spain to investigate the potential for a Spanish women's committee aligned with the World Committee. Dolores Ibárruri told her "she would have no difficulty with communist women." The French delegate said she wanted to also interview Socialist women, but did not have time. The Spanish Committee of Women against War and Fascism was created with a committee controlled by the Communist Party of Spain (PCE). In August 1934 the Spanish committee sent a delegation to the World Congress of Women against War and Fascism in Paris. Dolores Ibárruri led the group, which included two Republicans and two Communists, Encarnación Fuyola and Irene Falcón. The Spanish committee was dissolved in October 1934 during the repression that followed the Asturian miners' strike.

On 13 August 1936 the World Committee against War and Fascism organized a general European conference in Paris to arrange support for the Republican faction in the Spanish Civil War (1936–39).

=== Britain ===
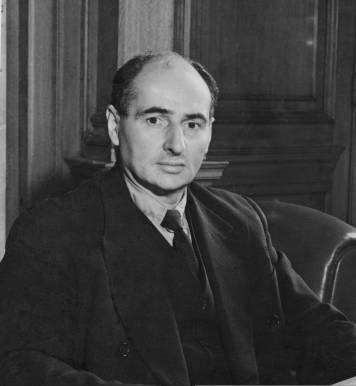
John Strachey of the British section

Oswald Mosley's British Union of Fascists (BUF) organized a large rally at the Olympia hall in London in June 1934. A counter-demonstration was organized, and the rally turned into a fight in which many were injured. A Committee for Coordinating Anti-Fascist Activities was formed, with John Strachey as secretary, sponsored by the World Committee Against War and Fascism (Amsterdam-Pleyel). When the BUF staged another demonstration of 3,000 Fascists in Hyde Park, London on 9 September 1934, Strachey's committee organized a major counter-demonstration by 20,000 anti-Fascists.

The British Section of Women Against War and Fascism published a "Women's Charter" that demanded the right for married women to work and for local birth control clinics before calling for all Fascist organizations to be dissolved and supporting the call for total disarmament made by the Soviet Union. The left-wing militant Melita Norwood pushed through a resolution by the Association of Women Clerks and Secretaries under which the union would work in association with the Women's World Committee. The Six Point Group and the National Union of Women Teachers were also affiliated to the British section of the Women's World Committee. The British Labour Party, led from 1935 by Clement Attlee, proscribed the Committee as a Communist front.

The British section of the Women's World Committee Against War and Fascism published the monthly magazine Women To-day. Its target audience were "thinking" women who were interested in world affairs and social issues, although it included some articles on domestic subjects. The British section called for armaments factories to be converted to making socially useful goods. This caused serious internal tension when the left-leaning members began to support the Republicans in the Spanish Civil War. The Women's World Committee helped British women to work to help women in Spain during the civil war. The British section of the Women's Committee dissolved soon after the start of World War II (1939–45).

=== America ===
The American delegates to the 1932 Amsterdam congress established the American Committee for Struggle Against War, soon afterwards renamed the American League Against War and Fascism. This group was backed by many prominent American intellectuals, and claimed millions of members. Most of the American pacifists who supported the League understood its close connection to the Communists and goal of protecting Soviet Russia, but were willing to tolerate this given the growing risk of war.

Ella Reeve Bloor (1862-1951) of the American Communist Party attended the women's congress in Paris in 1934 and was elected to the World Committee. She became a member of the National Executive Committee of the American League Against War and Fascism, and in this role tried to bring together the labor and pacifist movements. Clara Shavelson Lemlich was an organizer for the American League Against War and Fascism who often spoke against nuclear weapons and the arms race. After she visited the Soviet Union in 1949 her passport was revoked, and in 1951 she was called to testify before the House Un-American Activities Committee.

In Canada, the Communist Party of Canada formed the Canadian League Against War and Fascism as a popular front against fascism.

== Sources ==
- Alba, Víctor (1983-01-01). The Communist Party in Spain. Transaction Publishers. ISBN 978-1-4128-1999-2.
- Arnesen, Eric (2007). Encyclopedia of U.S. Labor and Working-class History. Taylor & Francis. ISBN 978-0-415-96826-3.
- Barberis, Peter; McHugh, John; Tyldesley, Mike (2000). Encyclopedia of British and Irish Political Organizations: Parties, Groups and Movements of the 20th Century. A&C Black. ISBN 978-0-8264-5814-8.
- Boittin, Jennifer Anne (2010-06-01). Colonial Metropolis: The Urban Grounds of Anti-Imperialism and Feminism in Interwar Paris. U of Nebraska Press. ISBN 978-0-8032-2993-8.
- Burke, David (2008). The Spy who Came in from the Co-op: Melita Norwood and the Ending of Cold War Espionage. Boydell & Brewer Ltd. ISBN 978-1-84383-422-9.
- Carle, Emmanuelle (July 2004). "Gabrielle Duchêne et la recherche d'une autre route". Archives du Féminisme (in French) (7). Archived from the original on 2019-06-06.
- Ceplair, Larry (1987). Under the Shadow of War: Fascism, Anti-Fascism, and Marxists, 1918-1939. Columbia University Press. ISBN 978-0-231-06532-0.
- Davies, Thomas (2014-10-10). NGOs: A New History of Transnational Civil Society. Oxford University Press. ISBN 978-0-19-025750-7.
- Dreyfus, Michel (1985). "Le fonds féministe à la BDIC". Matériaux pour l'histoire de notre temps (in French). 1 (1): 21–23. doi:10.3406/mat.1985.403982.
- Jackson, Angela (2003-09-02). British Women and the Spanish Civil War. Routledge. ISBN 978-1-134-47107-2.
- Jourdain, Francis; Haldane, J.B.S. (1939). "Letters between the World Committee Against War and Fascism and J B S Haldane". University College London.
- Lewy, Guenter (1990-09-13). The Cause That Failed : Communism in American Political Life: Communism in American Political Life. Oxford University Press. p. 168. ISBN 978-0-19-987429-3.
- Liddington, Jill (1989). The Road to Greenham Common: Feminism and Anti-militarism in Britain Since 1820. Syracuse University Press. ISBN 978-0-8156-2539-1.
- Offen, Karen M. (2000). European Feminisms, 1700-1950: A Political History. Stanford University Press. ISBN 978-0-8047-3420-2.
- Oldfield, Sybil (2003-12-16). This Working-Day World: Women's Lives And Culture(s) In Britain, 1914-1945. CRC Press. ISBN 978-0-203-45137-3.
- Pankhurst, Richard (2003). Sylvia Pankhurst: Counsel for Ethiopia : a Biographical Essay on Ethiopian, Anti-fascist and Anti-colonialist History, 1934-1960. Tsehai Publishers. ISBN 978-0-9723172-3-8.
- Payne, Stanley G. (2008-10-01). The Spanish Civil War, the Soviet Union, and Communism. Yale University Press. ISBN 978-0-300-13078-2.
- Rabinbach, Anson; Moyn, Samuel (2013-01-15). "Paris, Capital of Anti-Fascism". In Warren Breckman; Peter E. Gordon; A. Dirk Moses (eds.). The Modernist Imagination: Intellectual History and Critical Theory. Berghahn Books. ISBN 978-0-85745-418-8.
- Thomas, Martin (2005). The French Empire Between the Wars: Imperialism, Politics and Society. Manchester University Press. ISBN 978-0-7190-6518-7.
