= Carlota O'Neill =

Spanish writer and journalist

- Born: Carlota Alejandra Regina Micaela O'Neill y de Lamo; 27 March 1905; Madrid, Spain
- Died: 20 June 2000 (aged 95); Caracas, Venezuela
- Other names: Carlota Lionell; Laura de Noves
- Occupations: Journalist, writer
- Spouse: Virgilio Leret Ruiz
- Children: María Gabriela, Carlota
- Parents: Enrique O'Neill Acosta (father); Regina de Lamo (mother)
- Relatives: Enriqueta O'Neill (sister); Lidia Falcón (niece)

Carlota Alejandra Regina Micaela O'Neill y de Lamo (27 March 1905 – 20 June 2000) was a Spanish writer and journalist. Her husband, Captain Virgilio Leret Ruiz, was executed after opposing the July 1936 military uprising in Melilla which led to the Civil War. She spent three years and nine months in prison and some years later went into Venezuela and Mexico. She also wrote under the pseudonyms Carlota Lionell and Laura de Noves.

== Biography ==
=== Early years ===
Carlota Alejandra Regina Micaela O'Neill y Lamo was born on 27 March 1905 in Madrid, the daughter of Enrique O'Neill Acosta, a Mexican diplomat of Irish descent, and Regina de Lamo y Jiménez (also known as Nora Avante), a Spanish writer, pianist, passionate defender of unionism and of cooperativism, and a collaborator of Lluís Companys. She had one sister, Enriqueta O'Neill (known by the pseudonym Regina Flavio), also a writer, as well as several half-brothers from a previous marriage of her father's. She was the aunt of the politician and writer Lidia Falcón O'Neill. Her uncle Carlos Lamo y Jiménez was the sentimental companion of the writer and journalist Rosario de Acuña.

Her family moved to Barcelona, where she met Virgilio Leret, a soldier. She had two children with him, Maria Gabriela (Mariela) and Carlota (Loti). Carlota and Virgilio were married when they were expecting their second daughter, with the sole purpose of protecting the legal status of their children. A feminist and leftist, Carlota O'Neill wrote dramatic works (Nosotros, with the Central Proletarian Theater; her work Al Rojo premiered in Madrid on 11 February 1933) and founded and directed the magazine Nosotras in 1934.

=== Spanish Civil War ===
In July 1936 O'Neill was in Melilla with her husband and daughters, since Leret was the Head of the Air Force for the Eastern Zone of Morocco and of El Atalayón hydroplane base at Melilla. The insurgents overcame Leret's resistance at the base and assassinated him, although his wife would not learn of this until later. After the attack, Carlota O'Neill was arrested on 22 July 1936 and separated from her daughters. She was tried by a military court 18 months after her arrest, and because the facts of the accusation against her were not proven, the judge decreed that the case be dismissed.

She was notified of the decision on 21 August 1936; nevertheless, she was not given her freedom. As it appears on page 42 of the case file, by resolution of 26 August 1936, dictated by judge Luis Anel y Ladrón de Guevara, "at the proposal of the Purification Commission I have agreed to keep her detained by the government for now." O'Neill was subjected to a military tribunal and was sentenced to six years in prison for the crime of insulting the Army.

On 18 March 1938, when O'Neill was in the Victoria Grande prison in Melilla, she learned that her young daughters were being taken to the peninsula. She shouted, "murderers, scoundrels; you have killed my husband and now they take away my daughters." These exclamations caused a second tribunal to be convened for the offense of insulting the Army, though she was eventually acquitted. Her father-in-law, Colonel Carlos Leret Úbeda, enrolled the girls in a school for military orphans.

On 12 July 1940, the Court of Political Responsibilities of Melilla opened a new case for Carlota O'Neill (file 4017, Act of 9 February 1939), where they note that her predominant influence on her husband, Captain Leret, and the writings which she authored, contributed to fomenting the anarchic and disastrous situation that necessitated the initiation of the national movement. On this basis, the court's decision disqualified her from holding public posts of the state, province, and municipality for five years, and imposed an economic penalty.

In the three years and nine months she was in prison, she worked as a correspondent for the Francoist weekly Redención. This job allowed the penalty reduction cooperating with the Francoist regime. This newspaper was promoted by the Catholic Propagandists Association and the collaborators were qualified as traitors by defenders of the Spanish Republic

=== Freedom and migration ===
After her release from prison, she moved to her sister's home in Barcelona, Enriqueta, mother of Lidia Falcón, who worked in the Francoist censorship. Carlota O'Neill, thanks to the help of José Bernabé Oliva (Provincial Press Secretary of Barcelona and therefore responsible for censorship there), transferred her daughters to a school in Barcelona, Christ the King. Years later, O'Neill's daughter would remember this aid as qualifying him as a "good person" despite having fought on the side that had assassinated her father, Virgilio Leret. (In fact, Bernabé, a former Republican, chose not to go into exile and had been subjected to a purge process and even a court martial. He overcame the latter and was incorporated by Diego Ramírez Pastor, into the editorial staff of El Correo Catalán as a literary critic and editorial writer.)

During this period, she as Laura de Noves, her mother as Nora Avante, and her sister as Regina Flavio, started to write, mainly romance novels, to begin to write to contribute to the family economy. Her writings were promoted by the Francoist regime, thanks to the relationship of her sister with José Bernabé Oliva

When her daughters grew up, she decided to go to Venezuela with knowledge of francoist regime and later moved to Mexico, her father's country. In Mexico she wrote, years after the events, a book in which she recounts her experience in the Spanish Civil War, her term in the Victoria Grande prison, where she remained until 1940, the military trials she was subjected to, her struggle to regain custody of her daughters once she got out of prison, and her travel to Venezuela.

Originally published in Mexico in 1964 under the title Una mexicana en la guerra de España (A Mexican Woman in the Spanish War), it was not published in Spain until 1979, under the title Una mujer en la guerra de España (A Woman in the Spanish War). Seven editions of the book have been published, the last of which by Oberon, Grupo ANAYA S.A., Madrid in 2006. It has been translated into English, with the title Trapped in Spain (Dumont Press, Toronto, 1978), and Polish, as Spojrzenie zza kr (S. W. Czytelnik, Warsaw, 1968).

=== Reclaiming the work of her husband ===
Virgilio Leret had designed a continuous-reaction turbocharger engine. This invention was patented in the Industrial Property Register of Madrid on 28 March 1935, with the number 137,729. The president of the republic, Manuel Azaña, named Leret a professor at the Four Winds School of Mechanics and commissioned Hispano-Suiza Aviation to construct a prototype in September 1936. Leret did not become a teacher and the prototype was not built. Leret's design was at the forefront of aeronautical advances that were registered in Europe.

Carlota kept alive the memory of her husband and spread his story, collected in her book Una mujer en la guerra de España. A point made in the book is that, after the execution of Virgilio Leret, his belongings were sent to her in prison. According to the author, these included three copies of the engine plans, which she sent away by clandestine means to be kept in the house of the father of another inmate. Meanwhile the Leret family in Spain, documents show, has copy number 3.

In 1940, she handed over the plans and the memoir of the invention to Commander James Dickson, United Kingdom air attache in Madrid, in the hope that Leret's work would be of help to the Allies in the Second World War. In 1971, she asked the British government what happened to the engine drawings delivered 30 years earlier at their embassy in Madrid, but received no response.

=== Legacy and controversy with her political family ===
O'Neill died, aged 95, on 20 June 2000 in Caracas. In 2007, a street in Madrid was renamed in her honor. During her life, Carlota was critical of her father-in-law, Colonel Carlos Leret Úbeda, and did not have good relations with her political family. In 2017, Virgilio Leret's family in Spain, descendants of his brothers, started a campaign to eliminate the Francoists' names of the streets. They claimed, bizarrely, that Carlota O'Neill had been a supporter of Francoist Spain.

== Works ==
=== As Carlota O'Neill ===
==== Romance novels ====
- ¡No tenéis corazón! (1924)
- Eva Glaydthon (1924)
- Historia de un beso (1925)
- Pigmalión (1925)

=== Other works ===
- ¿Qué sabe usted de Safo?: amó a las mujeres y a los hombres (1960)
- "Amor": diario de una desintoxicación (1963)
- La verdad de Venezuela (1968)
- Los muertos también hablan (1973)
- Teatro (1974)
- Romanza de las rejas: prosa poética (1977)
- Cinco maneras de morir: diálogos (1982)
- Circe y los cerdos; Cómo fue España encadenada; Los que no pudieron huir (1997)

==== Autobiography ====
- Una mujer en la guerra de España/Una mexicana en la guerra de España (1964)

=== As Carlota Lionell ===
==== Biographical novella ====
- La triste romanza de amor de Franz Schubert (1942)

=== As Laura de Noves ===
==== Biographical novellas ====
- E. D'araquy (1942)
- El amor imposible de Gustavo Adolfo Bécquer (1942)
- Elisabeth Vigée-Lebrun: pintora de reinas (1944)

==== Romance novels ====
- Rascacielos (1942)
- Beso a usted la mano señora (1943)
- Esposa fugitiva (1943)
- Al servicio del corazón (1945)
- En mitad del corazón (1949)
- …y la luz se hizo
- ¿Quiere usted ser mi marido?
- La señorita del antifaz
- Las amó a todas
- No fue vencida
- Patricia Packerson pierde el tren
- Vidas divergentes

==== Chiquita series ====
- Chiquita modista: manual de modistería práctico (together with Elena Ramos) (1955)
- Chiquita en sociedad: guía y orientación para comportarse en el trato social (1955)
- Chiquita se casa (1955)
