= Vindicación Feminista =

Monthly feminist magazine in Spain (1976–1979)

- Editor-in-chief: Lidia Falcón; Carmen Alcalde
- Categories: Feminist magazine
- Frequency: Monthly
- Founder: Lidia Falcón; Carmen Alcalde
- Founded: 1976
- First issue: July 1976
- Final issue: December 1979
- Country: Spain
- Based in: Barcelona
- Language: Spanish

Vindicación Feminista (Spanish: Feminist Vindication) was a monthly feminist magazine which was published in Barcelona, Spain, in the period 1976–1979. It is the first feminist magazine established in Spain during the transition from dictatorship to democracy. The magazine was part of the second wave feminism.

== History and profile ==
Vindicación Feminista was founded by Lidia Falcón and Carmen Alcalde in 1976. The first issue of the monthly magazine appeared in July that year. Both founders also served as the editor-in-chief of the magazine of which the contributors were all women journalists. They were the advocates of the radical and gendered activism and adopted the view of Kate Millett: the personal is political. The magazine was a supporter of abortion and harshly criticised and ridiculed Telva, a women's magazine which opposed the legalization of abortion.

Although the magazine was the illustrative feminist publication for the transition period, it ceased publication in December 1979 after producing a total of thirty issues due to financial constraints and lower levels of readership.
