= Telva =

Spanish monthly women's magazine

- Categories: Women's magazine Lifestyle magazines
- Frequency: Monthly
- Circulation: 113,745 (2019)
- Publisher: Unidad Editorial Socieda de Revistas SL
- Founded: 1963; 63 years ago
- Company: RCS Media Group
- Country: Spain
- Based in: Madrid
- Language: Spanish
- Website: Telva

Telva is a Spanish language monthly women's magazine published in Madrid, Spain. It is one of the largest and earliest women's magazines in the country.

== History and profile ==
Telva was started in October 1963. During its initial phase, the magazine was controlled by Opus Dei. More specifically, the publisher of the magazine was owned by Opus Dei and had a conservative political stance.

Pilar Salcedo held the position of director of Telva from its founding in October 1963 to 1970. Covadonga O'Shea became the editor in 1970 who had worked as deputy director after leaving education with a degree. Following the death of Franco in 1975 the Spanish institutions began to take part in democratic transition, but Telva did not change its ultra conservative stance. For instance, it continued to oppose the legalization of abortion which was criticised by a feminist magazine, Vindicación Feminista.

The magazine was part of Recoletos group until February 2007 when the company was acquired by RCS Media Group. It is published by Unidad Editorial Socieda de Revistas SL on a monthly basis and features articles on fashion, beauty, and lifestyle. Its headquarters is in Madrid. The monthly has several annual supplements.

The price of the magazine was 35 Pesetas in the mid-1970s. In 2006 Telva sold 174,436 copies. The circulation of the magazine was 174,750 copies in 2009, making it the second best-selling women's monthly magazine in Spain. It was 181,434 copies in 2010, and it grew to 188,524 copies in 2011. The magazine sold 183,336 copies in 2012. Between July 2012 and June 2013, its circulation was 162,101 copies. In 2019 Telva sold 113,745 copies.

== See also ==
- List of magazines in Spain
