= July 1936 military uprising in Melilla =

Armed Uprising against the II Spanish Republic

- Part of the Spanish Civil War
Date	17–18 July 1936
Location	Melilla and Ceuta in Spain; Tetuán and Larache in Spanish protectorate in Morocco
Result	Nationalist victory
Territorial changes	Rebels seized Melilla, Ceuta and the Spanish protectorate in Morocco

Belligerents
Spanish Republic	Nationalist rebels

Commanders and leaders
Maj. Gen. Agustín Gomez Morato (POW); Gen. Manuel Romerales (executed); Cpt. Virgilio Leret Ruiz (executed); Plácido Álvarez	Col. E. Sáenz de Buruaga; Lt. Col. Darío Gazapo Valdés; Lt. Col. Juan Seguí Almuzara; Lt. Col. Luis Solans; Lt. Col. Juan Yagüe Blanco

Casualties and losses
189 executed	Unknown

The July 1936 military uprising in Melilla occurred at the start of the Spanish Civil War. The rebels seized the main garrisons of the Spanish Army in Africa, and by 18 July, had crushed the resistance of the army officers loyal to the Republican government. Supporters of the Second Spanish Republic were detained or shot.

== Background ==
One of the main goals of the Spanish coup of July 1936 was to secure Spanish Morocco, as the Spanish Army of Africa was the primary shock force of the Spanish Republican Army. This force comprised were Spanish regular soldiers, the Spanish Legion, and Moroccan mercenaries known as Regulares. Most of their officers supported the plot and rejected the liberal democracy. Only a handful of officers, such as General Manuel Romerales (commander-in-chief of the Spanish Army in Morocco), General Gomez Morato, and the high commissioner, Placido Alvarez Buylla, were loyal to the Republic, The Spanish workers in Morocco were unarmed and isolated from the Moroccan population.

== Coup ==
=== 17 July: Melilla ===
The leader of the plot, Emilio Mola, had ordered the Army of Africa to revolt at 5 a.m. on 18 July. However the plan was discovered by Republican officers of Melilla on 17 July, prompting the leader of the plot in the city, Colonel Segui, to initiate the uprising. Segui arrested General Romerales and seized the radio station proclaiming the estado de guerra. The Legionnaries, the Regulares, and the Assault Guards in Melilla joined to the rising. Seizing key buildings, they crushed the resistance in the working class quarters. General Romerales, the major of Melilla, the government delegate, the aerodrome commander, Virgilio Leret Ruiz, and all those who resisted the rebellion were shot. When General Morato discovered the uprising, he took an airplane to Melilla, but was arrested by the rebels upon landing.

=== 17 July: Ceuta and Tetuán ===
Seguí then telephoned Ceuta and Tetuán and sent a telegraph to Franco at Las Palmas. Colonel Juan Yagüe Blanco, with the II Battalion of the Spanish Legion, seized Ceuta while Colonel Saenz de Buruaga, with the V Bandera of the Spanish Legion, took Tetuán.

The rebel troops in Ceuta occupied the working class districts and killed prominent unionists and the major of the city, and in Tetuán, the Foreign Legion seized the Casa del pueblo and executed the union officers and all persons found with arms. Furthermore, Colonel Jan Luis Beigbeder gained the support of the Grand Vizier of Tetuán, Mulay Hassan, and Moroccan volunteers started to join the rebellion.

=== 18 July ===
In Larache the coup started at two o'clock in the morning of 18 July. Several engagements followed in which five assault guards and two rebel officers were killed, but by dawn the town was in the hands of the rebels. By mid-morning the only remaining centres of resistance were the High Commissioner's residence and the air force base at Tetuán.

The rebels threatened to bomb both and after a few hours the defenders surrendered to the Nationalists; all of them were executed, among them the high commissioner and the Major de la Puente Bahamonde – Francisco Franco's cousin. The same day, the workers of Tetúan and Melilla attempted a general strike, but were crushed by the insurgent troops.

=== Nationalist repression ===
On his secret instructions of 30 June for the coup in Morocco, Mola ordered: "to eliminate left-wing elements, communists, anarchists, union members, etc". The same day as the rising all the members of trade unions, left-wing parties, Masonic lodges and anyone known to have voted for the Popular Front were arrested. On the first night, the Nationalists executed 189 civilians and soldiers. On 20 July, the Nationalists opened their first Francoist concentration camp in Melilla.. There were reports that the entire Jewish population of Melilla was imprisoned in a concentration camp.

== Aftermath ==
By 18 July, the Spanish Army of Africa had seized all of Spanish Morocco and crushed the resistance. The same day, Francisco Franco started the rising in the Canary Islands. Then he took a De Havilland Dragon Rapide aircraft, paid for by Luis Bolín, and flew to Casablanca in French Morocco. On 19 July, Franco continued on to Tetuan and appointed himself chief of the Spanish Army in Morocco.

Most of the Republican Navy remained loyal to the government. The loyal ships patrolled the Strait of Gibraltar and Spanish Morocco was isolated from the rebel-held cities in Andalusia; Seville, Cadiz, Cordoba and Granada). Nevertheless, with the aid of Nazi Germany and Fascist Italy, the Nationalists managed to transport the Army of Africa's troops to the mainland and start their advance towards Madrid.

== See also ==
- List of Spanish Nationalist military equipment of the Spanish Civil War
- List of Spanish Republican military equipment of the Spanish Civil War

== Bibliography ==
- Beevor, A. (2006). The Battle for Spain. London: Penguin. ISBN 9780143037651.
- Jackson, G. (1967). The Spanish Republic and the Civil War. Princeton University Press. ISBN 9780691007571.
- Thomas, H. (2001). The Spanish Civil War. New York: Modern Library. ISBN 9780375755156.
