= Irene Falcón =

Spanish journalist, feminist, pacifist and Communist activist

- Irene Falcón flanked by Vicente Uribe and Planelles at a PCE meeting in Moscow, 1940
- Born: Irene Carlota Berta Lewy y Rodríguez; 27 November 1907; Madrid, Spain
- Died: 19 August 1999 (aged 91); El Espinar, Segovia, Spain
- Occupation: Journalist

Irene Rodríguez, née Irene Carlota Berta Lewy y Rodríguez (27 November 1907 – 19 August 1999) was a Spanish journalist, feminist, pacifist and Communist activist. For many years she was the assistant of Dolores Ibárruri, leader of the Spanish Communist Party, and she is best known for this role. After the Spanish Civil War she was forced into exile in Moscow and Beijing. She returned to Spain after the return to democracy in 1977.

== Early years ==
Irene Lewy Rodríguez was born in Madrid on 27 November 1907, the second of three sisters. Her father was Siegried Levy Herzberg, a middle-class Polish Jew.

Her father died when she was five. To survive, her mother, María del Carmen Rodríguez Núñez, rented rooms in their house in the Calle de Trafalgar.

Irene was educated at the German College and learned four languages. She obtained a position as a librarian for Santiago Ramón y Cajal (1852–1934). He was a biologist who won the Nobel Prize.

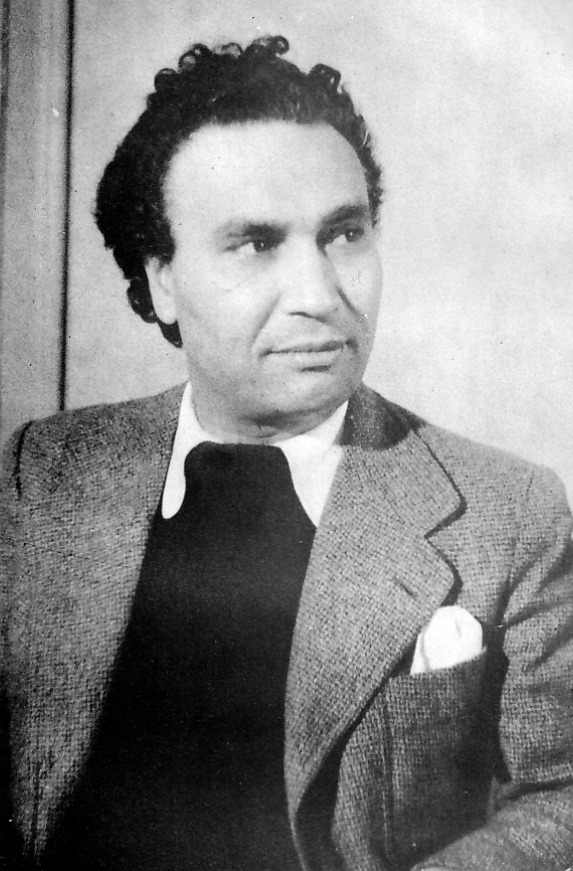
César Falcón (1892–1970), Irene Falcón's husband

In 1922 Irene Lewy met Peruvian journalist César Falcón (1892–1970), and fell in love. Two years later the newspaper El Sol asked Falcón to move to London as a correspondent.

They married, and Irene accompanied him. She was contracted as correspondent by the daily La Voz (The Voice), a Spanish newspaper. Their son Mayo was born in London in May 1926 but was not registered at the Spanish consulate due to their concerns with the dictatorship of Miguel Primo de Rivera.

Irene and César returned to Spain after Primo de Rivera fell in 1930. The Falcóns published Historia Nueva (New History) and launched the party Izquierda Revolucionaria y Antiimperialista (IRYA: Anti-Imperialist Revolutionary Left).

Irene founded the feminist organization Mujeres Antifascistas (Anti-Fascist Women).{{sfn|Ireneÿÿÿgs Langley Moore]], Vera Inber and Dora Russell, wife of Bertrand Russell, whom Irene had met in London. Irene wrote in the preface to Dora Russell's Hypatia,

Female emancipation must bring peace to the people, must avoid by all means a repetition of the horrors of war, where their children, subjects of civilized nations, kill and are killed for no reason, bound by a false patriotism because true patriotism is the love of humanity. If mothers, wives know how to explain this to their men with intelligence, they will manage to overcome the pull of the trumpets and drums and all the decorative deception of militarism.

== Communist activist ==
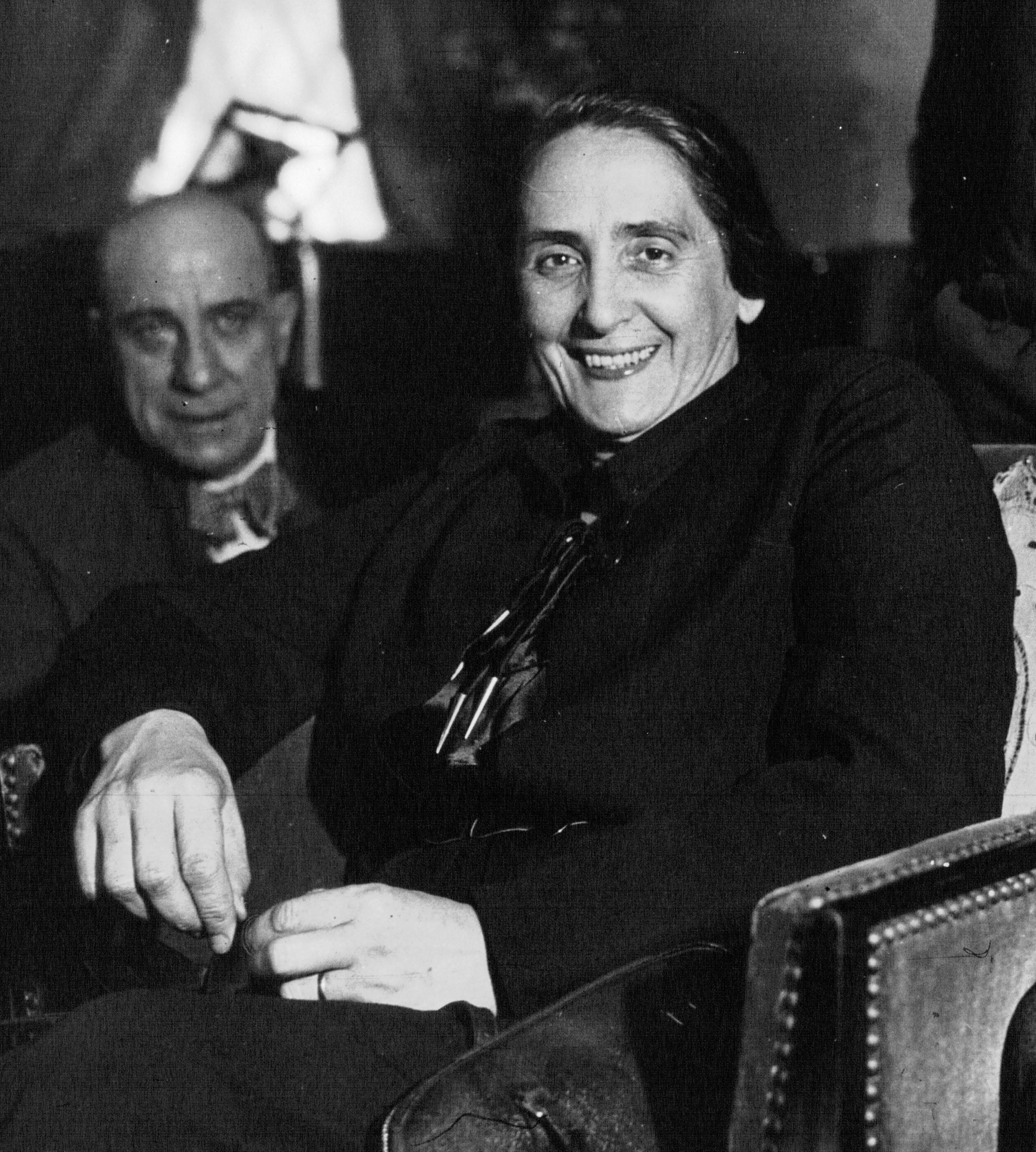
Dolores Ibárruri in 1936

The Falcóns joined the Spanish Communist Party in 1932, when IRYA merged into that party. There Irene met Dolores Ibárruri, known as Pasionaria. They lost their jobs with the newspapers, and lived in poverty in a slum in Madrid. They formed the Teatro Proletario, a theater group. This group, also called Nosotros ("Us"), was formed in 1933 and performed work by Maxim Gorky and the classic anti-war drama Hinkemann by Ernst Toller. In the summer of 1933 they visited Moscow with the Teatro Proletario group. The Soviet press reported in depth on their performances.

The Spanish Committee of Women against War and Fascism, affiliated with the World Committee Against War and Fascism, was created with a committee controlled by the PCE. In August 1934 the Spanish committee sent a delegation to the World Congress of Women against War and Fascism in Paris. Ibárruri led the group, which included two Republicans and two Communists, Encarnación Fuyola and Irene Falcón. The Spanish committee was dissolved in October 1934 during the repression that followed the Asturian miners' strike.

In 1934 Irene went to Moscow as correspondent of Mundo Obrero (Worker's World), the PCE newspaper. She returned to Spain in 1937 during the Spanish Civil War (1936–39) to help Dolores Ibárruri, and became her close colleague and friend until Ibárruri's death in November 1989. She used the pseudonym "Toboso". Early in March 1939 she helped arrange the evacuation of senior party members from Spain. Ibárruri left for Oran on 6 March 1939.

== Exile ==
Irene Falcón went into exile with Ibárruri in Paris and then the USSR. There she worked for the underground Radio Pirenaica. The Falcóns' marriage broke down because César Falcón could not remain faithful. During World War II (1939–45) Irene and César Falcón were separated, and after the war César returned to Peru.

Irene Falcón remained a feminist within the Communist mold. Writing in the Communist magazine Nuestra Bandera in August 1946 Falcon called for women to continue to play their traditional nurturing role, but to also participate in the struggle against Fascism. She wrote, "Precisely in the clandestine resistance, women can play and are playing an extremely important role. On the one hand, women who have already played an active part in workers or mass organizations are an important support to their partners and children who choose the heroic path of resistance, the one that helps the guerrilla movements." In August 1946 Falcon became national secretary of the Union of Spanish Women.

After the Prague show trial of 1952, eleven Czechoslovak Communists were executed, including Falcón's former lover Bedřich Geminder, head of the Czech Communist Party's central committee's Department of International Relations. Although her relationship with Geminder had ended in 1945 Falcón was thrown out of the party. She became a persona non grata and lost her job at Radio Pirenaica. She and her sister Kety were banned from working, and her son Mayo was banned from the Soviet Communist Party. Ibárruri managed to get her another job, working discreetly to avoid herself getting into trouble. In 1954 Irene Falcón went to Beijing to launch a radio station in Castilian. After a year and a half she returned to the USSR.

Irene Falcón returned to Spain from exile in 1977 after the return of democracy. She became director of the Dolores Ibárruri Foundation. In 1996 she published her memoirs entitled Asaltar los cielos. Mi vida junto a Pasionaria (Storm the Skies: My Life with Pasionaria). She died on 19 August 1999 in El Espinar, Segovia, from a respiratory condition.

== Works ==
- V. I. Lenin; J. Stalin; Trotski, Irène Falcon; Michel Koltsov (1937). Trotski et le trotskisme. Textes et documents. Paris: Bureau d'éditions, 31, boulevard Magenta. p. 96.
- Irene Falcón; Manuel Jiménez & Jesús Montero (1996). Asalto a los cielos : mi vida junto a Pasionaria. p. 455.

== Sources ==
- Alba, Víctor (1983-01-01). The Communist Party in Spain. Transaction Publishers. ISBN 978-1-4128-1999-2.
- Díaz Arenas, Angel (1997-01-01). Quién es quién en la obra narrativa de Manuel Vázquez Montalbán. Edition Reichenberger. ISBN 978-3-930700-53-0.
- Dimitrov, Georgi (2008-10-01). The Diary of Georgi Dimitrov, 1933-1949. Yale University Press. ISBN 978-0-300-13385-1.
- Domingo, Carmen (2004). Con voz y voto. Lumen. ISBN 978-84-264-1416-8.
- Finnerty, Deirdre (2013-10-04). "The Republican Mother". Memory and Cultural History of the Spanish Civil War: Realms of Oblivion. BRILL. ISBN 978-90-04-25996-6.
- Herrmann, Gina (2010). Written in Red: The Communist Memoir in Spain. University of Illinois Press. ISBN 978-0-252-03469-5.
- "Irene Falcón, secretaria personal de Pasionaria". El País. 1999-08-20.
- London, John (1997). Reception and Renewal in Modern Spanish Theatre, 1939-1963. MHRA. ISBN 978-0-901286-83-3.
- Preston, Paul (2011-04-08). Las tres Españas del 36 (in Spanish). Penguin Random House Grupo Editorial España. ISBN 978-84-9989-139-2.
- Salvadó, Francisco J. Romero (2013). Historical Dictionary of the Spanish Civil War. Rowman & Littlefield. ISBN 978-0-8108-5784-1.
- Zurbano Melero, José Gabriel (2010-11-22). "César e Irene Falcón: un matrimonio con compromiso". Ciudad futura.
