= Feria, Badajoz =

Feria
- Coat of arms

- Location of Feria within Extremadura Feria (Spain)
- Coordinates: 38°30′46″N 6°33′50″W
- Country: Spain
- Autonomous community: Extremadura
- Province: Badajoz
- Comarca: Zafra - Río Bodión

Government
  - Alcaldesa: Isabel Carvajal Ramírez

Area
  - Total: 73.7 km^{2} (28.5 sq mi)

Population (2025-01-01)
  - Total: 1,054
- Time zone: UTC+1 (CET)
  - Summer (DST): UTC+2 (CEST)
- Website: Ayuntamiento de Feria

Feria (pronounced [ˈfeɾja]) is a Spanish municipality in the province of Badajoz, Extremadura. It has a population of 1,369 (2007) and an area of 73.7 km^{2} (28 sq mi).

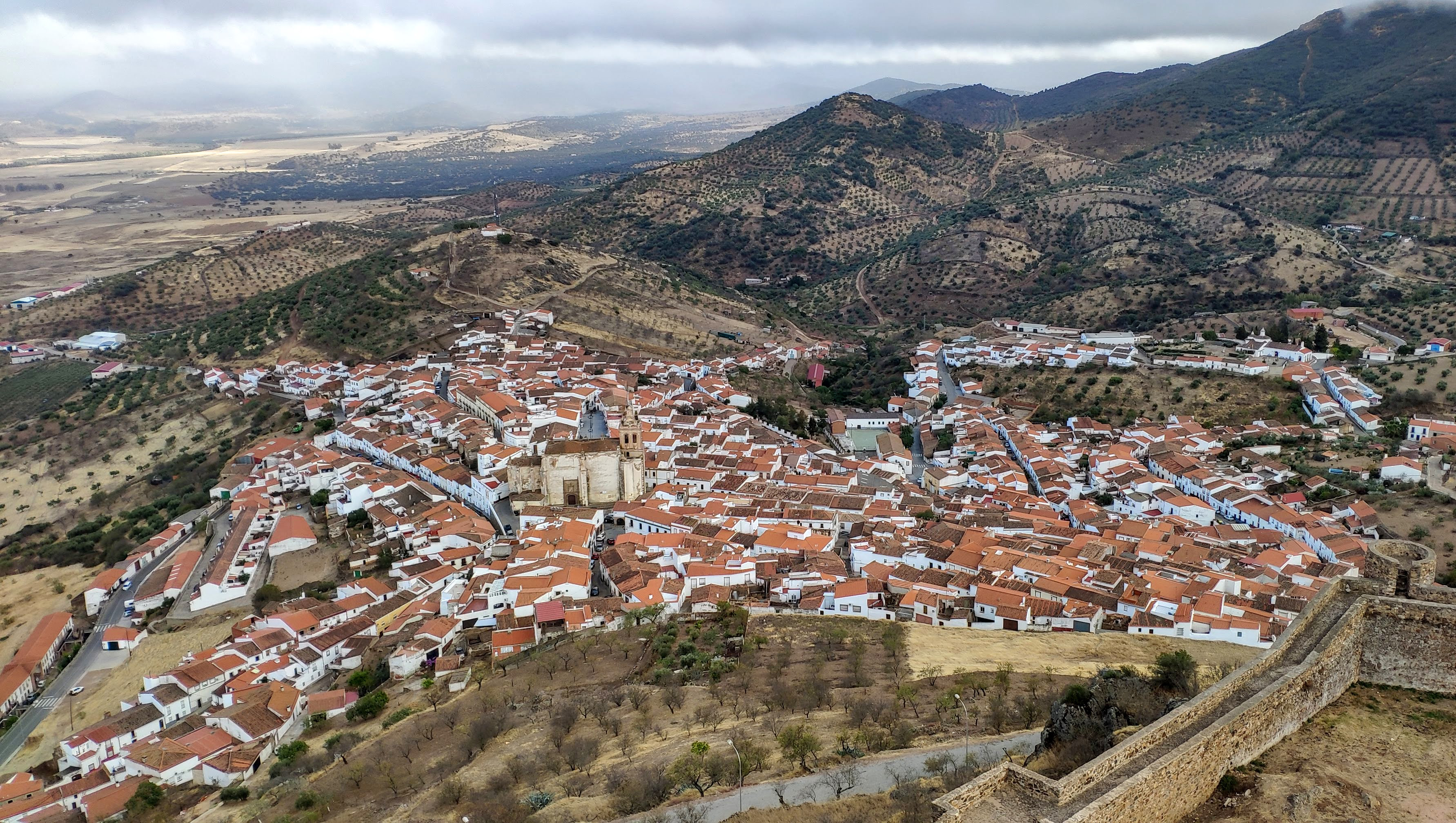
Southern side of the Sierra Vieja, a subrange of the Sierra Morena, in Feria.

== See also ==
- List of municipalities in Badajoz
