= Virgilio Leret =

Spanish air force officer (1902–1936)

Virgilio Leret Ruiz (23 August 1902 – 18 July 1936) was a Spanish air force commander, writer and pioneer of aeronautical engineering with a patented jet-engine design. He is believed to be the first officer executed in the Spanish Civil War after a Nationalist-rebel takeover of the presidio of Melilla in the Spanish protectorate of Morocco.

== Biography ==
He was born in Pamplona, the third child of seven children born to María Luisa Ruíz y Ramírez and Lieutenant-Colonel Carlos Manuel Leret y Úbeda. His family, originally from Havana, Cuba, moved there because of the independence of Cuba and the loss of Spain's colonies in South America. Aged four, he entered a Marist Brothers school. Like his father, he followed a career in the military, joining the Academia de Infantería de Toledo on 3 August 1917.

On 8 July 1920 he graduated – first in his class – as second lieutenant and was assigned to Ceuta in the Regimiento de Infantería Serrallo nº 69 under his father's command and the overall direction of General Felipe Navarro in Western Spanish Morocco. He joined his unit on 20 August and was involved in occupying villages of the cabila of Beni Ider, south-west of Tetuán, Souk El Arbaa, Tazarut and Dar Acoba, both in Ajmás, the region around the city of Chefchaouen, and Chefchaouen itself.

On 28 May 1921 he was posted for three months to the new Campamento de Aviación de Sania Ramel, the first airport in Spanish Morocco. He continued in the Moroccan campaign until 1922 where he was also posted to protect a new military airstrip in Asilah. On 8 July he was promoted to infantry lieutenant and in January 1923 transferred to Larache in the Batallón de Cazadores de Montaña Barcelona No.3 (mountain hunters battalion) and then the No.1 batallón in 1925 at the Castillo de Montjuic, then the No.2 batallón of the Regimiento de Infantería de Sevilla No.33 in Cartagena although still based south of Larache in the cabila of Jolot and Tilig at El Aouamara airfield until September when he entered the army's Central Gymnastics School in Toledo.

He was released and took the military pilot course at the Albacete School, but didn't complete it as he was ordered to return to Larache to aid his colleagues in their withdrawal from Chefchaouen and other areas. In Barcelona, he met his future partner, Carlota O'Neill y de Lamo, a left-wing feminist writer.

He went to Los Alcázares in March 1926 for the observer course, and within days was hospitalised for a month in the navy's military hospital in Cartagena after an aircraft accident. He returned, gaining reconnaissance-flight experience in Larache and qualifying in June 1926; he was assigned to the 2nd Western-Zone Squadron Group. He survived a forced landing due to engine failure in November. In 1927, he moved to the 5th Expeditionary Group but was hospitalised again due to malaria and spent a few months recuperating until July, when he was promoted to infantry captain and received training in the pilots' school of Alcalá de Henares in Madrid and advanced training in the Escuela de Instrucción o Transformación de Guadalajara. He qualified as a civilian pilot in October 1927 and in January the following year completed military pilot training. In November 1928, he wrote to Carlota O'Neill asking if she would marry "as a social defence for the future" for their daughters, Maria Gabriela and Carlota, adding that his father also wanted it. He was granted a licence to marry that month. He was assigned to the Madrid squadron No.31 at the Getafe aerodrome in January 1929. On February 10, he married Carlota O'Neill in a Catholic ceremony. The children were ignored by their grandparents until after the Nationalist uprising because of the stigma of their being conceived out of wedlock, although Leret's father did provide some money to Carlota O'Neill. Later in 1929, he qualified as an electromechanical engineer as he had been studying through a correspondence course of the Internacional Institución Electrotécnica.

On 15 December 1930 Leret and eleven others refused to pursue general Queipo de Llano and air commander Ramón Franco who had escaped by aeroplane to Portugal after their failed Cuatro Vientos aerodrome uprising. This had occurred three days after the Jaca uprising. He was sentenced to military prison and discharged. He was amnestied after the proclamation of the Second Spanish Republic shortly afterwards, joining squad No. 3 in Barcelona and group 31 in Getafe. In May 1932 he went to El Atalayón hydroplane base in Melilla and a few months later took the seaplane course in Los Alcázares, completing it in February 1933. He was in the seaplane race back to Spain in 1934. He was arrested in 1935 for denouncing a political military broadcast and sentenced to two months' imprisonment in the fort of El Hacho, Ceuta.

== Jet engine design ==
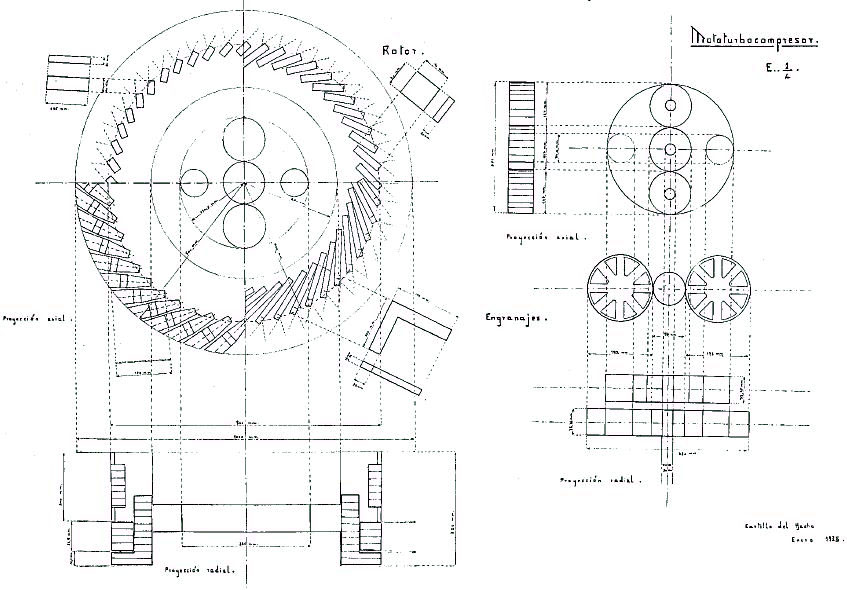
Leret Ruis's plan for a jet engine, dated January 1935, included as part of his patent application.

In prison, he worked on his project for a jet engine. When released, he was imprisoned again by the head of Moroccan military forces – for previously failing to support right-wing general José Sanjurjo's attempted coup in 1932 – but he continued with his project. On 28 March 1935 a patent was granted for a turbocompresor de reacción continua, como propulsor de aviones, y en general de toda clase de vehículos (continuous reaction turbocompressor, for propulsion of aircraft, and in general all types of vehicles) at the Propiedad Industrial de Madrid (British air-force pilot and aeronautical engineer Frank Whittle patented his jet-engine design in 1930 and German physicist and engineer Hans von Ohain patented his design in 1936). The President of Spain, Manuel Azaña, was informed of the project and on 28 April 1936 made him professor of the mechanics' school at Cuatro Vientos aerodrome to commence experiments. He'd already been given a posting to El Atalyón but stayed at Cuatro Vientos until May. In September 1936 – after Leret's death – Azaña authorised production of the jet engine to begin at Hispano Suiza de Aviación's manufacturing plant.

== Nationalist uprising and execution ==
On 17 July 1936 a Nationalist uprising began with an attack on the sea plane base. Leret was with his family, on a boat anchored by the base, and he rowed ashore. With second lieutenants Armando González Corral and Luis Calvo Calavia in his squadron, Leret defended the base, which was futile given that many soldiers were on leave. The advance of a column of Regulares led by the Francoist Moroccan officer Mohamed Meziane towards Melilla was halted so they could help in the attack on the base. Leret defended the base for several hours, causing two Moroccan casualties, before running out of ammunition. Further details are unclear but after capture he was beaten severely, given a brief trial and shot dead on 18 July with his colleagues. One report claims that his own colleagues were forced to shoot him. Carlota Leret O'Neill, unaware of Leret's execution, was imprisoned the same day and was given four suitcases, including one belonging to Leret which her captors did not know contained his jet-engine designs. With the help of two other prisoners, the plans were secretly smuggled out to their relatives. The whereabouts of the bodies of Leret and his colleagues remain unknown.

== Awards and legacy ==
- 1921 – Moroccan Military Medal with the Tetuán pin.
- 1922 – First Class Cross of Military Merit with red badge.
- 1925 – Tribute Medal.
- 1927 – First Class Cross of Military Merit with red badge
- 1929 – First Class Cross of Military Merit with red badge.
- 1933 – Campaign commemorative medal with the Moroccan pin.

For his loyalty to the Republic, he was posthumously promoted to the rank of commander. Leret was multilingual and published under the pseudonym El caballero del azul the novel Ismael el Cóndor about Spanish Morocco, and the surrealist social-commentary Historia biográfica de Nova-Aquilae. Carlota Leret O'Neill was sentenced to six years' imprisonment and released on probation after five. She regained custody of her children, who had been taken in by relatives of her husband. She recovered Leret's jet-engine designs from a prisoner's family, hidden under a floor-tile, and went with her mother to hand one copy secretly to aviation attaché James Dickson at British embassy in Madrid (Dickson was killed in an accident shortly afterwards). Leret's daughter Carlota continued to promote his memory, resulting in a documentary was about Leret's engine in 2011 funded by Spain's national airport authority Aena. In 2014, a model of the engine was completed and displayed at the Museo de Aeronáutica y Astronáutica in Madrid.
