= Mundo Obrero =

Periodical of the Communist Party of Spain (PCE)

Mundo Obrero (Spanish: Workers World) is the periodical of the Communist Party of Spain (PCE). The paper is based in Madrid, Spain.

== History and profile ==
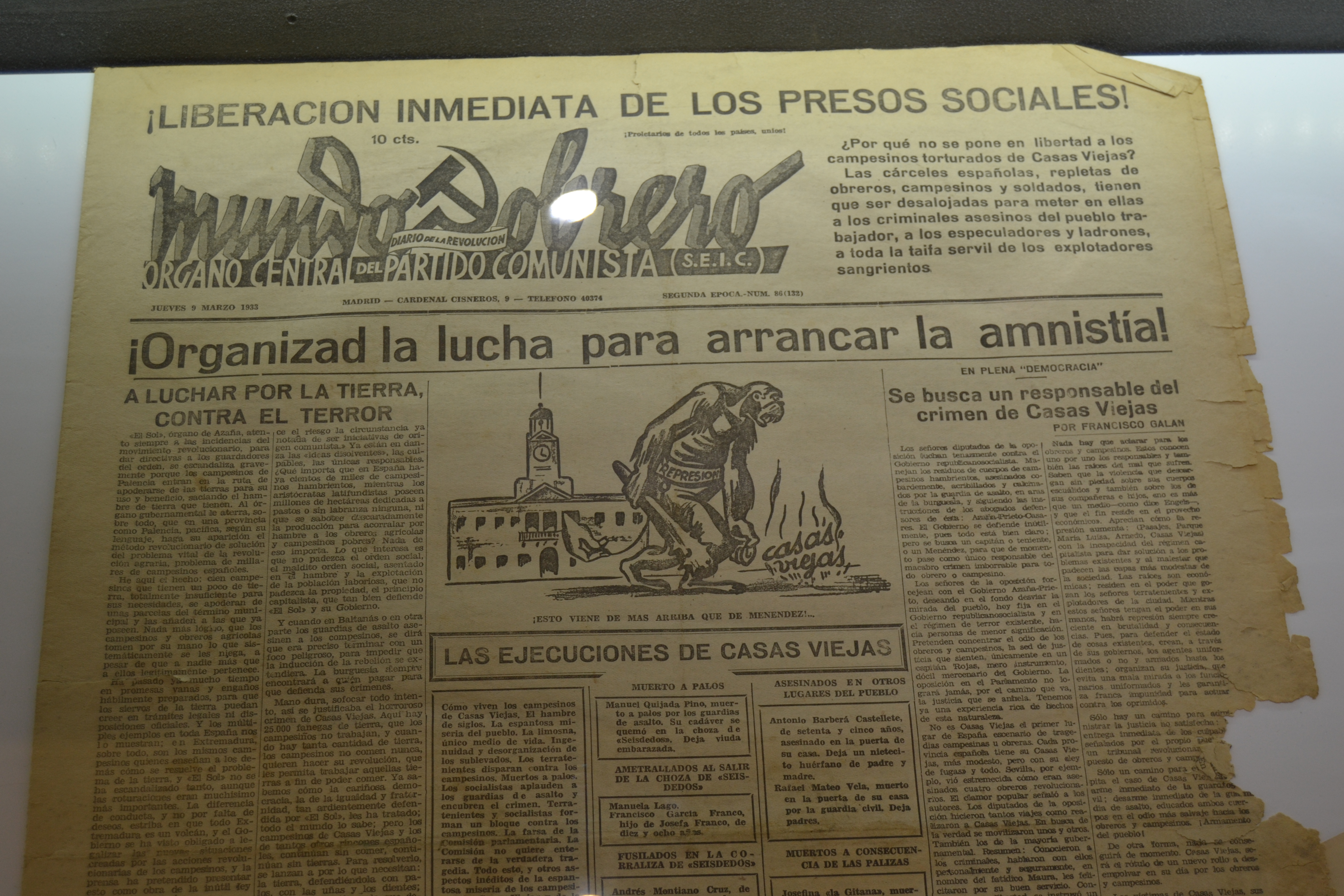
40 años de Comisiones Obreras. Exposición conmemorativa.

Mundo Obrero was first published on 14 November 1931. During its initial phase the paper was edited by the Peruvian journalist César Falcón and was financed by the Soviet Union. Its headquarters is in Madrid. Two of its notable contributors was Dolores Ibárruri and Lina Ódena. Its editor-in-chief was Jesús Hernández at the outbreak of the Spanish Civil War. The paper was illegally published during the rule of Franco and adopted a strict Bolshevist stance arguing that capitalism, social democracy and Trotskyism were all threatening views.

The paper is published fortnightly and contains articles related to the Spanish and international political situations, the opinions of the different bodies of the party as well as relevant party members, and on the activities of the Party and the Communist Youth Union of Spain (UJCE).
