= César Falcón =

Peruvian writer, journalist and politician

César Falcón Gárfias
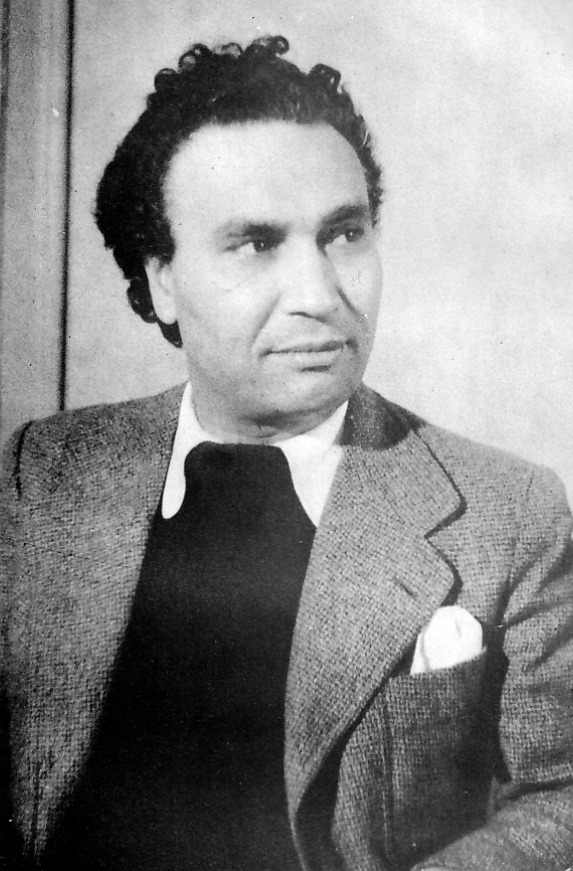
- Falcón c. 1939
- Born: 19 April 1892; Lima, Peru
- Died: 11 October 1970 (aged 78); Lima, Peru
- Occupations: Writer, journalist and politician

César Falcón Gárfias (19 April 1892 – 11 October 1970) was a Peruvian writer, journalist and politician. He lived most of his adult years outside the country, going to Spain in 1919, where he continued writing and left-wing activism.

He left after the Fascists won the Civil War. After a brief time in Peru, he finally settled in Mexico, living there from 1947 to his death in 1970.

== Life ==
=== Early years ===
César Falcón Gárfias was born in Lima, Peru in 1892. From an early age, he was enthusiastic about revolutionary politics. He and María Weisse founded a group called Amauta, a forum for reporting the abuses of imperialism and working towards improved conditions for the Peruvian working class. Through this group and other political activities, he became known to other left-leaning intellectuals and artists in Peru. Falcón and the essayist Moquegua José Carlos Mariátegui co-founded the newspaper La Razón (Reason). The paper stood out for its strident defense of university reform and strong support for the labor movement.

=== Spain ===
A few months after La Razón was launched, on 4 July 1919 Augusto Bernardino Leguía staged a successful coup.

Falcón and Mariátegui were radically opposed to the dictatorship that began to emerge. Their printers withdrew support. To quietly get his opponents out of the way, Leguía invited a number of them to accept scholarships to travel to Europe. With little choice, Falcón moved to Spain.

Mariátegui went to Italy and then travelled through Europe, with lengthy stays in France, Germany, Austria, Hungary and Czechoslovakia, where he became imbued with Communist ideology.

Mariátegui joined Falcón, Carlos Roe and Palmiro Machiavelo to found the first Peruvian Communist cell.Their goal was to promote (from Europe) the political organization of Peruvian workers.

Falcón soon became one of the leaders of left-wing activists in Spain. He worked for several newspapers and magazines. He met Irene Lewy Rodríguez (1908–99) in 1922.

Two years later the newspaper El Sol asked Falcón to move to London as a correspondent. Falcón married Irene Lewy, who accompanied him under contract as correspondent by the daily La Voz (The Voice), a Spanish newspaper. Their son Mayo was born in London in May 1926 but was not registered at the Spanish consulate due to concerns with the dictatorship of Miguel Primo de Rivera.

From 1927 to 1939 César Falcón edited various publications of the Spanish Communist Party. Irene and César returned to Spain after Primo de Rivera fell in 1930. They published Historia Nueva (New History) and launched the party Izquierda Revolucionaria y Antiimperialista (IRYA: Anti-Imperialist Revolutionary Left).

They were active during the Spanish Civil War (1936–39). The Falcóns' marriage broke down because César Falcón could not remain faithful. He had a daughter Lidia Falcon with Enriqueta O'Neill, a Spanish writer who raised the girl with some family support.

=== Later years ===
When the fascist forces won the war, Falcón was forced to leave Spain. During World War II (1939–45) Irene and César Falcón were separated, and César returned to Peru. There he wrote for journals such as Garcilaso and Nuestra Voz.

He was forced to leave Peru due to his political views, and finally settled in Mexico. He lived there from 1947 to 1970. He launched Historia Nueva, which became a prestigious publication. César Falcón Gárfias died in Lima in 1970.

== Works ==
=== Theater ===
- Por culpa ajena (estrenada en el Teatro Lima, Lima, 10 de febrero de 1914)
- La gran noche (Lima, septiembre de 1915)
- La casa de Agreda (estrenada en el Teatro Colón, 27 de noviembre de 1914).
- Los mozos cundas (Lima, julio de 1918)
- Asturias (Madrid, 1935).

=== Fiction ===
- Plantel de inválidos (Madrid, 1921 y 1928), cuentos.
- El pueblo sin Dios (Madrid, 1928), novela indigenista, que fue fruto de su estancia en la ciudad de Huánuco.
- Los bajos fondos (Madrid, 1928), novela.
- Madrid (Madrid-Barcelona, 1938), crónica novelada de la resistencia republicana en Madrid, durante la guerra civil española.
- El buen vecino Sanabria U. (México, 1947), caricaturización violenta del presidente peruano Manuel Prado Ugarteche, que se caracterizó por su apoyo a la política de los Estados Unidos entre 1939 y 1945.
- Por la ruta sin horizonte (México, 1961), primer tomo de una serie de cinco, titulada globalmente En la perspectiva de España.

=== Essays ===
- Crítica de la revolución española (Desde la dictadura hasta las Constituyentes) (Madrid, 1931)
- Imperialismo y antiimperialismo (Comentarios a la acción contra los yanquis) (Madrid, 1931)
- España sostiene en Ginebra su línea de lucha por la democracia y la paz (Barcelona, 1938)
- El mundo que agoniza (México, 1945), examen de la situación mundial en el periodo entre las dos guerras mundiales.
- Algunas condiciones necesarias de la reconquista nacional (México, 1955), sobre las perspectivas de la recuperación democrática en España.

== Sources ==
- Fernández de Cano, J. R. (2015). "Falcón Garfias, César (1892-1970)". MCN Biografias.
- "Irene Falcón, secretaria personal de Pasionaria". El País. 20 August 1999.
- Salvadó, Francisco J. Romero (2013). Historical Dictionary of the Spanish Civil War. Rowman & Littlefield. ISBN 978-0-8108-5784-1.
- Zurbano Melero, José Gabriel (22 November 2010). "César e Irene Falcón: un matrimonio con compromiso". Ciudad futura.
