= La Voz de la Mujer (Spanish magazine) =

La Voz de la Mujer (1917-1931) was a Spanish magazine, first monthly and, from 1925, weekly, dedicated to the defense of women.

== History ==
It was founded by Consuelo González Ramos in 1917, and Celsia Regis directed it until 1931. Initially defined as a "monthly magazine dedicated to the defense of women," it was renamed a "feminist newspaper, dedicated to social progress, culture, and professional guidance for women."

La Voz de la Mujer was the spokesperson for the Madrid Institute of Culture, the Lyceum Club Femenino, and the Union of Spanish Feminism. Its director, Celsia Regis, sought to form a united, apolitical front dedicated to defending women's rights without distinction of class or ideology. This position was even criticized by one of the magazine's contributors, the socialist María Cambrils, but Celsia Regis countered her, stating that her political stance alienated many women.

In 1925, the statutes and program of the Union of Spanish Feminism, an organization founded by Celsia Regis, were published in its pages. Its objective was to overcome differences and join forces to demand legal equality between men and women, the reform of legal codes, access to the labor and professional markets, and to generate a female consciousness.

Promoted by this magazine, the first feminist rally in Spain was held in Madrid in 1926. Women workers also participated, along with many women who expressed their radical positions and who had chosen to collaborate with La Voz de Mujer rather than remain silent. Leonor Serrano Pablo and Clara Campoamor, among others, participated in this rally. This magazine also published an interview with Miguel Primo de Rivera, in which he declared himself a feminist, having championed the presence of women in political office.

In 1928, to report on all the activities promoted by Celsia Regis and the magazine, the magazine was expanded with a supplement, "Las subsistencias."

Throughout its issues, reviews of the lives and work of many contemporary women appeared, such as the writer and feminist Dolores Monserdá (no. 2), Concha Espina (no. 82), Pilar Millán Astray (no. 83); women of the past, such as María Josefa Massanés (no. 1); it promoted new authors, such as writers Sofía Blasco (no. 82) and Josefina Bolinaga, and painters such as Maroussia Valero (no. 83); and educational institutions geared towards women, such as the Ibero-American Center for Popular Female Culture, No. 1; the Association for the Education of Women, No. 2, among others.
