= Monument to Concepción Arenal (Madrid) =

Monument in Madrid

Concepción Arenal
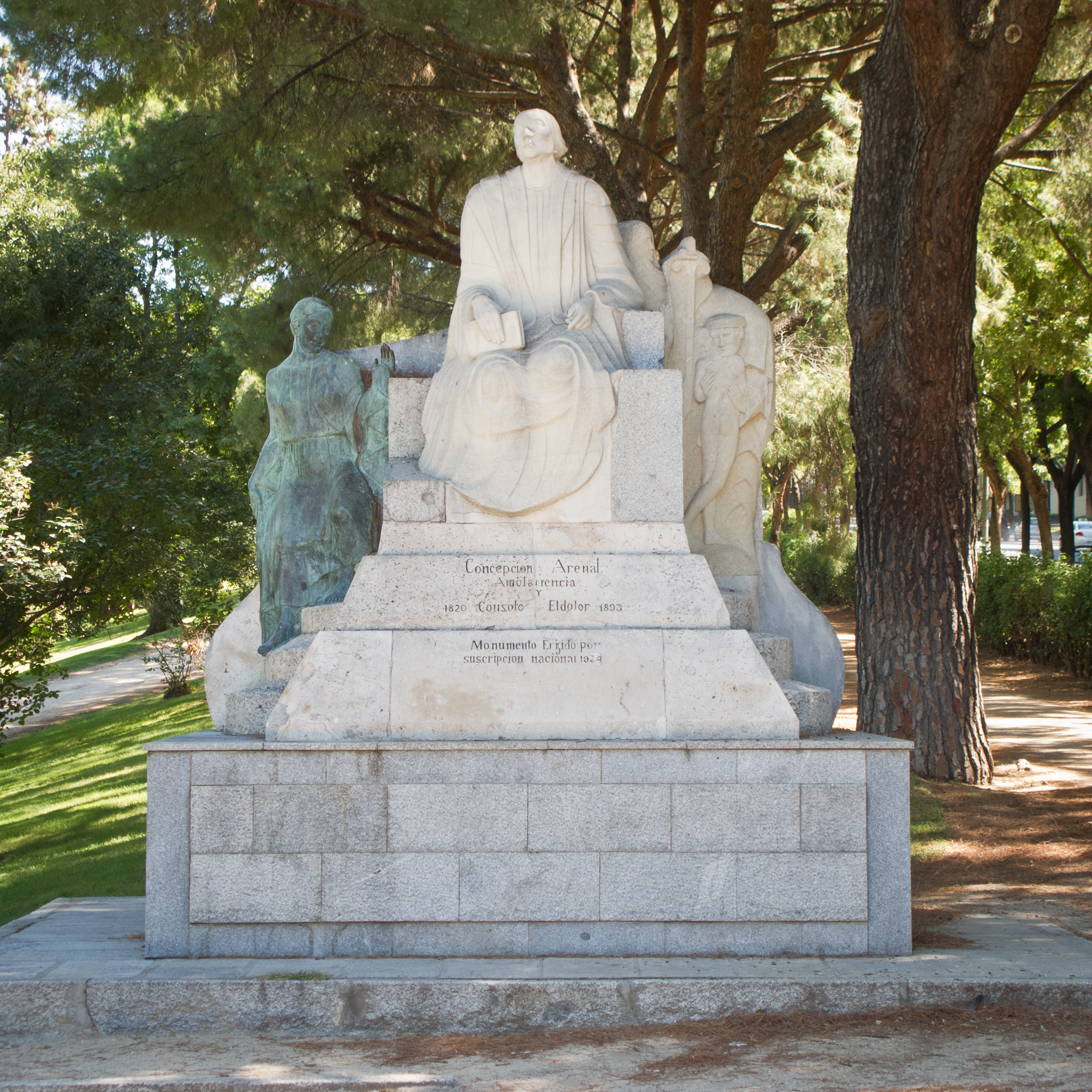
- 40.432862°N 3.72515°W
- Location: Parque del Oeste, Madrid, Spain
- Designer: José María Palma
- Material: Limestone, granite, bronze
- Opening date: 29 May 1934
- Dedicated to: Concepción Arenal

The Monument to Concepción Arenal is an instance of public art in Madrid, Spain. Located at the Parque del Oeste, it is dedicated to Concepción Arenal, 19th-century standout jurist and precursor of feminism.

== History and description ==
The monument was a work by José María Palma Burgos, a sculptor from Granada. It was funded via popular subscription.

The sculptural group consisted of a granite basement displaying the seated statue of Concepción Arenal, made of limestone and dressed with a judicial robe, sided to her right flank by an allegory of Peace cast in bronze, and a symbolization of the ideas of Liberty, Justice and Forgiveness, sculpted in stone, to her left flank.

An inscription at its base reads "concepción arenal. amó la ciencia. consoló el dolor" ("Concepción Arenal. She loved science. She comforted pain").

It was unveiled on 29 May 1934 at the plaza de Ruperto Chapí, located at the Parque del Oeste. Some of the institutional representatives attending the event were Niceto Alcalá Zamora (President of the Republic), Pedro Rico (Mayor of Madrid), Rafael Sánchez Guerra (Secretary of the Presidency), Victoria Kent (Director–General of Prisons), Álvaro de Albornoz (President of the Court of Constitutional Guarantees), Gerardo Abad Conde (President of the Council of State), Diego Medina y García (President of the Supreme Court), Vicente Cantos (Minister of Justice), Filiberto Villalobos (Minister of Public Instruction). The ceremony was also attended by a number of prominent women in the public sphere such as Concha Espina, Magda Donato, Matilde Muñoz, Pilar Millán Astray or Regina García among others. José María Poyán (President of the Lar Gallego), Clara Campoamor (on behalf of the organizing committee for the erection of the monument) and Vicente Cantos (as representative of the Government) intervened as speakers.

The monument endured damage during the 1936–1939 Civil War. Following the end of the war, the monument underwent a restoration, directed by José María Palma himself with help from architect Pedro Muguruza.

The monument was moved to its current location within the park, near the Paseo Moret, in 1995.
