= Convention City =

Lost 1933 pre-code film

- Directed by: Archie Mayo
- Screenplay by: Robert Lord
- Story by: Peter Milne
- Produced by: Henry Blanke
- Starring: Joan Blondell; Guy Kibbee; Dick Powell; Mary Astor; Adolphe Menjou
- Cinematography: William Rees
- Edited by: Owen Marks
- Production company: First National Pictures
- Distributed by: Warner Bros. Pictures, Inc.
- Release date: December 14, 1933
- Running time: 69 minutes
- Country: United States
- Language: English
- Budget: $239,000

Convention City is a 1933 American pre-Code sex comedy film directed by Archie Mayo, and starring Joan Blondell, Guy Kibbee, Dick Powell, Mary Astor and Adolphe Menjou. The film was produced by Henry Blanke and First National Pictures and distributed by Warner Bros. Pictures.

Due to its racy content, Convention City was held from circulation after the Motion Picture Production Code was enacted in 1934. Prints were subsequently ordered to be destroyed by studio head Jack L. Warner. The film is considered lost and has become one of the more coveted lost films because of its reported racy content.

== Plot ==
The plot revolves around the convention of the Honeywell Rubber Company in Atlantic City. Throughout the film, the employees of Honeywell Rubber are mainly concerned with drinking and sex. President J.B. Honeywell is to choose a new company salesmanager. T.R. Kent and George Ellerbe are two salesmen who both want the job. However, they both get into trouble: T.R. is discredited when jealous saleswoman Arlene Dale interferes with his attempted seduction of Honeywell's daughter Claire and George attempts to seduce Nancy Lorraine. The position of sales manager is bestowed upon a drunken employee as a bribe after he catches J.B. about to visit "Daisy La Rue, Exterminator".

== Cast ==
- Joan Blondell as Nancy Lorraine
- Adolphe Menjou as T.R. "Ted" Kent
- Dick Powell as Jerry Ford
- Mary Astor as Arlene Dale
- Guy Kibbee as George Ellerbe
- Frank McHugh as Will Goodwin
- Patricia Ellis as Claire Honeywell
- Ruth Donnelly as Mrs. Ellerbe
- Hugh Herbert as Hotstetter
- Grant Mitchell as J.B. Honeywell
- Egon Brecher as Zorb
- Hobart Cavanaugh as Wendell Orchard
- Sheila Terry as Mrs. Kent
- Gordon Westcott as Phil Lorraine / Frank Wilson
- Harry C. Bradley as Graham
- Samuel S. Hinds as McAllister

== Production ==
During production, the film faced censorship problems from Motion Picture Association of America (MPPDA) due to its risque content and dialogue. Joan Blondell later said, "We were forever doing things among ourselves with double meanings. Finally, they would have people in the front office just watch for what we'd say off-color." Several lines were ordered to be removed by the MPPDA censors including:

No, but it won't be marriage. I'll guarantee you that. A traveling salesman needs a wife like a baby needs a box of matches.

Now you take off that dress and I'll take off my toupee, huh!

Girl's voice: 'Listen, sister, if they tire you, you better leave town before the Hercules Tool Company gets here.

In a studio memo, Jack L. Warner warned producer Hal Wallis that he may be going too far in the costuming:

We must put brassieres on Joan Blondell and make her cover up her breasts because, otherwise, we are going to have these pictures stopped in a lot of places. I believe in showing their forms but, for Lord's sake, don't let those bulbs stick out.

Script changes, suggested by the chair of the Motion Picture Division of the State of New York Department of Education Dr. James Wingate and Jason S. Joy, director of the Studio Relations Committee, and production head Hal Wallis were nominally incorporated into the script.

== Reception ==
=== Critical reviews ===
Dr. James Wingate, chair of the Motion Picture Division of the State of New York Department of Education — which oversaw the state's censorship board — described it as "a pretty rowdy picture, dealing largely with drunkenness, blackmail, and lechery, and without any particularly sympathetic characters or elements."

Time magazine said that, "Convention City is a glib, disorganized batch of footnotes on a familiar aspect of U.S. business." and that "Convention City is adumbrated with many a drinking scene, a company song ("Oh, Honeywell" to the tune of "My Maryland"), and some quips which may cause some cinemagoers to wonder what Will Hays is doing."

The New York Times said that, "Several of the jokes need a subterranean mind to be correctly understood. An accurate appraisal of Convention City should include the information that the Strand's audiences laughed long and loud." The Times also praised Adolphe Menjou's performance while finding Joan Blondell's performances to be getting tiresome as she was playing the same irreverent character in her films.

=== Box office ===
Convention City cost $239,000 to produce, and earned $384,000 in domestic revenue and $138,000 from foreign release, for an eventual profit of $53,000.

== Preservation status ==
Due to the lewdness of the film and lack of influence of the Studio Relations Committee, which was supposed to control objectionable content, Convention City and films like it led to the enforcement of the Production Code, overseen by Joseph Breen. The film's producer, Henry Blanke, later said, "...Single-handedly I brought on the whole Code. Yeah. Ask Joe Breen. He'll tell you. Ask him about Convention City." The Code had been created in 1930 at the beginning of the Depression, but was rarely enforced as financially strapped studios often overlooked its authority in the desire to make more risque pictures that were good box office.

As a result of the Code, the film was taken out of circulation when its theatre run ended. The controversy surrounding the film prompted exhibitors and theatre convention organizers to request the film.

In 1936, Warners attempted to re-release Convention City in a censored form, but Breen deemed it beyond redemption and would not grant it the seal of approval needed for it to be shown in theatres. Warners then reportedly ordered that the film be destroyed. However, Ron Hutchinson, the editor of the newsletter The Vitaphone Project, discovered that a print of the film was screened in 1937, nearly three years after the ban had been enacted, indicating that at least one print had not been taken out of circulation. Further evidence that not all prints had been seized and destroyed was found in the August 29, 1942, edition of the Spanish newspaper ABC. According to an advertisement, the film (known as ¡Que Semana! in Spanish) was being screened at the Muñoz Seca Theater in Madrid.

In the late 1940s and 1950s, Warner Bros. destroyed many of its negatives due to nitrate film decomposition. Studio records indicate that the negative of Convention City and filmography pre-1931 was marked "Junked 12/27/48" (December 27, 1948). No prints of the film are known to currently exist, though rumors that private collectors own foreign prints have continued to surface as late as 1999. However, it was also re-copyrighted by United Artists Associated in 1963.

The original screenplay still survives in the Warner Bros. script archives. In March 1994, a pre-Code film festival was held in South Village. Along with the films screened, there was a dramatic reading of the screenplay for Convention City.

== See also ==
- List of lost films
