= ANME =

ANME may refer to:

- Anaerobic methanotroph, a type of microorganism associated with the anaerobic oxidation of methane
- Asociación Nacional de Mujeres Españolas, a Spanish feminist organization
