= Censorship in Francoist Spain =

Policy of Francoist Spain

Censorship in Francoist Spain was mandated by Francisco Franco in Francoist Spain, between 1936–1975. In Francoist Spain, primary subjects of censorship included public display of liberal political ideology, art forms such as literature and film, as well as symbols of foreign, non-conservative ideologies. This censorship was primarily driven by Franco's vision for ideological unity in Spain. As a result, Franco called for the censorship of materials that promoted liberal ideas from abroad, particular those of European origin. Aside from censorship of foreign ideology, symbols of Spanish identity, such as Catalonia, also became primary targets of censorship. Under his authoritarian reign, censorship was imposed primarily through systemic political repression. The Francoist State repressed expression of liberal social and political ideology among the Spanish public.

Aside from strong government censorship, Franco also gained the support of the Catholic Church in perpetuating censorship. Beyond censorship motivated by the Francoist State, individual critics had other, non-political interests that led them to becoming censors as well. For example, individual censors would alter a text for clarity and coherence, or rewrite reviews on grounds of propriety as they deemed fit according to their individual standards. Political censors, on the other hand, would repress visible signs of liberal behavior and seek to paint a positive image of Franco. Given the prevalence of censorship, Francoist Spain was also marked by a robust culture of resistance of censorship. In response to government suppression, Spain saw an era that subsequently fostered a culture of resistance, expressed in various art forms.

== Subject matter and agenda ==
=== Literature ===
In Francoist Spain, repression of political and cultural liberalism was a primary motivator for censors editing various literary works. Some censors had alternative reasons for censoring literary works of foreign authors which was not motivated by Franco's ideology. This was done on grounds that pluralism and cultural diversity would present threats to Spanish unity. Some writers also participated in self-censorship, aware that they were writing for censors that would review their work.

Translation of literary works from foreign countries underwent comprehensive censorship. In this way, translation served as a means to restructure and alter original versions of various works, rather than a bridge for intercultural exchange. In the case of Francoist Spain, materials would be edited to remove content that was deemed morally objectionable. In conformity to religious influences from the Catholic church, publishers would rephrase and edit these foreign works as necessary. More specifically, censors sought to minimize the potential of influence by European liberalism on Spanish culture. Some censorship of literature continues to the present day as previously censored texts have not been updated. Spanish culture itself had also undergone state censorship. Symbols of Spanish culture, such as Flamenco, were prohibited from public display by Franco's administration.

Critics and reviewers of literature tended to be independent. They wrote reviews and often framed their criticism as a suggestion for greater coherence or clarity of writers' ideas. Novelists during the Franco era often presented strained or troubled relationships between fictional characters as a means to convey their ideas about violence by the state, which would not have been acceptable by state censors. Writers likened violence in the private lives of fictional characters, such as sexual predation or physical violence, to the political sphere of conquest in Francoist Spain.

=== Film ===
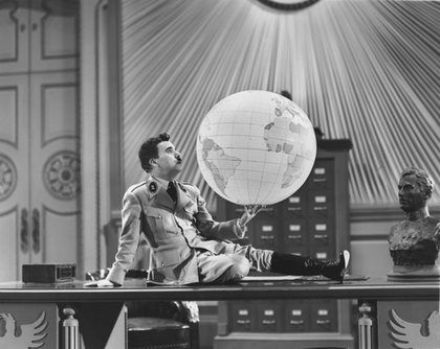
One of the most famous scenes from Charles Chaplin’s film The Great Dictator (1940), in which Hinkel dreams of dominating the world. This parody of Hitler and fascism was banned by Francoist censorship. It could not be shown in Spain until after Franco’s death

In Francoist Spain, film served both as an art form as well as a means of discourse in an era of repression. This repression worked beyond just critics' review of local films. Language politics of Francoist Spain required for dubbing of foreign films in Spain to be adapted to satisfy specific requirements and norms set by Franco's administration. Producers of film, actors and distributors of film were generally aware of these requirements, resulting in wide use of film as a means to engage in major social and political issues.

Among contemporary scholars, Spanish national film during the Francoist State is often interpreted as a signal of political, social, economic and cultural transition, specifically as the nation's transition from traditional values to modern ones. Film producers and performers are often perceived as resisting the repression imposed by the Francoist State through script writing and performance in film. In 1937, a set of guidelines was issued to emphasize that cultural morality must be preserved through centralized control of the cinema. Censorship boards were founded in order to properly revise and censor foreign works entering Spain. In 1938, state institutions such as the National Commission of Film Censorship were established. These state institutions were tasked with ensuring the moral integrity of the content in films. Examples of content that were unacceptable included content that depicted divorce, theft, sensuality and revealing clothing. They screened films for content that had potential to cause disorder, panic or violence.

Women's rights, particularly women's working rights, were formally recognized by the state in the 1963 Development Plan. However, conservative Catholicism remained the primary source of guidance in personal and public conduct. This perceived ideological tension led to an era in which Spanish national film became interested in depictions of gender roles, with many films addressing the tension between tradition and modernity. In displaying traditional gender roles of women in film, state institutions tended to approve these films, perceived as depictions of peaceful, everyday life.

=== Peripheral nationalisms ===
Catalonia under the rule of Franco underwent extensive censorship and repression following Franco's victory over nationalists. After the end of the Spanish civil war, intellectuals with visible Catalan ideologies were punished in various ways, including execution, subjugation and forced labor. Along with the imprisonment, execution and exile of these individuals, traces of Catalan identity were removed from formal use, such as newspapers, state education and magazines. This was done on grounds of linguistic cohesiveness, which made publishing difficult in Catalan.

In the mid-1950s, when Francoist Spain reoriented its policies and introduced a stabilization plan to include Spain in the European market, a small network of student opposition movements began to emerge. Their goal was to preserve Catalan identity under the Francoist State. As a result of increased foreign investment by the Spanish government, there was an increase in the publication of books in Catalan. By 1962, there were as many as 270 books published in Catalan. From there, increases in publication was minor, as there was not enough interest nor state support to continue producing these books.

== Catholic Church and censorship ==
In 1937, it was created the Junta Superior de Censura Cinematográfica, with headquarters in Salamanca. Its mission was to ban, totally or partially, films that may be considered contrary to morals or to the principles of the dictatorship. Its regulation gave a prominent place to the Catholic Church: according to article 4, the vote of the ecclesiastical representative at the Junta "will be especially worthy of respect in religious matters, and will be decisive in serious moral cases in which he expressly states his veto".

The Spanish Catholic ministers controlled state censorship from 1945, though "at the same time they judged it insufficient". Acción Católica Española (ACE, the Spanish branch of Catholic Action) exercised the majority power of censorship related to creative projects being published in Francoist Spain, so "ACE's cultural repression intended to reproduce and indoctrinate society in certain models of behavior, which responded to the ideology approved by the Church". ACE considered modernist works (published after the French Revolution) not suitable for circulation, what was the cause of discrepancy with the State since Francoist authorities understood them to be patriotic, while ACE's ideological framework judged them deeply anti-Catholic. Another clergyman, Father Peiró, headed a censor team that led moral and religious censorship of movies. In 1950, the Catholic Church created the Oficina Nacional Clasificadora de Espectáculos ("National Entertainment Classification Office"), which rated each film —according to moral and religious criteria that remained in place for many years— and issued an eventual ecclesiastical recommendation.

From 1951, with the appointment of integralist Gabriel Arias Salgado as Minister of Information and Tourism, it starts a highly repressive era for Spanish cinema. When asked by a foreign journalist about the increase of censorship during his mandate, he stated:

Say what you want, but I'll reveal something to you: before implementing the new orientation rules, ninety percent of Spanish people went to Hell; now, thanks to us, only twenty-five percent are condemned.

Since the signing of the Concordat of 1953 between the Holy See and Spanish State, the Spanish Catholic Church reinforced its hegemony over the censor system, so Catholic commandment and morals became fully integrated into censoring decisions.

The position of the Spanish Catholic Church regarding cinema was especially negative and condemnatory. Bishop Marcelino Olaechea considered the burning of movie theaters as "a great good for humanity". Father Ayala, an influential Catholic propagandist, stated: "Cinema is the greatest calamity that has befallen the world from Adam to this time. More calamitous than the universal flood, than the european war, than the atomic bomb. Cinema will wipe out humanity!"

After a censorious relaxation period with Manuel Fraga Iribarne as a Minister, strong censorship returned in 1969 with new ultraconservative Minister Alfredo Sánchez Bella, a member of Opus Dei. Moral or sexual issues became relevant again to the censors: one of them justified censoring Separación matrimonial, directed by Angelino Fons in 1973, because "a Spanish woman, if separates from her husband, has to embrace religion or accept to live perpetually in solitude", according to this censor.
