= Consuelo González Ramos =

Consuelo González Ramos was a Spanish journalist, nurse, and feminist born in 1877. She worked as a nurse during the Rif War and founded La Voz de la Mujer, a publication that she directed until 1931. She also founded several feminist organizations, including the Asociación Nacional de Mujeres Españolas, the International Federation Feminist, and the Union of Spanish Feminism. González supported women's voting rights and favored a conservative and Catholic feminism. She wrote for the newspaper El Telegrama del Rif and supported the dictatorship of Primo de Rivera. She supported women's voting rights. She founded the publication La Voz de la Mujer in 1917, which she directed until 1931. She also founded the Asociación Nacional de Mujeres Españolas (1918), the International Federation Feminist (1919), and the Union of Spanish Feminism (1924). González favored a conservative and Catholic feminism, and supported the dictatorship of Primo de Rivera. González wrote for the newspaper, El Telegrama del Rif.

== Bibliography ==
- Blanco y Sánchez, Rufino (1925). Elementos de literatura española e hispanoamericana (in Spanish). Tip. de la "Revista de archivos, bibliotecas y museos".
- Fagoaga de Bartolomé, Concha (1985). La Voz y el Voto de Las Mujeres, 1877-1931. Icaria. ISBN 978-84-7426-107-3.
