= María Espinosa de los Monteros =

Spanish women's rights activist

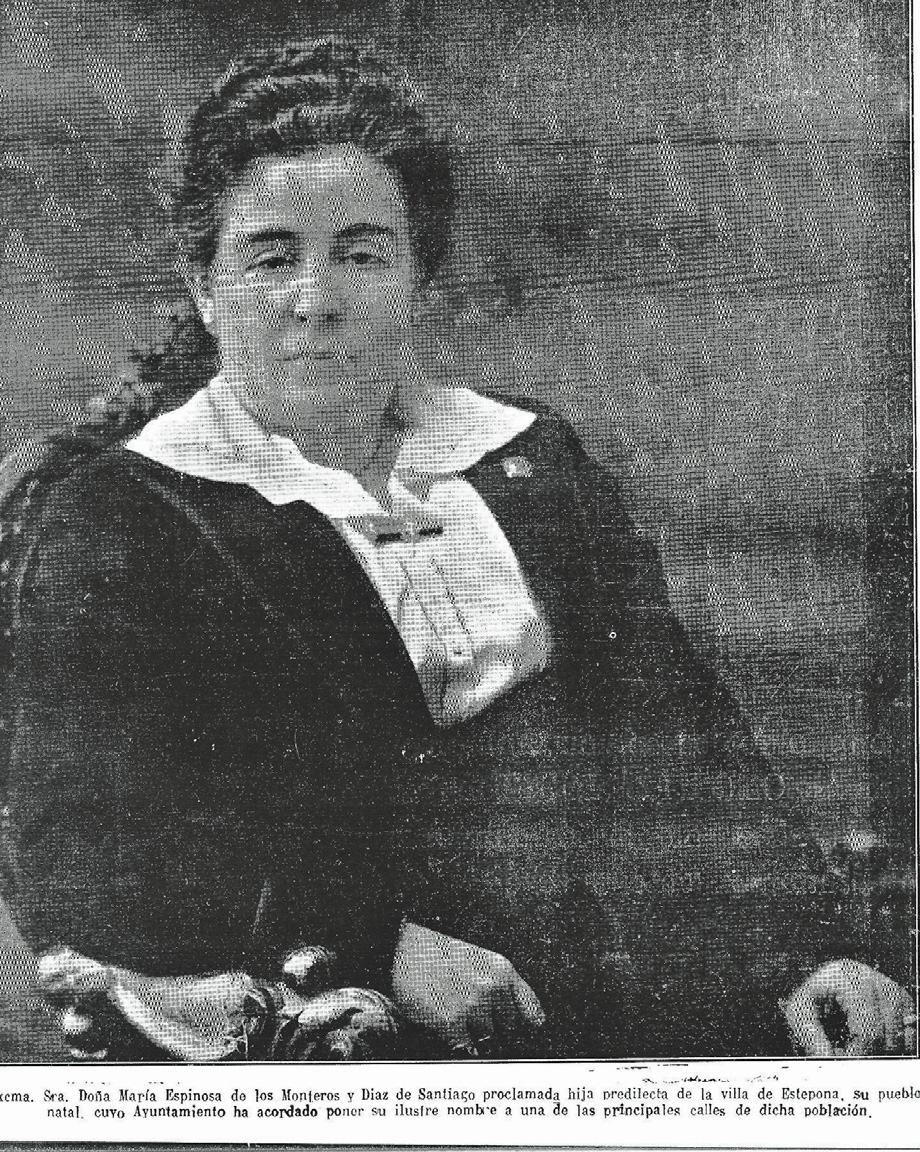
María Espinosa de los Monteros

María Espinosa de los Monteros y Díaz de Santiago, also María Espinosa Diaz, (1875–1946) was a Spanish women's rights activist and business executive. She is remembered in particular for founding in 1918 the Asociación Nacional de Mujeres Españolas (National Association of Spanish Women) which she headed until 1924. In 1898, she established the Spanish branch of the American Yost Typewriter Company, Casa Yost, which she headed until 1921. In 1926, she was appointed to serve as a councillor for the Municipality of Segovia.

== Early life ==
Born on 13 May 1875 in Estepona in the south of Spain, María Espinosa y Díaz was the daughter of Antonio Espinosa Aguilar, a merchant, and Juana Díaz Martín. In 1905, she married the lawyer Antonio Torres Chacón (1873–1940), with whom she had two children, Antonio and Álvaro, but the couple separated in 1911. She spent her early years in Estepona until her mother remarried and the family moved to Madrid. She appears to have received a good education including trips to France and England to learn languages.

== Career ==
Based on the experience of her trips abroad and recognizing the opportunities for women able to work as typists, in 1898 she founded and headed Casa Yost, the Spanish subsidiary of the Yost Typewriter Machine Company, of Bridgeport, Connecticut. She successfully ran the Madrid-based branch for over 20 years, receiving acclaim from Milton Bartholomew who headed the American company.

Espinosa's active contributions to feminism began in October 1918 when she founded ANME or the Asociación Nacional de Mujeres Españolas. In 1920, she delivered two significant lectures in Madrid and Barcelona establishing her basic goals. On 22 January 1920 in Madrid's Royal Academy of Jurisprudence and Legislation she spoke on the Influencia del feminismo en la legislación contemporánea (Influence of Feminism in Contemporary Legislation), expressing the need for women to obtain political and labour rights, better living and health conditions and the right to vote. She emphasized that thanks to their intelligence, women would be able to improve policy in the general interest while supporting equality between the sexes. She also called for better pay for workers and even for the establishment of a feminist party.

Espinosa also headed the Consejo Supremo Feminista de España (Supreme Feminist Council of Spain), founded in 1919, bringing together five important feminist associations: La Mujer del Porvenir, la Progresiva Femenina de Barcelona, La Liga para el Progreso de la Mujer, la Liga Concepción Arenal de Valencia and ANME.

She continued to head ANME until around 1924 when she moved to Segovia, probably because her two sons began to study at the newly established Academia de Artillería. She bought a house there where she lived with her sons and her intimate friend Ana Picar. She continued her business activities, mainly in real estate, making quite a fortune.

On 11 January 1926, Espinosa was appointed to serve on the council of the Municipality of Segovia. Her main task was to set up a tourist office covering the surrounding communities. She also published lists of hotels throughout Spain and created publicity posters and brochures for other areas such as Madrid and Barcelona. She resigned as a councillor on 13 March 1928.

== Later life ==
Little is known of her activities during the Spanish Civil War but she discontinued her feminist activities in 1931. As a result of a pulmonary disorder, she moved to Alicante together with her friend Ana Picar with whom she remained for the rest of her life. She died in Alicante on 13 December 1946 and was buried in the municipal cemetery.
