= Concepción Arenal =

Spanish writer (1820–1893)

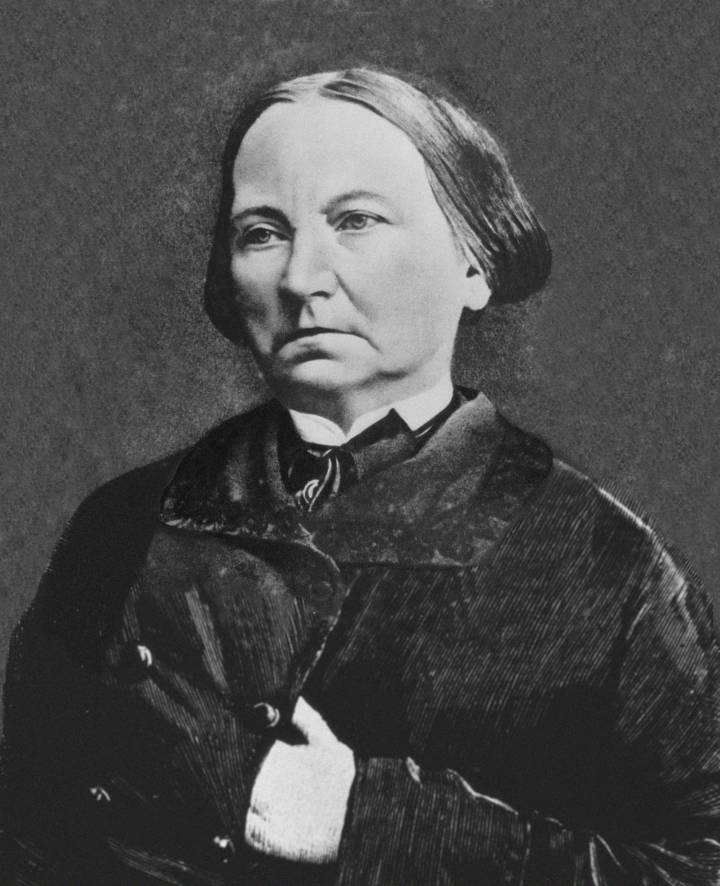
- Born: María de la Concepción Jesusa Luisa Petra Vicenta del Arenal y Ponte; 31 January 1820; Ferrol, Spain
- Died: 4 February 1893 (aged 73); Vigo (Pontevedra), Spain
- Spouse: Fernando García Carrasco (m. 1848)
- Children: 3

Concepción Arenal Ponte (Ferrol, 31 January 1820 – Vigo, 4 February 1893) was a graduate in law, thinker, journalist, poet and Galician dramatic author within the literary Realism and pioneer in Spanish feminism. Born in Ferrol, Galicia, she excelled in literature and was the first woman to attend university in Spain. She was also a pioneer and founder of the feminist movement in Spain.

== Life ==
Her father, Ángel del Arenal y de la Cuesta, was a liberal military officer who was often imprisoned for his ideology and opposition to the regime of Ferdinand VII. He fell ill in prison and died in 1829, when Concepción was aged 9. She moved to Armaño (Cantabria) with her mother, María Concepción Ponte Mandiá Tenreiro, and then to Madrid in 1834, to attend the school of the Count of Tepa. Against her mother's wishes in 1841 she went to law school at the Central University (now the Complutense University of Madrid), becoming the first woman in Spain to attend university. She secretly disguised herself in masculine attire as all Spanish universities forbade women to attend studies at that time. She also attended political and literary debates, unheard of at the time for a woman.

She graduated and in 1848 she married lawyer and writer Fernando García Carrasco. They had three children: a daughter that died shortly after birth, and two sons, Fernando (b. 1850) and Ramón (b. 1852). In her later years, her health being a permanent cause of concern, Concepción Arenal lived with her son Fernando and Fernando's second wife, Ernestina Winter.

Concepción Arenal and her husband collaborated closely on the liberal newspaper Iberia until Fernando's death in 1859. Penniless she was forced to sell all her possessions in Armaño and moved into the house of violinist and composer Jesús de Monasterio in Potes, Cantabria, where in 1859 she founded the feminist group Conference of Saint Vincent de Paul in order to help the poor. Two years later the Academy of Moral Sciences and Politics awarded her a prize for her work La beneficencia, la filantropía y la caridad [Beneficence, philanthropy and charity]. It was the first time the Academy gave the prize to a woman.

In later years she published poetry books and essays such as Cartas á los Delincuentes [Letters to delinquents] (1865), “Ode against slavery” (1866), El reo, el pueblo y el verdugo, o, La ejecución pública de la pena de muerte [Convicts, the people and the executioner, or, The execution of the death sentence] (1867). In 1868 she was named Inspector of Women's Correctional Houses and in 1871 began fourteen years of collaboration with the Madrid-based magazine The Voice of Charity.

In 1872 she founded the Construction Beneficiary, a society dedicated to building cheap houses for workers. She also worked with the Red Cross helping the injured of the Carlist War, working in a hospital in Miranda de Ebro, later being named Secretary General of the Red Cross between 1871 and 1872. In 1877 she published Penitentiary Studies.

Concepción Arenal died the morning of 4 February 1893 of chronic bronchitis in Vigo, where she was buried a day later. Her epitaph is her personal motto: "To virtue, to life, to science."

== Contributions to feminism ==
Concepción Arenal is one of the pioneers of feminism in Spain. Her first work about women's rights was La Mujer del Porvenir [The woman of the future] (1869) where she critiques the theories defending the inferiority of women based on biological reasons. She defended women's access to any level of education, although not to any job because she considered that women were not skilled to be an authority figure. She did not support women's political involvement because they were at risk of suffering retaliation and neglecting their family. However, later she also wrote:

“a serious mistake, and one of the most harmful, to impress upon women that her sole mission is to be wife and mother; it amounts to tell her that she can be nothing by herself and to annihilate her moral and intellectual self”

She had a close relationship with krausism intellectuals. She was admirer of Fernando de Castro's work about women's education and also she was a member of Ateneo Artístico y Literairo de Señoras directors’ board keeping up to date with the progress made by Asociación para la Enseñanza de la Mujer (Association for Teaching Women). Years later, she collaborated regularly with Boletín de la Institución Libre de Enseñanza [Journal of the Institution of Free Teaching] submitting articles about criminal and feminist topics.

In 1882 Arenal participated-although she was not present- in the Congreso Pedagógico Hispano-Portugués-Americano [Congress of Hispanic-Portugues-American Pedagogy] hold in Madrid and led by Rafael Mª de Labra. She presented a paper about “La educación de la mujer” [Women's education] in the fifth section of the congress dedicated to Concepto y límites de la educación de la mujer, y de la aptitud professional de ésta [The concept and limits of women's education and her professional aptitude]. The section dealt with the debate of the similarities and difference between women and men's education, what tools were necessary to organize a good education system for women, what aptitudes women had for teaching and other jobs and women's physical education. The vice-president of this round table was Emilia Pardo Bazán. Arenal's position was supporting women's education without limitation.

== Legacy ==
Arenal's achievements were extraordinary in a largely traditional Spain, focusing her work on those marginalised in society. She wrote not only extensively on the state of prisons for both men and women, but also on the role of women in society in works such as La Mujer del Porvenir [The Woman of the Future] (1869), The education of women, The current state of women in Spain, The work of women, La mujer de su casa [The woman of the house] (1883) and Domestic service. It is this work which made her known as the founder of the feminist movement in Spain.

A monument to Concepción Arenal was erected in 1934 in Madrid, and the Library of Law, Political Sciences and Labour Relations of the University of Santiago de Compostela bears her name. Ideologically, Arenal was a reformist deeply rooted in Christian doctrine.

== Bibliography ==
- Arenal, Concepción (1851). Fabulas en verso originales [Original fables in verse] (in Spanish). Madrid: Tomas Fortanet.
- —— (1861). La beneficencia, la filantropía y la caridad [Beneficence, philanthropy and charity] (in Spanish).
- —— (1865). Cartas á los Delincuentes [Letters to offenders] (in Spanish). Coruña: Imp. del Hospicio, a cargo de D. Mariano M. y Sancho.
- —— (1867). El reo, el pueblo y el verdugo, o, La ejecución pública de la pena de muerte [The inmate, the people and the executioner, or the public execution of the death penalty] (in Spanish). Madrid: Estab. Tip. de Estrada, Díaz y López.
- —— (1869). La mujer del porvenir [The woman of the future] (in Spanish). Seville: Eduardo Perié.
- —— (1881). La instrucción del pueblo [The instruction of the people]. Memorias presentadas en la Real Academia de Ciencias Morales y Políticas (in Spanish). Madrid: Real Academia de Ciencias Morales y Políticas.
- —— (1883). La mujer de su casa [The woman of the house]. Memorias presentadas en la Real Academia de Ciencias Morales y Políticas (in Spanish). Madrid: Gras y Compañía.
- —— (1895). Estudios penitenciarios [Prison studies] (in Spanish). Madrid: Libr. de Victoriano Suárez.

== Related articles ==
- Plaza de Concepción Arenal
