= José Millán-Astray =

Spanish soldier and commander

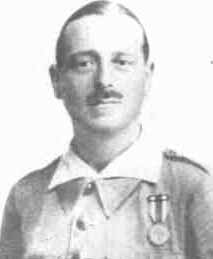
- José Millán-Astray as a young officer
- Born: 5 July 1879; A Coruña, Kingdom of Spain
- Died: 1 January 1954 (aged 74); Madrid, Francoist Spain
- Spouses: Elvira Gutiérrez de la Torre (m. 1906; sep. 1941) Rita Gasset (m. 1941)
- Children: Peregrina Millán-Astray
- Relatives: Pilar Millán Astray
- Military career
- Allegiance: Kingdom of Spain (1894–1931); Spanish Republic (1931–1936); Spanish State (1936–1954)
- Branch: Spanish Army
- Service years: 1894–1932 (officially); 1936–1945 (in administrative capacity)
- Rank: Brigadier General
- Nickname: "The glorious amputee" (el glorioso mutilado)
- Commands: Spanish Legion
- Conflicts: Philippine Revolution; Spanish–American War; Rif War; Spanish Civil War
- Awards: Cruz de María Cristina; Cruz Roja al Mérito Militar; Cruz Primera Clase al Mérito Militar

José Millán-Astray y Terreros (5 July 1879 – 1 January 1954) was a Spanish military officer who was the founder and first commander of the Spanish Legion. He was also a major early figure of the Francoist dictatorship.

Astray was notable for his disfigured body: during his time in the army, he lost both his left arm and right eye and was shot several times in the chest and legs.

== Early life ==
Born in A Coruña, Galicia, his father was José Millán Astray, a lawyer, poet, librettist of the Zarzuela genre, and chief jailer of Madrid. His mother was Pilar Terreros Segade, an illustrator and comedic author and his sister, Pilar Millán Astray was to be a noted writer. Though pressed to study law, Millán-Astray aspired to a military career.

On 30 August 1894 he entered the Academia de Infantería de Toledo ("Infantry Academy of Toledo"). He graduated as a second lieutenant at the age of sixteen, and later served in the army in Madrid. On 1 September 1896 he enrolled in the Escuela Superior de Guerra ("Superior Military School").

On 2 March 1906 he married Elvira Gutiérrez de la Torre, daughter of General Gutiérrez Cámara. Only after the wedding did she reveal her intention to remain celibate. From this point on, the couple would maintain (in Millán-Astray's own words) a "fraternal relationship".

== Career ==
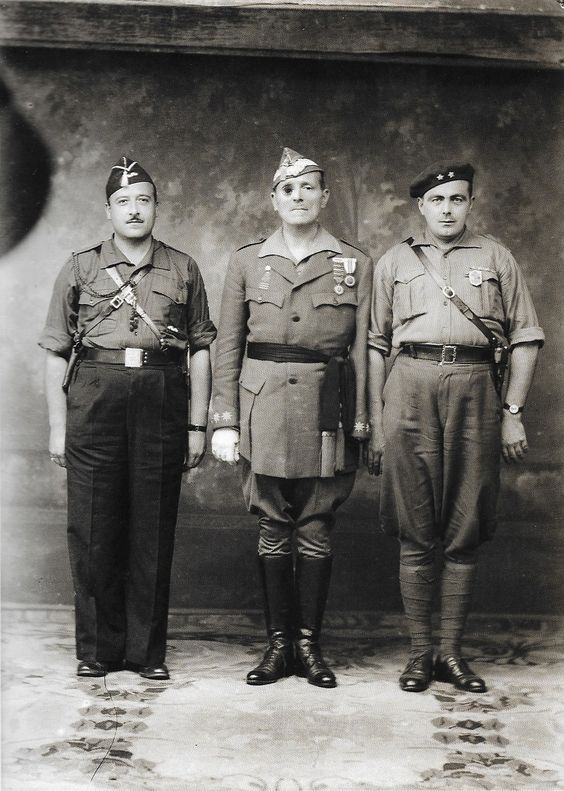
José Millán-Astray surrounded by the Falangist Antonio Ortiz de Estringana and the Carlist Lieutenant of the Requeté of Navarre D. Agustín Sánchez Echevarría, September 1936

Upon graduation, he joined the General staff of the Spanish Army. Soon after, the Philippine Revolution broke out, and he left his position to serve there as a volunteer second lieutenant. He would earn numerous decorations for his valor (Cruz de María Cristina, Cruz Roja al Mérito Militar, and Cruz Primera Clase al Mérito Militar). He subsequently served in the Rif War.

On 26 October 1924, while stationed in Spanish Morocco, he was wounded in the left arm during an ambush resulting in it needing to be amputated.

He continued leading his men and a month later, he lost his right eye when it was hit by a bullet.

This earned him the sobriquet Glorioso mutilado ("Glorious amputee"). He habitually wore an eyepatch and a white glove on his right hand when appearing in public.

Interested in forming a corps of foreign volunteers after the fashion of the French Foreign Legion, he traveled to Algeria to study its workings. With the support of then Major Francisco Franco, he created the Spanish Legion, and, with the rank of lieutenant colonel, served as its first commander. He would popularize the mottos ¡Viva la Muerte! ("Long live death!") and ¡A mí la Legión! ("To me the legion!").

Millán-Astray gave the legion a powerful ideology intended to evoke Spain's Imperial and Christian traditions. For instance, the legion adopted a regimental unit called the tercio in memory of the famed Spanish infantry formations that had terrorized their opponents on the battlefields of Europe in the 16th and 17th centuries. Millán-Astray also revived the Spaniard's ancient feud with the Moors and portrayed his men first as crusaders on an extended Reconquista against the Islamic civilization; and later as the saviours of Spain warding off the twin evils of Communism and democratic liberalism. Favored by King Alfonso XIII and rewarded for his heroic leadership of the Legion in the aftermath of the Spanish military defeat at Annual, in 1924, he was promoted to full colonel. In 1927, he was promoted to brigadier general. In 1932, the Republican government of Azaña placed him on the retirement list along with other generals regarded as hostile to the Republic.

During the Spanish Civil War he sided with the Nationalists. He served as director of the Office of Radio, Press, and Propaganda (1936-1937) on the Nationalist side and later (1937) was named head of the Corps of Wounded Veterans. It is said that he administered the press office like a military barracks, forcing journalists to fall in line in response to his whistle, and subjecting them to the same brutal harangues he had given as commander of the Legion.

== Confrontation with Unamuno ==
Millán-Astray is perhaps best remembered for a heated response to Miguel de Unamuno, the writer and philosopher, on 12 October 1936. The celebration of 12 October had brought together a politically diverse crowd at the University of Salamanca, including Enrique Pla y Deniel, the Archbishop of Salamanca, and Carmen Polo Martínez-Valdés, the wife of Franco, and Millán-Astray himself.

Unamuno had supported Franco's uprising because he believed it necessary to bring order to the anarchy created by the Popular Front, and that day he was representing General Franco in the event. By then the Republican Government had removed Unamuno from his perpetual rectory at the Salamanca University and the rebel government had restored him.

There are different versions of what occurred.

=== The Portillo/Thomas version ===
According to the British historian Hugh Thomas in his magnum opus The Spanish Civil War (1961), the evening began with an impassioned speech by the Falangist writer José María Pemán. After this, Professor Francisco Maldonado decried Catalonia and the Basque Country as "cancers on the body of the nation," adding that "Fascism, the healer of Spain, will know how to exterminate them, cutting into the live flesh, like a determined surgeon free from false sentimentalism."

From somewhere in the auditorium, someone cried out the Spanish Legion's motto "¡Viva la Muerte!" [Long live death!]. As was his habit, Millán Astray, the founder and first commander of the Spanish Legion, responded with "¡España!" [Spain!]; the crowd replied with "¡Una!" [One!]. He repeated "¡España!"; the crowd then replied "¡Grande!" [Great!]. A third time, Millán Astray shouted "¡España!"; the crowd responded "Libre!" [Free!] This—Spain, one, great, and free—was a common Falangist cheer and would become a francoist motto thereafter. Later, a group of uniformed Falangists entered, saluting the portrait of Franco that hung on the wall.

Unamuno, who was presiding over the meeting, rose up slowly and addressed the crowd:

You are waiting for my words. You know me well, and know I cannot remain silent for long. Sometimes, to remain silent is to lie, since silence can be interpreted as assent. I want to comment on the so-called speech of Professor Maldonado, who is with us here. I will ignore the personal offence to the Basques and Catalans. I myself, as you know, was born in Bilbao. The Bishop,

Unamuno gestured to the Archbishop of Salamanca,

whether you like it or not, is Catalan, born in Barcelona. But now I have heard this insensitive and necrophilous oath, "¡Viva la Muerte!", and I, having spent my life writing paradoxes that have provoked the ire of those who do not understand what I have written, and being an expert in this matter, find this ridiculous paradox repellent. General Millán Astray is a cripple. There is no need for us to say this with whispered tones. He is a war cripple. So was Cervantes. But unfortunately, Spain today has too many cripples. And, if God does not help us, soon it will have very many more. It torments me to think that General Millán Astray could dictate the norms of the psychology of the masses. A cripple, who lacks the spiritual greatness of Cervantes, hopes to find relief by adding to the number of cripples around him.

Millán Astray responded: "Death to intelligence! Long live death!" provoking applause from the Falangists. Pemán, in an effort to calm the crowd, exclaimed "No! Long live intelligence! Death to the bad intellectuals!"

Unamuno continued: "This is the temple of intelligence, and I am its high priest. You are profaning its sacred domain. You will win [venceréis], because you have enough brute force. But you will not convince [pero no convenceréis]. In order to convince it is necessary to persuade, and to persuade you will need something that you lack: reason and right in the struggle. I see it is useless to ask you to think of Spain. I have spoken." Millán Astray, controlling himself, shouted "Take the lady's arm!" Unamuno took Carmen Polo by the arm and left under her protection.

=== The Severiano Delgado version ===
In 2018, the details of Unamuno's speech were disputed by the historian Severiano Delgado, who argued that the account in a 1941 article by Luis Gabriel Portillo (who was not present at Salamanca) in the British magazine Horizon may not have been an accurate representation of events.

Severiano Delgado, a historian and librarian at the University of Salamanca, asserts that Unamuno's words were put in his mouth by Luis Portillo, in 1941, possibly with some help from George Orwell, in a piece in the literary magazine Horizon, entitled Unamuno's Last Lecture. Portillo had not witnessed the event.

Severiano Delgado's book, titled Archeology of a Myth: The act of 12 October 1936 in the auditorium of the University of Salamanca, shows how the propaganda myth arose regarding the confrontation that took place that day between Miguel de Unamuno and the general Millán Astray.

Delgado agrees that a "very fierce and violent verbal confrontation" between Unamuno and Millán Astray definitely occurred, which led to Unamuno being removed from his rectorship, but he thinks that the famous speech attributed to Unamuno was invented and written by Luis Portillo."

Delgado says that:

What Portillo did was to come up with a kind of liturgical drama, where you have an angel and a devil confronting one another. What he wanted to do above all was symbolise evil—fascism, militarism, brutality—through Millán Astray, and set it against the democratic values of the republicans—liberalism and goodness—represented by Unamuno. Portillo had no intention of misleading anyone; it was simply a literary evocation.

Unamuno took the floor, not to confront Millán Astray, but to answer a previous speech by Professor of Literature Francisco Maldonado who had identified Catalonia and the Basque Country with the "antiespaña" (Antispain). Unamuno himself was Basque and was revolted with Francisco Maldonado's speech, but when addressing the audience, Unamuno used the example of what had happened with José Rizal (a Filipino nationalist and polymath during the tail end of the Spanish colonial period of the Philippines, executed by the Spanish colonial government for the crime of rebellion after the Philippine Revolution). Millán Astray had fought in the Philippines and it was the reference to José Rizal that annoyed Millán Astray, who shouted "The traitoring intellectuals die".

As proof that the incident was nothing more than a crossroads of hard words, the photograph reproduced on the cover of his book shows Millán Astray and Miguel de Unamuno calmly saying goodbye in the presence of Bishop Plà, with no tension between them. The photo was discovered in 2018 in the National Library and was part of the chronicle of the act that the newspaper "The Advancement of Salamanca" published the following day, 13 October 1936.

According to Delgado, Portillo's account of the speech became famous when a then very young British historian Hugh Thomas, aged 30, came across it in a Horizon anthology while researching his seminal book, The Spanish Civil War, and mistakenly took it as a primary source.

== Reputation ==
Millán-Astray was by all accounts prone to actions and general demeanor frequently described as impulsive and ruthless, even by the standards of most Africanist officials. There is no conclusive evidence concerning the causes of these actions, which could be prompted by environmental conditioning, his alleged drug use, or undiagnosed medical conditions.

== Later life ==
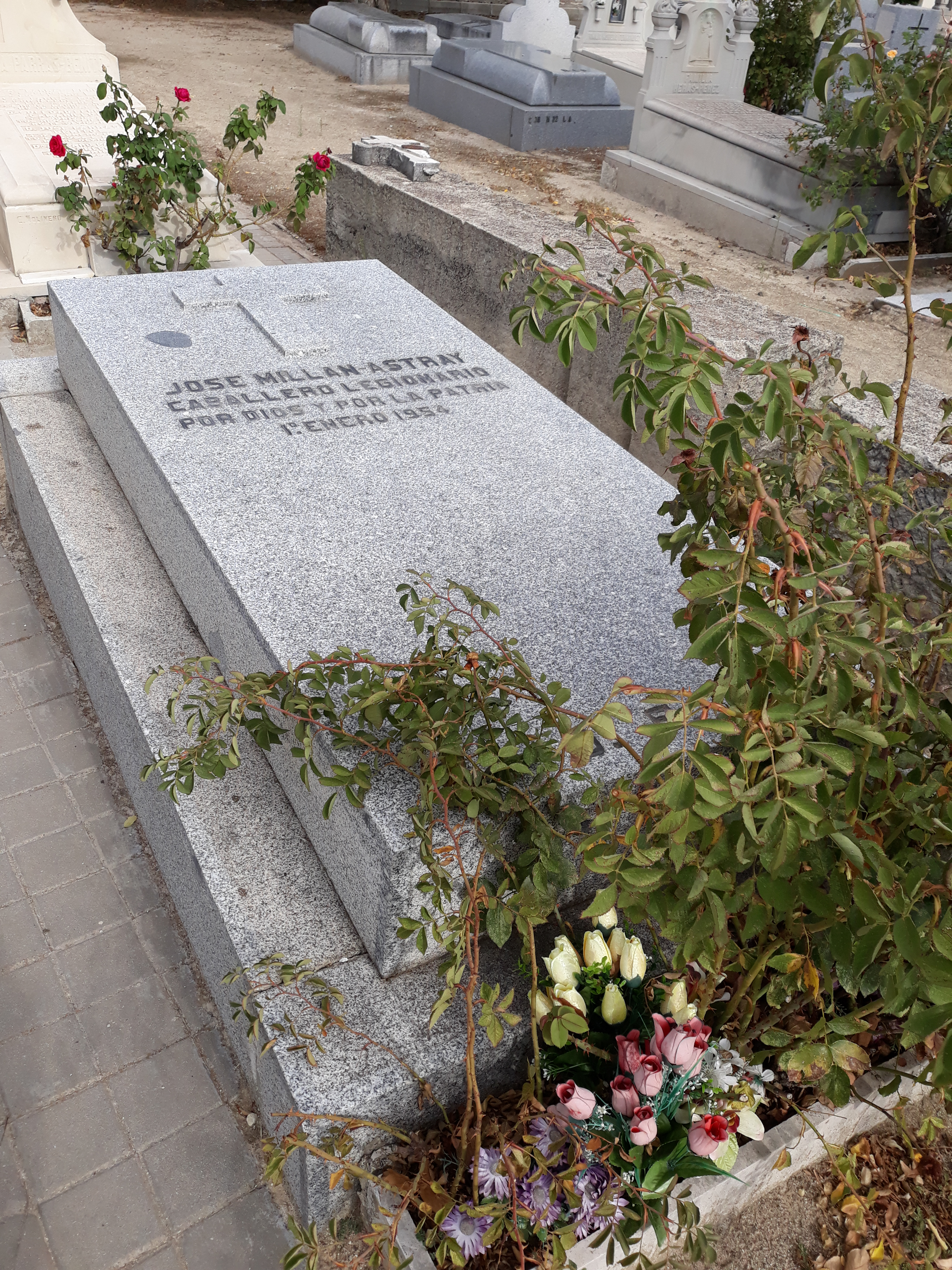
Gravestone of José Millán-Astray in the Cementerio de la Almudena.

In 1941, during a game of bridge, he fell in love with Rita Gasset, daughter of former public works minister Rafael Gasset, and cousin of philosopher José Ortega y Gasset. As a result, Millán-Astray separated from his wife Elvira. Franco, seeking to avoid a scandal, relocated Millán-Astray to Lisbon. Here, Rita gave birth to Millán-Astray's only child, a daughter named Peregrina, on 23 January 1942.

After the affair, Millán-Astray was largely forgotten by the Spanish public. He eventually returned to Madrid, where he died of heart failure on 1 January 1954.

== Legacy ==
For over 50 years a street in Madrid was named in his honour. In 2018, as part of a wider removal of street names linked to Francoism, it was renamed Justa Freire in memory of a jailed opponent of Francoism. In August 2021, a Madrid court ruled that the previous name was not incompatible with the Historical Memory Law as it commemorated his military achievements which predated Francoism and the street was restored to its former name of General Millán-Astray on 24 August 2021. Six days later, the street name was vandalised.

== Sources ==
- Delgado Cruz, Severiano (2019). Arqueología de un mito: el acto del 12 de octubre de 1936 en el paraninfo de la Universidad de Salamanca [Archeology of a myth: the act of 12 October 1936 in the auditorium of the University of Salamanca] (in Spanish). Sílex. ISBN 978-8477378723.
