= Pilar Millán Astray =

Spanish writer and playwright

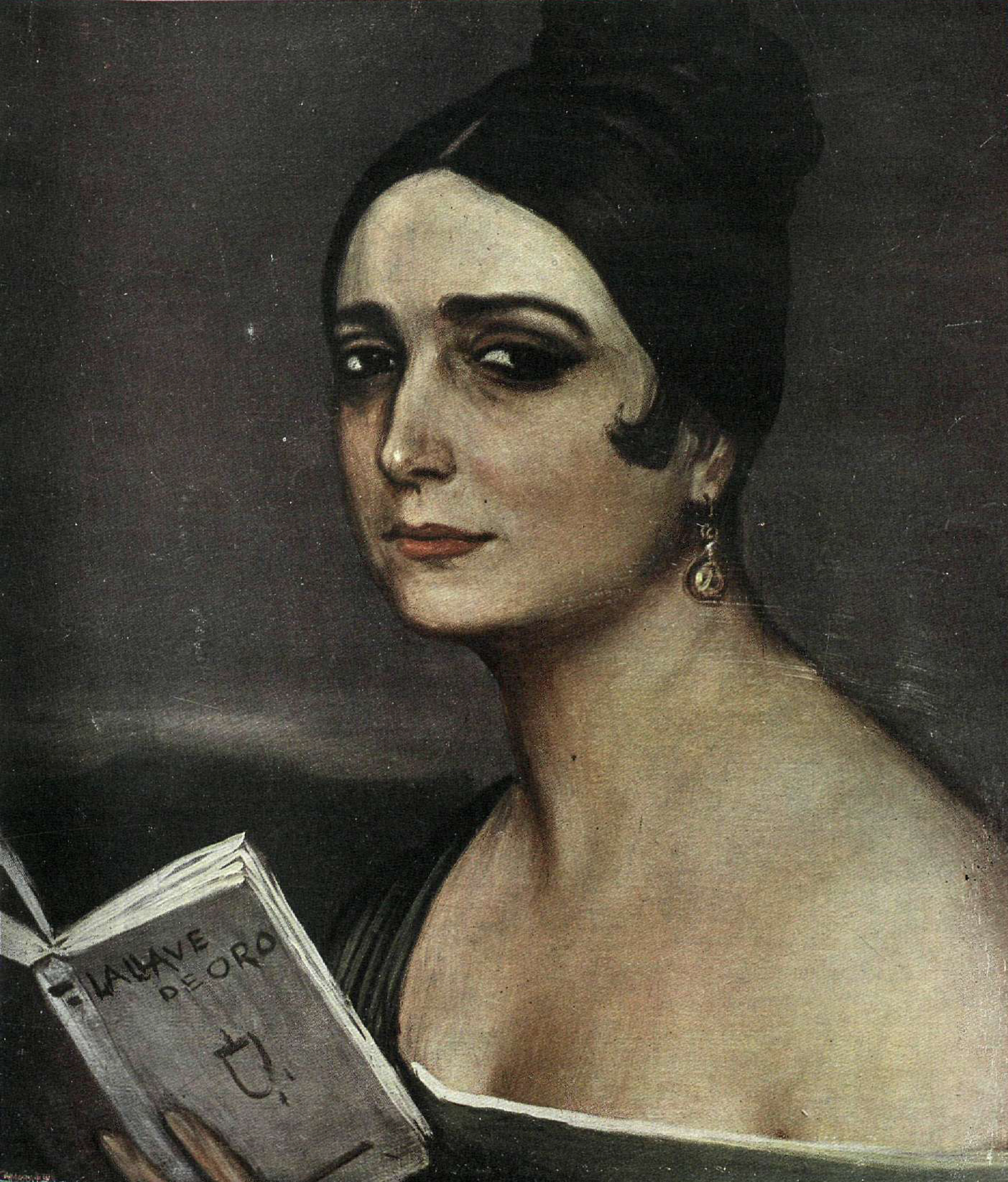
- by Julio Romero de Torres
- Born: 1879; A Coruña
- Died: 22 May 1949 (aged 69–70); Madrid
- Relatives: José Millán-Astray
- Writing career
- Genres: plays and books

Pilar Millán Astray (1879 – 22 May 1949) was a Spanish writer and playwright. Recent research shows that she was a spy for the Germans before World War I and her literary success. She was later imprisoned for her fascist views and it is said that she suffered from the misogynistic regime that she had helped bring to power.

== Life ==
Astray was born into a privileged life in A Coruña. Her parents were José Millán Astray and Pilar Terreros. Her brother (also) José Millán-Astray was a Spanish general and the founder of the Spanish Legion. She married and had three sons Javier, Carmen and Pilar.

She encouraged her three sons during World War I to work for German espionage in Barcelona according to historian Fernando García Sanz. The most important character spied on was the British Ambassador to Spain Sir Arthur Henry Hardinge. The German's representative, Alberto Hornemann, paid 1,000 pesetas for each document handed over.

Her husband died in 1919 and her resulting literary career flourished. She was awarded the White and Black prize in 1919 for her novel La Sister Teresa. She also wrote for La Nación, El Espectador and El Sol newspapers.

Jacinto Benavente encouraged her to write her first play The Roar of the Lion in 1923. Other plays included La galana, Una chula de cor and La tonta del bote . The latter was a great success and it ran for 310 days. The cover of her comedy bookThe haberdashery of the red dahlia contains a portrait of her by Julio Romero de Torres.

During the Second Spanish Republic she led the Muñoz Seca Theater in Madrid.

Astray supported the military when they revolted in July 1936. She was imprisoned in Alicante. Also in prison were Rosario Queipo de Llano, Carmen Primo de Rivera or Pilar Jaraiz Franco. In 1940 she published her prison writing in her book Imprisoned. 32 months in red prisons (1940) which featured poetry on fascist and catholic themes. She stopped writing plays and this has been said to have been caused by the misogynistic regime - that she had helped to bring to power. The imprisonment damaged her health and she died when she participated in a tribute to the actress Josita Hernán in Madrid in 1949.

In 1970 her play, The Complete Idiot, was made into a film. It was a remake of a film of the same name released in 1939.
