= Muñoz Seca Theater =

Theatre in Madrid

Muñoz Seca Theater Teatro Muñoz Seca
- Salón Chantecler; Eldorado
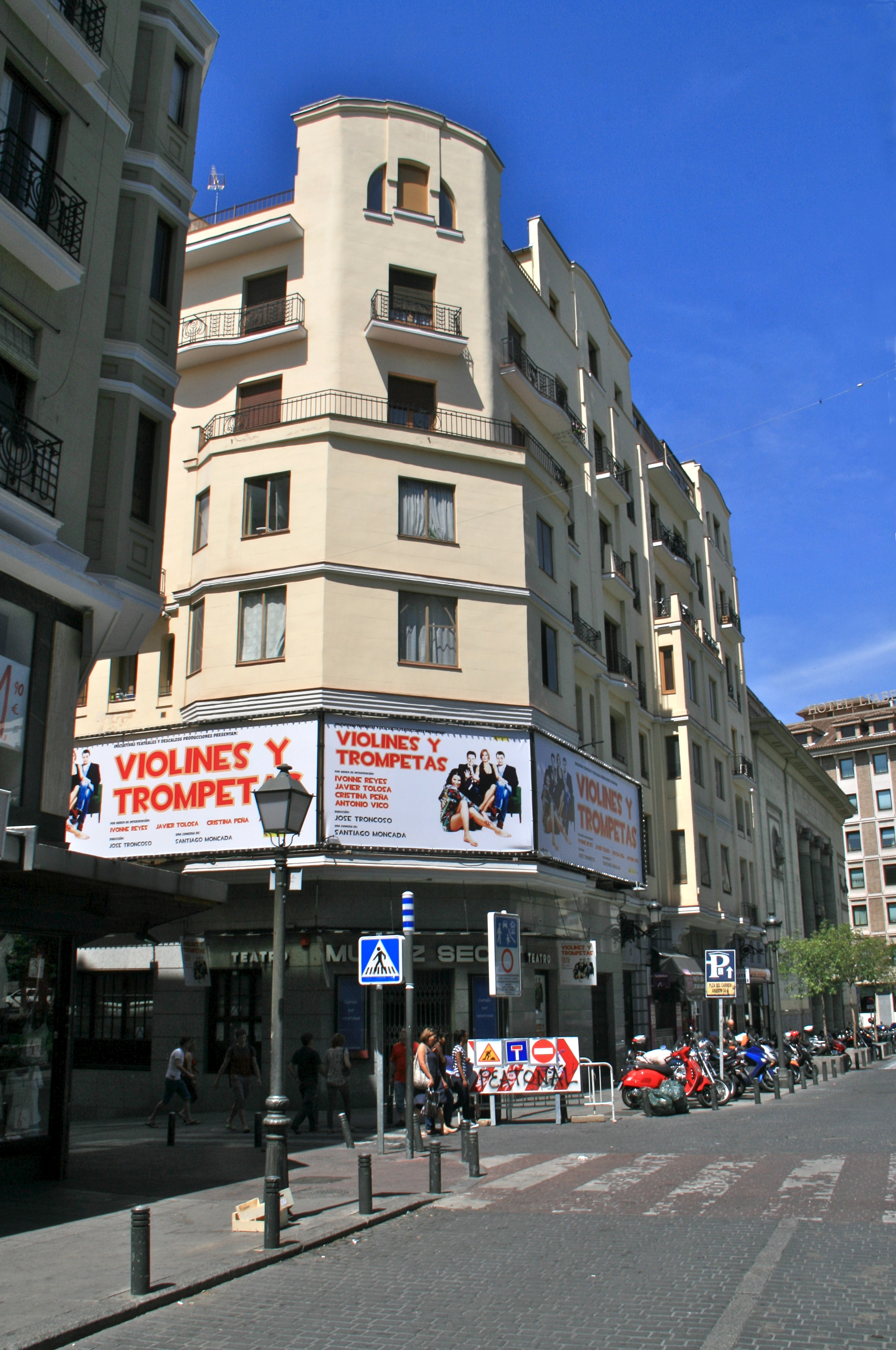

- Location in Madrid
- Address: Plaza del Carmen, 1 Madrid; Spain
- Coordinates: 40.4184°N 3.7032°W

Construction
- Opened: October 28, 1930 (as Teatro Munoz Seca)
- Architect: José Espelius Anduaga

The Muñoz Seca Theater (Teatro Muñoz Seca) is a theater in Madrid, Spain. The theater is named after playwright Pedro Muñoz Seca.

During the Second Spanish Republic Pilar Millán Astray led the theater.
