= Asociación para la Enseñanza de la Mujer =

Spanish educational women's rights organisation

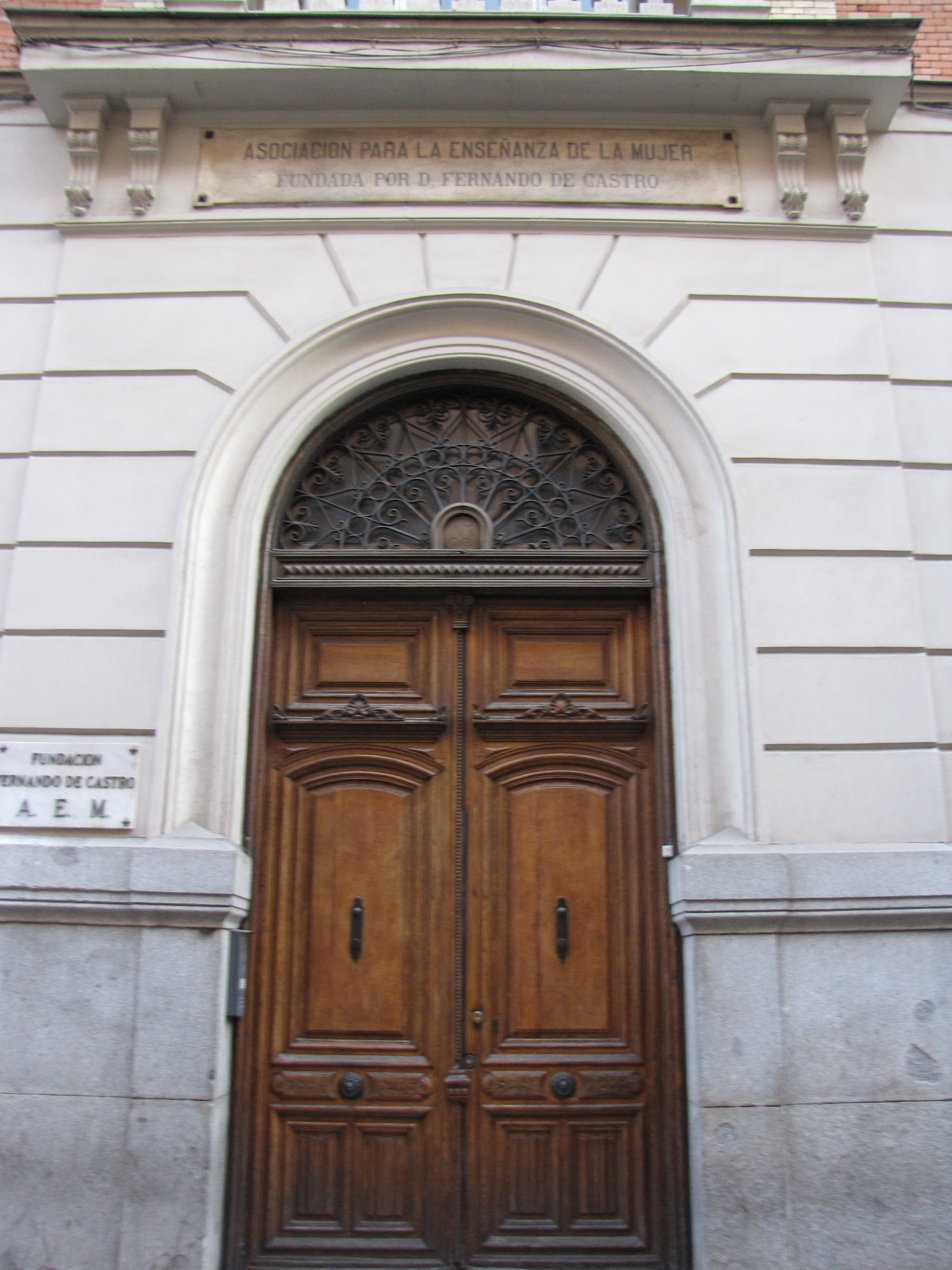
Former headquarters of the Asociación para la Enseñanza de la Mujer in Madrid

The Asociación para la Enseñanza de la Mujer (AEM, Association for the Education of Women) was a women's rights organisation active in Spain from 1870.

It was founded by the progressive educator Fernando de Castro, professor at the University of Madrid, in 1870. The purpose of the association was to make higher education available to women. The period between the deposition of queen Isabella II of Spain in 1868 and the Restoration of 1875 was a time of intense debate over the reformation of society, which also included the issue of women's rights, which was to become the starting point of the Spanish women's movement. In 1869, Fernando de Castro gave a series of lectures on education of women, in which he argued that education should be made available for women so that they too could fulfill their individual potential and help to bring forward the development of Spain in line with more developed Western nations. A popular argument was also that the perceived maternal instincts of women made them better educators. In 1869, he founded the Ateneo Artistico Literario y Senoras, which was split into the Escuela de Institutrices and the Asociación Nacional de Mujeres Españolas in 1870. Concepción Arenal, often referred to as the first women's rights activist in Spain, and Faustina Sáez de Melgar was engaged in the AEM from the start, having served in the advisory board of the Ateneo Artistico Literario y Senoras.

The AEM provided lectures to women in various subjects. As the public educational system did not offer women much education, the AM received funds from its sympathizers to create private educational institutions for women. It founded primary and secondary schools for girls as well as professional training schools for women. It founded the School of Business for Young Women in 1878, and the Postal and Telegraph School in 1883. It established itself in many different parts of Spain: it was set up in Vitoria in 1879, Málaga in 1886, and Valencia in 1888. From 1880, it was given some government support.

It also agitated through lectures, congresses and publications in favor of access of higher education for women, which was the main focus of the women's rights movement in Spain until the struggle for women suffrage begun around 1920, when Asociación Nacional de Mujeres Españolas and other suffrage organisations were founded. The AEM had impact on the pedagogic teacher's conferences, and, eventually, on educational reforms. Though individual female students were accepted before, the universities of Spain did not formally open to women until 1910.
