= Women in Francoist Spain =

Women in Francoist Spain (1939–1978) were the last generation of women to not be afforded full equality, which wouldn't be granted until the Spanish Constitution was signed in 1978. Women during this period found traditional Catholic Spanish gender roles being imposed on them, in terms of their employment opportunities and role in the family. For Republican women, Francoist Spain was a double loss, as the new regime first took away the limited political power and identities as women which they had won during the Second Spanish Republic (1931–1939), and it secondly forced them back into the confines of their homes. Motherhood would become the primary social function of women in Francoist Spain.

Feminism in Spain would be co-opted by the regime, encouraging not liberation, but instead the engagement of pious domesticity. The Castilian Association of Homemakers and Consumers was unique in this period, for trying to co-opt the regime to support women's liberation from the inside.

Some women in the Communist Party of Spain would support violence against the state through armed resistance. Other women found themselves in prisons. Pregnant women in prison often had their children kidnapped by the state, in order for them to be placed in families that supported the government line. Many Republican women went into exile in this period, with a number of them working to support other women in the same position.

== Background ==
Francoist Spain was a quasi-fascist state whose ideology rejected what it considered the inorganic democracy of the Second Republic. It was an embrace of organic democracy, defined as a reassertion of traditional Spanish Roman Catholic values that served as a counterpoint to the Communism of the Soviet Union during the same period. It came into existence in 1939 following the end of the Spanish Civil War. Misogyny and heteronormativity were linchpins of fascism in Spain, where the philosophy revolved around patria and fixed gender roles that praised the role of strong male leadership. For women, the end of the Civil War represented a loss and an introduction of a repressive regime specifically targeting them.

The fascist ideology entered as a framework to justify Franco's actions in overthrowing the Second Republic with a grounding in support of Falange española, which was created by José Antonio Primo de Rivera in 1934, with Franco assuming leadership of the party in April 1937. Franco used his status as head of Falange to become Caudillo, fashioning himself as a political and spiritual leader who led the country in a Crusade against the secular forces of the Second Republic. The regime sought legitimacy through propaganda efforts, involving reclaiming elements of Spain's past. This included citing of Jerónimo Merola's 1587 work, República original sacada del cuerpo humano. It also borrowed from the works of Spanish intellectuals including Joaquin Costa, Angel Ganivet, and José Ortega y Gasset. It also tried to tie in modern Catholicism, and works such as Pius XII's Mystici corporis Christi published in 1943. This process was part of an effort to create the perception of a new Golden Age for Spain.

Spain was described during the mid-1950s as an example of the Leonine Ideal, and had support from Pope Pius XII in Rome. Pius XII was anointed Pope only a month before the end of the Spanish Civil War. Franco sent a telegram to Pius XII to congratulate him on his election, with the telegram being published in the daily monarchist newspaper ABC. Both Franco and Pius XII were vehemently anti-atheist Communist in their world views.

== Timeline ==
The truth of the Spanish women's experience in this period is not one experience, but many that continually juxtapose upon each other where various stories about their experiences have been highly politicized.

=== 1930s ===
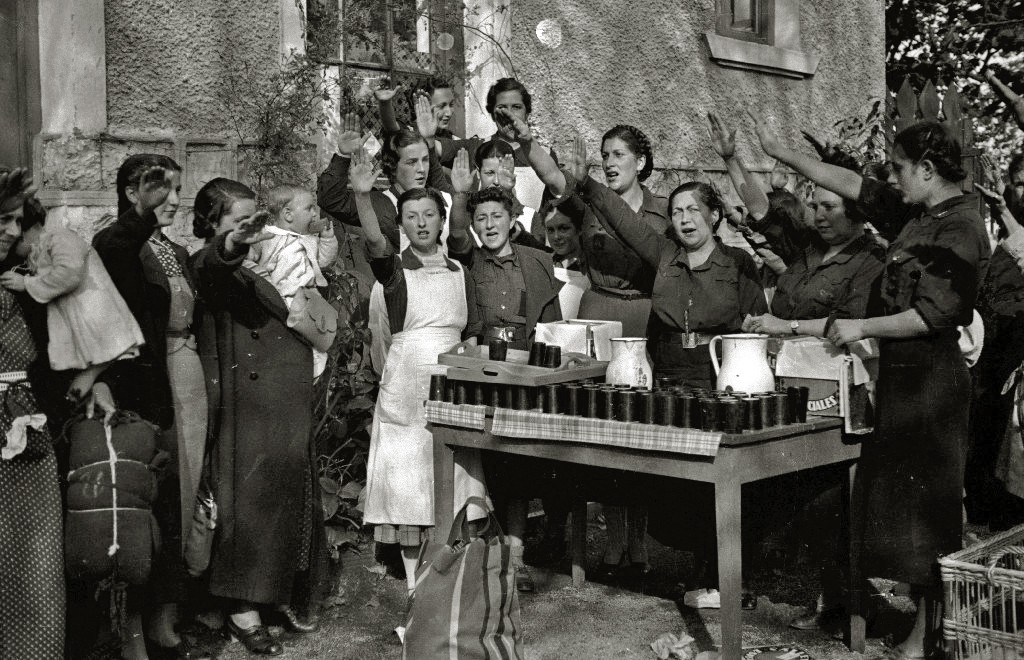
Women of the Sección Femenina deliver food to needy women in Guipuscoa (1937). All the adults do the Roman salute.

As a consequence of the Spanish Civil War, over a million Spaniards died, another million were forced into exile and an unknown number disappeared. Franco's regime would continue Civil War based reprisals until the end of World War II, with an estimated 200,000 people being executed by the regime or died in prison in that period for their alleged Republican links. Adolf Hitler provided support for Franco during the Spanish Civil War.

In the first days of the Francoist period, it was a crime to be a mother, daughter, sister or wife of a "red", and this could be punished with long prison sentences or death.

Women were subjected to economic reprisals by the regime. In Galicia, around 14,600 people were victims of such reprisals. Mother of a Republican A Gudiña mayor, Florinda Ortega Pérez was one such victim. The government confiscated her business and all her property, along with fining her 10,000 pesetas. This bankrupted her and forced her into exile.

Eugenics in Spain in the late 1930s and through to the 1940s was not based on race, but instead on people's political alignment with the regime. Ricardo Campos said, "the racial question during the Franco era is complex." He went on to say, "despite the similarities of the Franco regime with the Italian and German fascism and the interest that the eugenics provoked, the strong Catholicism of the regime prevented its defense of the eugenic policies that were practiced in the Nazi Germany." Campos went on to say, "it was very difficult to racialize the Spanish population biologically because of the mixture that had been produced historically." Vallejo-Nágera in his 1937 work, "Eugenics of the Hispanicity and Regeneration of the Race" defined Hispanicness around spirituality and religion. The goal was the "strengthening psychologically" of the phenotype. Because Catholicism was opposed to negative eugenics, the only way to fight the degradation was through repression of abortion, euthanasia and contraception. Doctors in Francoist Spain had two roles: to be moral protectors of Spanish reproduction and to provide science based medical services. This put male doctors in charge of women's birth control. When medical doctors in the Second Republic and early Francoist period defended birth control, it was on the eugenics grounds that it protected the health of both women and children, especially as it related to the spread of genetic disease and the spread of tuberculosis and sexually transmitted diseases.

Most of the resistance in Spain during the early Franco period was a result of guerrillas, who coordinated their activities in the interior both with political militants in exile and with militants in prison. Most of Spain's militant women who remained in Spain were in prison or had gone underground where they served as important figures in coordinating activities between all three groups. Prisons in this case proved invaluable for many militant women as they allowed them to rebuild their activist networks or create new networks. They were also one of the biggest sources of female resistance to the Franco regime by exercising daily resistance behind prison walls.

=== 1940s ===
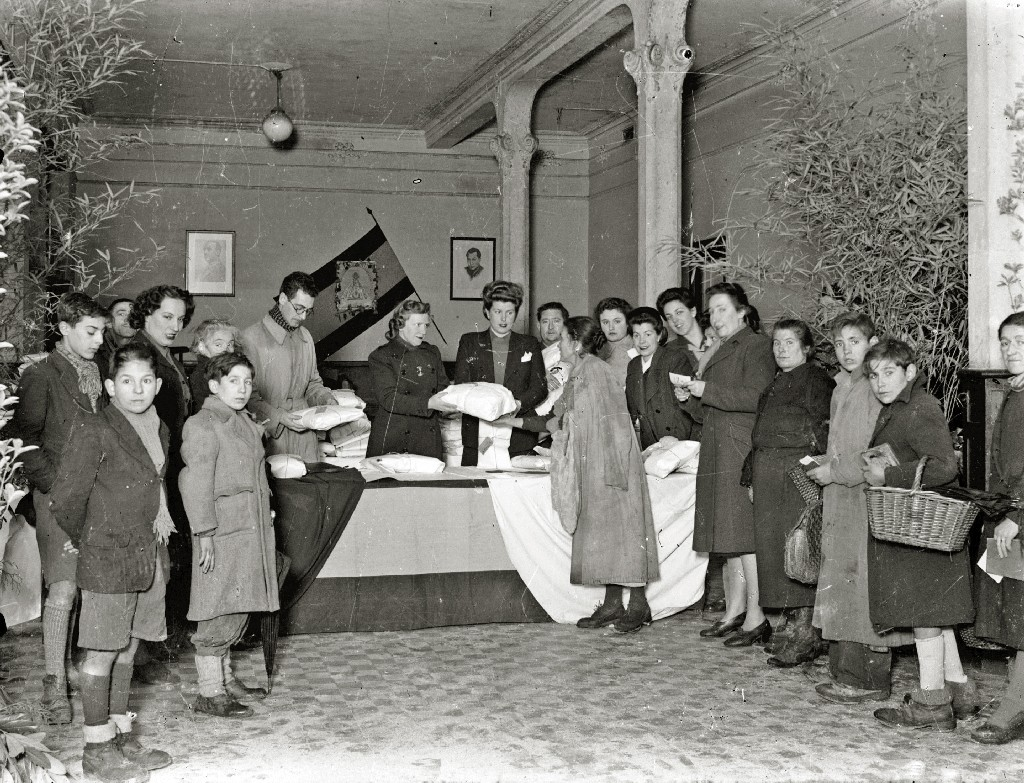
Women of the Sección Femenina distribute lots to the needy. The portraits of Franco and José Antonio and the Spanish flag can be seen in the background.

The 1940s and 1950s were a dark period in Spanish history, where the country was still recovering from the effects of the Spanish Civil War, where the economy was poor and people suffered a huge number of deprivations as a result of the loss of life and the repressive nature of the regime which sought to vanquish any and all remaining Republican support by going after anyone who had been affiliated with or expressed any sympathies towards the Second Republic.

The end of World War II meant Franco felt threatened by the extinction of other European fascist regimes on the continent. To ensure his and the regime's continued existence, he took more further steps to purge outward fascist elements. This resulted in increased lack of coherence for the regime's fascist based ideology. Steps included referring to the government as autoritarismo or régimen conservador de desarrollo ("conservative regime of development"), merging fascist organizations like Falange with more traditional, Catholic organizations to repress Falange's more overt fascist elements, and by not trying to portray the regime as aggressive towards other nations.

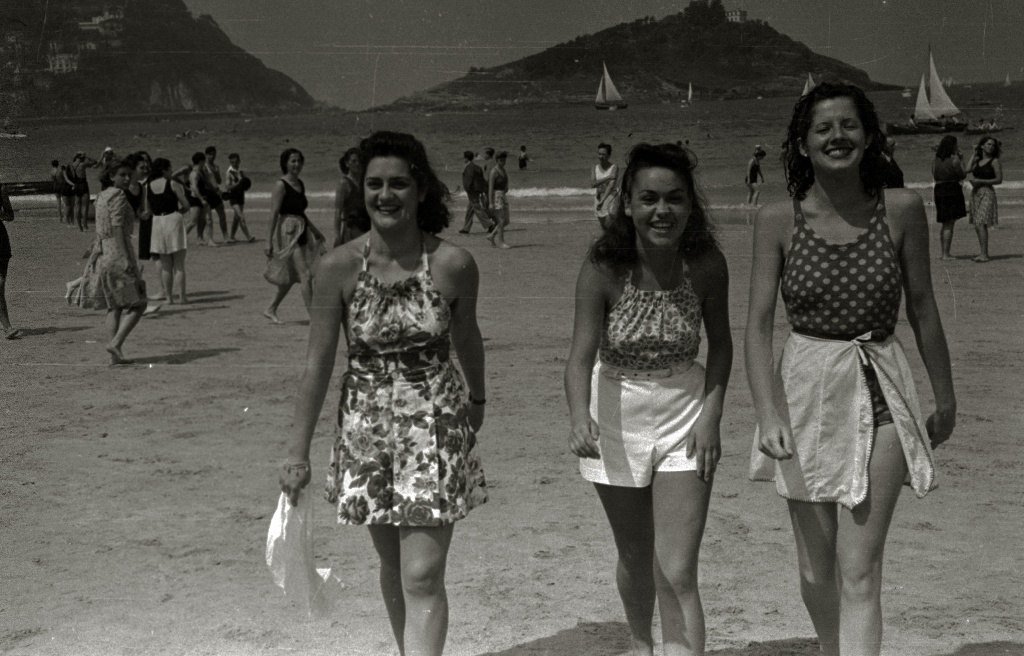
Bathers in San Sebastián (1940).

Most women in the 1940s were not politically active, involved with guerrilla groups or militants. They were women dealing with hardship, poverty and the imposition of gender norms that imposed on their everyday lives. Their process of coping and surviving often made their personal activities intersect with activism as they subtly challenged the regime and limits imposed by the regime. Women in the Cortes Españolas provided negligible contributions to the body during the 1940s and 1950s, these women would be more influential during the 1960s and 1970s as Spain's economy changed and broader Spanish culture demanded contradictory and complex things from women as the regime tried to keep the changing culture in line with its fascist ideology.

During the Franco period, families of dead and disappeared Republicans were prohibited from mourning publicly. They could not retrieve bodies. They could not give them headstones. They could not wear mourning garb. They could not cry about the loss of their loved ones in public. All grief was only allowed in the private domain, and often centered around photographs the family had of their dead and missing. Photos became a source of comfort, dignity and resistance. They were passed down from generation so families would not forget their histories.

Women were generally not part of the founding of guerrilla groups operating in the 1940s. They were brought in later, as part of a disaffected class, through personal and political contacts. Almost all women involved with guerrilla groups were from rural areas and had family involved. This differed from the previous period, where many fighters came from the middle class and urban areas. One group women belonged to was Agrupación guerrillera de Levante y Aragón (AGLA).

In the 1940s, women were barred from a number of professions. These included being a magistrate, diplomat, notary, customs officer, stock broker, and prison doctor. This was because women's primary job was to be a homemaker.

From the 1940s to the 1980s, families, religious figures, strangers could all report women and girls to the authorities for violating female morality. Girls and young women could then be imprisoned without a trial in the infamous Board for the Protection of Women's reformatories. Examples of reasons women were incarcerated included "having gone with the comparsas of film artist Marisol" and "not obeying her mother. She likes the street a lot and does not want to work." In Barcelona during the 1940s, women had to be accompanied by men such as fathers, brothers or husbands if they wanted to be out on the street at night; they could not go out unaccompanied. Internal Spanish women migrants found life in Spain difficult during the 1940s, 1950s and 1960s as Francoist policy dictated they remain in the home. Unlike their husbands who could new develop social connections through outside employment, immigrant women were isolated having left behind their previous social support networks.

During the 1940s, the number of women in Málaga for crimes related to food acquisition sentenced to Caserón de la Goleta increased. The city itself had a severe food shortage and typhus was common. Women would get to the prison and happily suck on orange peels because that was more than was available on the streets of Málaga. The prison would not protect them from typhus and other diseases which continued to spread throughout the prison where women were put six to a room designed for two. During the 1940s and 1950s, Francoism said prisoners could be redeemed by the Church. Consequently, promulgating the faith was often made a condition of release. One rule required that for prisoners with children to receive subsidies, they needed to be married. As a result, many women got married behind bars and had their children baptized as Roman Catholics.

The most popular novels written by women in the 1940s and 1950s were romance novels (Spanish: novelas rosas), outselling all other types of women's writings. These were not serious literary works, but were intended for mass consumption. The 1940, 1950s and 1960s were a period where the broader male dominated literary establishment refused to take women's literary efforts seriously. Francisco García Pavón asked in an interview about women's writings, "Are women's arms too weak for the oars of a great novel?" to which he basically answered yes. Consequently, there was very little serious criticism of women's writings and an erasure of their efforts in the immediate post war period. When their works were criticized, they were often compared only to works of other women in the past and found wanting. Some criticism in literary publications would comment on a female writers appearance, while taking very little note of her actual writings. When good women writers like Carmen Nonell were recognized, they were recognized in ways that sought to erase their gender.

=== 1950s ===
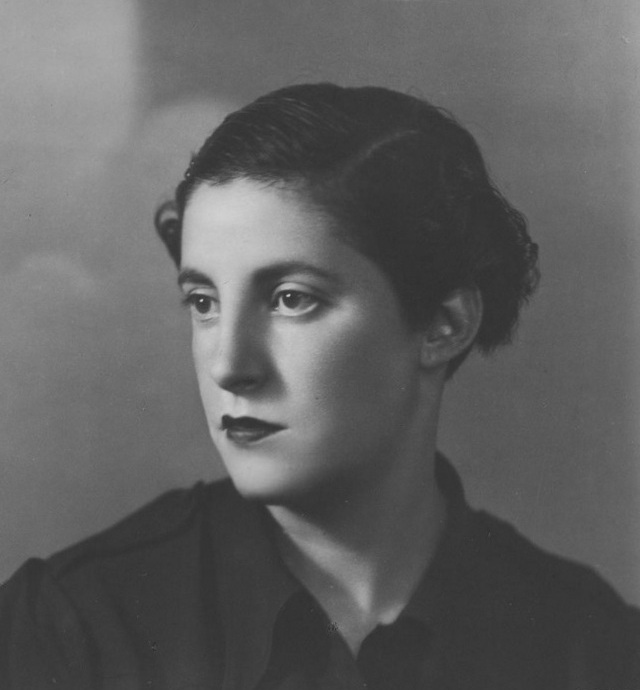
Pilar Primo de Rivera as head of the Sección Femenina and sister of the late José Antonio was the most powerful woman in the Francoist bureaucracy.

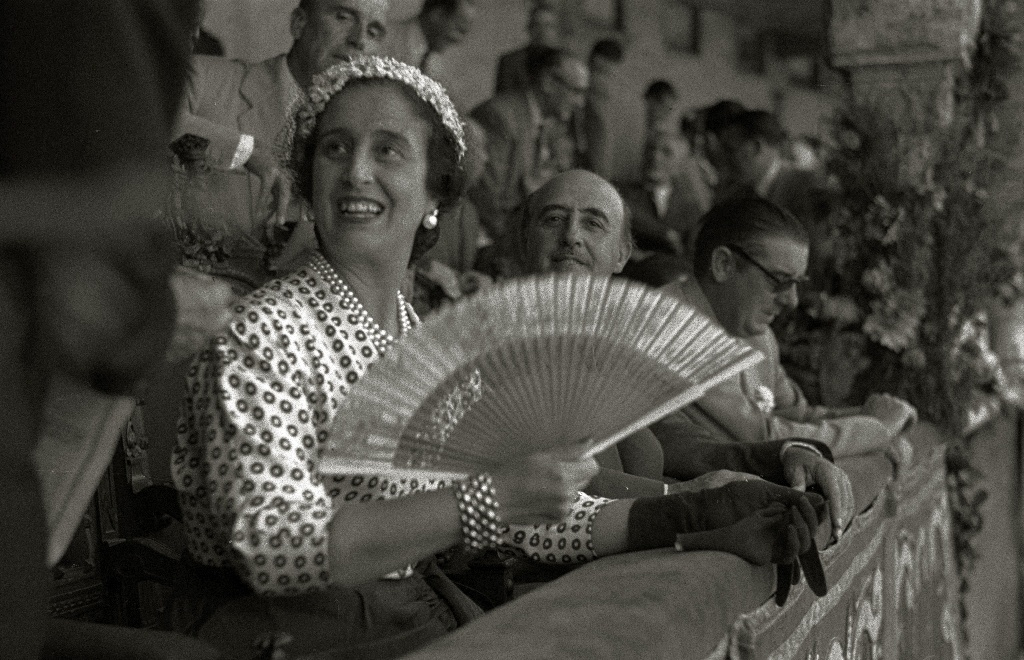
Carmen Polo, Franco's wife attends a bullfight in San Sebastián in 1950.

Until the mid-1950s, Spain was crippled by an economic crisis coupled with a government imposed repressive society and culture that demanded uniformity and compliance. Starting in the 1950s, Spain started adopting a more consumerist economy. This would continue on into the 1960s and would play a role in introducing Spanish women to the new modern Western woman. This introduction would result in the eschewing of the concept of True Catholic Womanhood. The 1950s saw mass migration of people from the countryside to the city. The regime began to adapt their ideology to deal with this new urban reality. Many women made such moves with the hope that they could be more anonymous and avoid accusations of small towns of being "reds".

Prohibitions against the sale of contraception in Andalusia in the 1950s, 1960s and 1970s were largely ineffective as women had various means to try to limit the number of children they had. This was especially true for women engaging in sex outside of marriage at a time when that practice, along with having children when single, were highly condemned by the government. Women were willing to take risks to have sex for pleasure by using some form of birth control. For many married Andalusian women in the 1950s, 1960s and 1970s, there was a certain fatalism about the fact they would inevitably become mothers. It was difficult for them to try to negotiate family planning with their spouses. Starting in the 1950s, foreign movies in Spain presented women with images of beautiful and glamorous women who had their own agency. This image conflicted with the state presented image, which demanded women surrender agency to their husbands and fathers and become mothers. These movies also served to bring Spanish women out of their international isolation. They also helped feed a Spanish consumerist culture that challenged the regime.

During the 1950s, tourists started to visit Spanish beaches en masse. They wore mini-skirts and bikinis, and played an important role in changing Spanish women's perceptions of other women in that these clothes did not signify a woman was a prostitute.

The 1950s saw a diminishment of the importance of the Women's Section as their role in shoring up the economy and producing propaganda for national unity were less needed. In response, it switched to become more clearly a social welfare arm of the state. The organization lost much of its political influence and position within the Francoist structure. Its survival was largely because of their involvement in education and no other organization offered women of this period the same level of opportunities. Pilar Primo de Rivera was viewed by many inside the regime as a critical player in successfully encouraging Franco to relax restrictions for women during the 1950s and 1960s.

=== 1960s ===
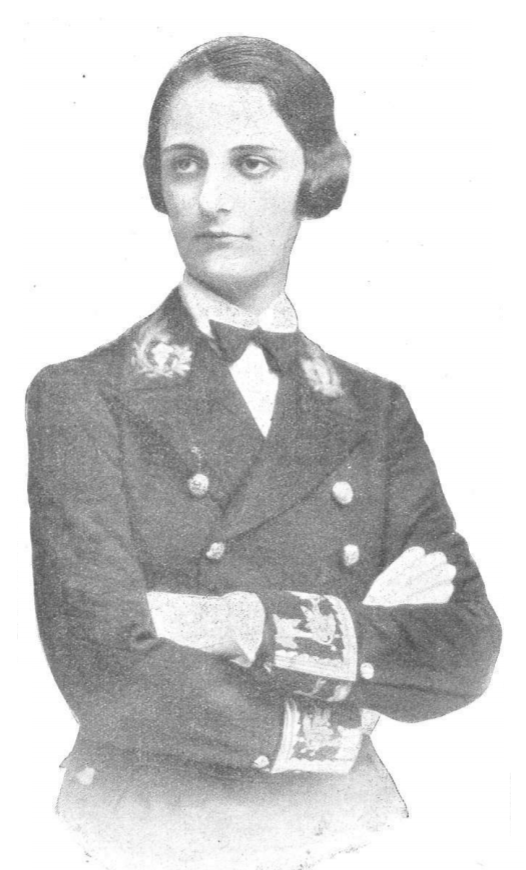
Pilar Careaga (depicted in 1932), the first woman with an engineer title in Spain. After rising within Falange, she was designated as mayor of Bilbao in 1969, the first woman mayor in Francoism.

By the 1960s, Francoist Spain had changed its definition of Catholic womanhood. Women were no longer only biological organisms existing for the sole purpose of procreation, but as beings for whom Spanish cultural meaning rested.

Despite contraception being illegal, by the mid-1960s, Spanish women had access to the contraceptive pill. Women could be prescribed the pill by their doctors if they were married and could make a case that they had a gynecological problem which the pill could fix, but this reason could not be a desire to avoid being pregnant.

The 1960s marked an economic shift in Spain, as the country moved from an agrarian based economy of the rural countryside to an industrial based economy of the cities. This necessitated the introduction of women on a large scale into the Spanish workforce. The 1960s saw the same inequalities of the past, with most of the economic gains going towards the bourgeois while the poor were left destitute and unable to strike for better working conditions. Parts of rural Castile and still lacked roads, electricity and running water.

Starting in the 1960s, women's groups and feminists organizations began to emerge. Women's associations were tolerated by the regime but were not completely legal. During the 1960s and 1970s, the Women's Section aided in raising expectations of what was possible for women to accomplish by taking personal responsibility for their actions.

By the end of the 1960s, the destiny of women in Spain was changing as women increasingly began to express their dissatisfaction with state imposed patriarchy. Their dissatisfaction would play a large role in the later collapse of the regime following Franco's death.

=== 1970s ===
The high-profile quarrels among leftist women and increasingly involvement of male dominated political organizations led to the creation in the 1970s of third-wave radical feminism in Spain, that was both similar and notably dissimilar to their American counterparts of the same name by being more explicitly socialist and politically focused on class in their orientation. These women would found Partido Feminista (PF) and Seminario Colectivo Feminista, an organization founded in 1976 as a result in a split inside PF.

Socialist Unión General de Trabajadores and Communist Comisiones Obreras were the two leading underground clandestine unions during the 1960s and 1970s. Women were involved with UGT as part of their opposition to the regime. Women were arrested and tortured for their involvement in the Francoist period. Security officers would insult women, questioning their status as both women and mothers.

In the Basque Country, both Basque and Spanish women would remain socially isolated until the 1970s when younger women began to push their way inside the dominant culture. This included going to bars and restaurants. Female internal migrants in the Basque country began to be accepted as more Basque than those who had lived in the region for generation, in part because they were more willing to become politically engaged on discussions of Basque nationalism. This political awakening also enabled these women to become more active in efforts to counter the regime.

Because abortion was illegal in Spain, during the 1970s, Spanish women who could afford it went to London to get abortions. Between 1974 and 1988, 195,993 Spanish women traveled to England and Wales to get an abortion. Women also went to the Netherlands in this period to have abortions. France was not an option, as at the time it required women who had abortions to be French residents and have resided in the country for at least three months. Women then needed to wait a week to reflect before they could get an abortion. An unknown number of women went to North Africa and Portugal for abortions.

During the early and mid-1970s, the Supreme Court of Spain received a large number of appeals from women over their adultery convictions. A man with the initials of MDL was convicted on 15 October 1976, and successfully was granted her appeal a year and a half later. The Supreme Court said in granting the appeal, "nothing is said in the judgment appealed regarding the fact that the defendant had knowledge of the woman's marital status." Another woman who had a relationship was less fortunate, with the Supreme Court dismissing her appeal despite her claim that she had permission of her husband. The court said in rejecting the appeal, "there was no consent, because although the husband knew the behavior of his wife, he could not exercise the action while the guilty lived abroad." A man and a woman appealed their 14 September 1973 adultery conviction on the grounds of marital separation on the part of the woman. The Supreme Court rejected this, saying, "as long as the marriage is not annulled or the current legality is modified, the marriage bond subsists and its ethical and fidelity duties remain."

Divorce in the late Franco period and early transition period was available via ecclesiastical tribunals. These courts could nullify marriage for a fee. Consequently, they were mostly only available to the rich. The Civil Courts would only be involved in separation procedures at the provisional level. The Catholic Church was actively opposed to civil divorce in the mid and late 1970s.

== Employment ==
Women who had been behind Republican lines found themselves locked out from a number of professions just because of where they had lived. This included civil service jobs, teaching positions, journalism jobs, and places in professional organizations. It was not until later labor shortages that laws around employment opportunities for women changed. These laws passed in 1958 and 1961 provided a very narrow opportunity, but an opportunity, for women to be engaged in non-domestic labor outside the household.

== Gender roles ==
The end of the Civil War, and the victory of Nationalist forces, saw the return of traditional gender roles to Spain. This included the unacceptability of women serving in combat roles in the military. Where gender roles were more flexible, it was often around employment issues where women felt an economic necessity to make their voices heard. It was also more acceptable for women to work outside the home, though the options were still limited to roles defined as more traditionally female. This included working as nurses, or in soup kitchens or orphanages. Overall though, the end of the Civil War proved a double loss for Republican women, as it first took away the limited political power and identities as women they had won during the Second Republic and it secondly forced them back into the confines of their homes.

With strict gender norms back in place, women who had found acceptable employment prior and during the Civil War found employment opportunities even more difficult in the post war period. Teachers who had worked for Republican schools often could not find employment.

Gender norms were further reinforced by Sección Femenina de Falange. Opportunities to work, study or travel required taking classes on cooking, sewing, childcare and the role of women before they were granted. If women did not take or pass these classes, they were denied these opportunities.

== Role in the family ==
Motherhood became the primary social function of women in Francoist Spain. Still, while motherhood played this critical societal role, it was one the regime only wanted to see perpetuated among those who shared in their political ideology. Children of mothers with leftist or Republican leanings were often removed from their care in order to prevent mothers from sharing their ideology with their offspring.

A law passed on 30 March 1940 meant Republican women could keep their children with them in prison until the child turned three years old. At this point, children were then put into state care to prevent the contagion of Republican thinking from spreading. The number of children removed from Republican mothers between 1944 and 1954 was 30,960. These children were not allowed to remain in contact with their families, and many found themselves in centers run by Auxilio Social. When mothers were released from prisons, they were often watched to make sure they were good mothers as defined by the state. Actively surveilled, many women lost custody of new children they had.

Republican mothers abroad addressed the problem of specifically being targeted by Franco's regime by created the Unión de Mujeres Españolas (UME) in France. The purpose of the organization was to legitimize political activity of mothers as being part of the broader efforts of "female consciousness." UME published a magazine called Mujeres Antifascistas Españolas. The publication linked Republican women in exile with those in Spain, including some who were in prison. It honored women's roles as front line combatants, and suggested the special role of motherhood made their voices more valuable when it came to speaking out against the problems of the Franco regime. This contrasted to the beliefs of Spanish Communist women in exile, which suggested mothers in this period should fade into the background, serving in roles that supported single women and men who could be more visible in the struggle against Franco. Communists emphasized a traditional view of motherhood espoused by Franco.

== Feminism ==
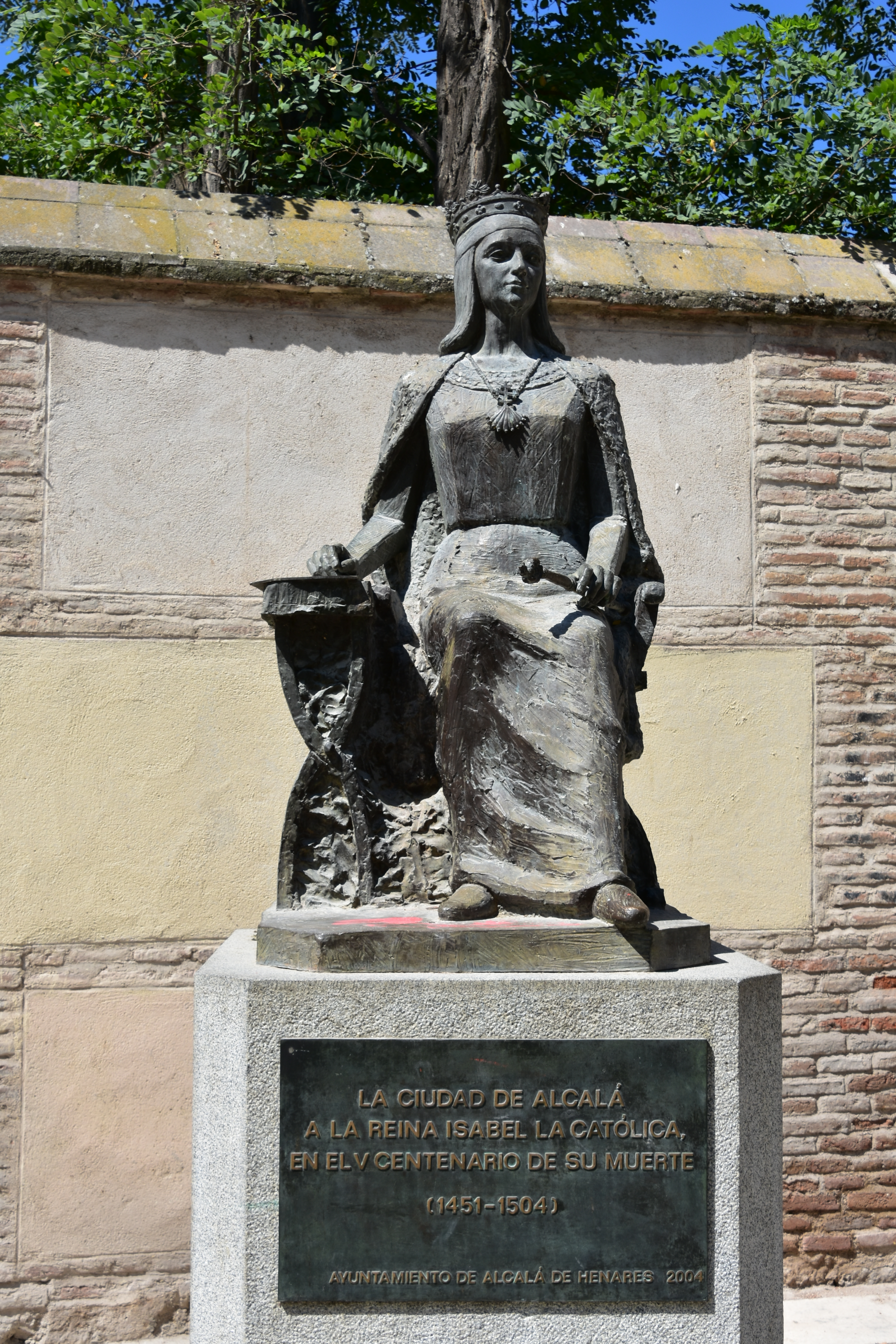
Statue of Isabel the Catholic in Alcala de Henares.

Sección Femenina de Falange worked to depict feminism as a form of depravity. It associated feminism with drug abuse and other evils plaguing society. State supported feminism, expressed through Sección Femenina, offered Isabel the Catholic and Teresa of Avila as symbols for Spanish women to look up. They had first been used by Francoist women during the Civil War, and reminded women that their role was to become mothers and to engage in pious domesticity.

Sección Femenina did things like creating agricultural and adult schools, sports centers and libraries. They organized cultural groups and discussion groups. They published their own magazine. They worked to preserve traditional rural life. All of this was done with the underlying goal of encouraging traditional womanhood, of remaining in the home as a good daughter, and later as a good wife and mother. The pride that women got in completing these domestic tasks associated with Sección Femenina's teachings has been described by Guiliana Di Febo as Christian feminism.

Some feminists in Franco's Spain tried to subvert government goals and change policy by becoming directly involved in government institutions. The Castilian Association of Homemakers and Consumers was one organization that attracted the type of feminist that believed that change should come from within. They became regime accepted vehicles for female dissent.

== Women's rights ==
The ideological pillars for a New Spain in the Franco era became national syndicalism and national Catholicism. The Franco period saw an extreme regression in the rights of women. The situation for women was more regressive than that of women in Nazi Germany under Hitler. The legal status for women in many cases reverted to that stipulated in the Napoleonic Code that had first been installed in Spanish law in 1889. The post Civil War period saw the return of laws that effectively made wards of women. They were dependent on husbands, fathers and brothers to work outside the house. Women needed permission to do an array of basic activities, including applying for a job, opening a bank account or going on a trip. The law during the Franco period allowed husbands to kill their wives if they caught them in the act of adultery.

In March 1938, Franco suppressed the laws regarding civil matrimony and divorce that had been enacted by the Second Republic. The 1954 Ley de Vagos y Maleantes saw further repression directed at women, specifically those who were lesbians. The law saw many lesbians committed, put into psychiatric institutions and given electroshock therapy.

== Political organizations and activists ==
The Franco regime banned all political parties and trade unions. The only permissible type organization was Falange, founded by José Antonio Primo de Rivera in 1933. Pilar Primo de Rivera headed the women's section, following its founding that same year as an auxiliary of the main organization.

Franco created an appointed Cortes Españolas in 1942. The inaugural sitting included two women, Pilar Primo de Rivera and Mercedes Sainz Ortiz de Urbina. Thirteen total women would go on to serve in ten different sessions. Franco appointed four of them. While they provided negligible contributions to the body during the 1940s and 1950s, these women would be more influential during the 1960s and 1970s as Spain's economy changed and broader Spanish culture demanded contradictory and complex things from women as the regime tried to keep the changing culture in line with its fascist ideology.

An election was held in 1966, where people were given the option to affirm or deny Franco's leadership. With more voters than electors, Franco was affirmed as Head of State.

The Communist Party of Spain became the dominant clandestine political organization in Spain following the end of the Civil War. It would retain this position until the death of Franco saw PSOE replace it. Women were involved with the party, helping to organize covert armed resistance by serving in leadership roles and assisting in linking up political leaders in exile with those active on the ground in Spain. During the later parts of the war and at its conclusion, some women from POUM were coerced into making false confessions in Moscow courtrooms, and then sent to Soviet prisons. Their major crime was being Trotskyites. It was only during the 1950s and 1960s that some of those women involved with POUM and Trotskyite purges began to re-evaluate their role in them; their change of hearts only occurred after Stalinist Communism lost its prestige among leftist circles.

One of the goals of the Women's Section was to use fascist ideology about the role of women and Falange's teachings in a woman's individual agency to attract leftist women who were seeking to enjoy some semblance of the freedoms they had enjoyed during the 1920s and 1930s. They did this in part through educational efforts and providing a political outlet.

The Women's Section of Falange represented the elite women of Spain.

Partido Feminista de España was founded in 1975 by Lidia Falcón, constituted in 1979 in Barcelona and registered in 1981.

== Prison ==
By the end of the war, the Nationalist run women's only Las Ventas Model prison in Madrid had over 14,000 women. Many of these women in prison were raped by guards and were pregnant. This had swollen the size of the prison to include a further 12,000 Republican child prisoners. From there, at the orders of Antonio Vallejo Nágera, these children were removed from their mothers and put into orphanages in order to prevent them being contaminated by "Marxist fanaticism."

María Topete Fernández was part of prison leadership at the Prison for Nursing Mothers in Madrid. Held up as a model for being the first of its kind in Europe, the prison had problems with infant mortality. While the Law of Maternal and Infant Health in June 1941 reduced infant deaths by a small fraction, imprisoned Republican women would not see improved rates until 1943, and significant improvement until 1952 when the prison's rationing system was abandoned.

== Milicianas ==
The end of the Civil War, and the victory of Nationalist forces, saw the return of traditional gender roles to Spain. This included the unacceptability of women serving in combat roles in the military. After the war, many milicianas faced difficulties. This included the general population being subjected to a propaganda war that ridiculed their involvement in the conflict. At the same time, the new government sought them out to put them in prison or torture them. Many fighters were also illiterate, and found this to be restrict later activities. This was coupled with restrictions placed on some when in exile in France that limited their opportunities. For those who remained politically active, they had to deal with open sexism in the Communist Party and in anarchist circles.

Some milicianas never retired. They instead continued active violence against the state as part of communist and anarchist cells, using terrorism like tactics. This included bombing Guardia Civil positions, robbing banks and attacking offices of Falanage. Women involved with this resistance effort included Victòria Pujolar, Adelaida Abarca Izquierdo and Angelita Ramis. These women, and women like them, served as go betweens for exiled leaders in France and those on the ground in Spain. They worked with Communist Party leaders to plan attacks.

== Exiles ==
Following the collapse of Republic in 1938 and the establishment of recognition of the Nationalist government in February 1939, many women went into exile. Women in refugee camps in France often found themselves in squalid conditions. Pregnant women had few facilities to give birth and they were often poorly suited. Swiss aid worker Elizabeth Eidenbenz arrived to the camps on the frontier in December 1939, and immediately set about improving maternity services. In the period between December 1939 and February 1944, the facilities she helped to establish saw 597 births of Spanish, Polish and Jewish women. Eidenbenz assisted many of the women in getting papers and visas for themselves and their children. Despite better facilities, many things could not be done including cesarian sections. As a consequence, infant mortality rates remained high, with many newborns dying within weeks of their birth.

== Women's media, writing and art ==
Margarita Nelken, María Martínez Sierra and Carmen de Burgos had all been pre-Civil War feminist writers. Following the war, their work was subjected to strict censorship. Spanish feminists in Spain in the post Civil War period often needed to be active in exile. Works produced by these writers including Nada by Carmen Laforet in 1945 and La mujer nueva in 1955, Primera memoria by Ana María Matute in 1960. Writings of some foreign feminists did find their way to Spain, including the Le deuxième sex published in French in 1947 by Simone de Beauvoir. Inside Spain, well connected, often aristocratic Spanish feminists were sometimes able to publish their works for domestic consumption by 1948. This includes works by María Lafitte, Countess of Campo Alanaga, and Lilí Álvarez. Works by Republican pre-war feminists like Rosa Chacel and María Zambrano, who continued to write from exile, also saw their works smuggled into Spain.

Following the war, many women artists went into exile because of their leftist leanings. Those who remained often had to deal with censorship of their work by the Franco government. British Surrealist Leonora Carrington traveled to Spain in 1940, seeking to find her partner Max Ernst who had left Germany was on the run from the Gestapo. Her trip happened only months after the Civil War officially ended, and the arrest of Ernst precipitated a mental breakdown that eventually saw her put into an asylum in Santander after her father and the British government agreed. While there, she was regularly dosed with Cardiazol and restrained naked over a six-month period. She was eventually released, and then went to Lisbon.

== Catholicism and women's morality ==
Up until the mid-1960s, Spain was one of the most conservative Catholic countries in Europe. This conservative Catholicism intruded into many aspects of women's lives.

Starting in the 1950s, Spain started adopting a more consumerist economy. This would continue on into the 1960s and would play a role in introducing Spanish women to the new modern Western woman. This introduction would result in the eschewing of the concept of True Catholic Womanhood. By the 1960s, Francoist Spain had changed its definition of Catholic womanhood. Women were no longer only biological organisms existing for the sole purpose of procreation, but as beings for whom Spanish cultural meaning rested. The Second Vatican Council held from 1962 to 1965 assisted in reshaping Catholic discourse around the definition of womanhood. These conversations often found themselves in contradiction to traditional Francoist teachings. By 1970, many liberal and socialist women had left the Catholic Church in Spain. These women joined clandestine political organizations and trade unions. Women also stopped becoming nuns, with a 30% decrease in the number of women in convents from the previous decade.

Acción Católica was a lay organization, often in competition with Sección Feminina. Their teachings were not ideologically grounded in fascist thinking, but in Catholic teachings that portray the world as a battleground between good and evil. Consequently, their mission was to insure rigid following of Catholic teachings. Women were gender segregated from men in the organization, and were also further divided by age. As lay participation was often led by male priests, this limited the potential daily contact Spanish women could have with the organization. Acción Católica helped organize moral crusades specifically targeting lay Catholic women.

Hermandad Obrera de Acción Católica and Movimineto Apóstolico Social were women dominated Catholic organizations that would serve as a potent potential inside threat to the regime through their organization of women. Catholic Action Women's Youth and Catholic Women's Confederation were also church led organizations women could participate in. At the same time, these organizations were primarily about maintaining women's morality.

Religious orders, including many women run ones, played an out sized role in running prisons or other institutions holding people opposed to the regime. The nuns of the order Evangelical Crusades of Christ the King were created during the Spanish Civil War with the purpose of monitoring Republic prisoners. The nuns of the order Evangelical Crusades of Christ the King continued their work during the Franco regime by running the Trinitat Vella women's prison in Catalonia. Women were in the prison for a variety of mostly female specific crimes, including 30% who were there for having an abortion and 50% for violating the Social Danger Law. The nuns enacted a regime policy of reeducation with the intention of assisting "fallen women who wanted to recover their dignity."

The behavior and attitude of the women was subject to special vigilance and the condemnations of women for behaviors considered "morally unacceptable" were not uncommon, which usually entailed humiliation and marginalization. And not only "adulteress" women or those who had aborted were excluded, but also those who had been victims of rape or sexual abuse. To carry out this task of controlling female morality, the so-called Patronato de Proteccion a la Mujer was created, within the Ministry of Justice, whose objective was to defend "good customs" and attend to "the victims of vice", seeking its "Repentance and re-Christianization". She also played an important role in setting the subordinate status of women in the Women's Section.

Spanish women were taught that it was acceptable for their boyfriends to have sex with foreign women, called suecas, as a way of preserving their own purity. Suecas were considered different than prostitutes because they were not affiliated with traditional brothels where men were historically introduced to sex. For religious women in the Francoist women, they did not go to church during their period.

The Catholic Church, for its part, endeavored to impose traditional values in both the private and public spheres, with a particular concern to monitor and condemn any behavior or attitude of women that could lead to "sinful intentions". So he applauded the abolition of co-education in the schools, and also, and in part, it was proposed, the separation by sexes in the swimming pools and on the beaches and that certain types of swimsuits and bathrobes were used after the bath -in 1951 the first Congreso Nacional de Moralidad en Playas, Piscinas y márgenes de ríos. The ecclesiastics were also concerned about the feminine dress – for which they gave strict instructions on skirts, sleeves, necklines or stockings – and the "modern" dances, "the root of countless sins and offenses against God," according to the bishop of Ibiza, and "favorite fair of Satan", according to Cardinal Pedro Segura, archbishop of Seville.

Sección Feminina and the Catholic Church had conflicting viewpoints on women and physical activity. Sección Feminina actively encouraged women's sports and women's physical fitness, while the Catholic Church opposed it.
