= Asociación Nacional de Mujeres Españolas =

Spanish women's rights organisation

The Asociación Nacional de Mujeres Españolas (ANME) was a women's rights organisation active in Spain from 1918 to 1936.

It was not the first women's rights movement in Spain, but was to last longer than any of its predecessors. It was founded in Madrid in 1918 by Consuelo Gonzalez Ramos and Maria Espinosa de los Monteros. Its purpose was to work for women's rights, particularly women's suffrage. It had no support from the Catholic church or any political party, and relied on contributes from sympathizers, and had its meetings on the home of its presidents. In 1919, the ANME founded the umbrella organisation Consejo Feminista de España together with the other smaller women's organisations: the Sociedad Progresiva Femenina and La Mujer del Porvenir in Barcelona, and the Sociedad Concepción Arenal and Liga para el Progreso de la Mujer in Valencia.

From 1921, it published its own paper, the Mundo Femenino.

In 1934, the organisation founded a political feminist party, the Acción Política Feminista Independiente, who tried unsuccessfully to join the leftist coalition. Both the party and the organisation was dissolved under the Spanish civil war.

== See also ==
- Asociación para la Enseñanza de la Mujer
