= Women in modern pre-Second Republic Spain =

Women in modern pre-Second Republic Spain were marginalized by society, with very few legal rights. Pre-1900s, the most important feminists were in Spain were Teresa Claramunt and Teresa Mañe, who drew inspiration from foreign feminists. Prior to the 1900, literacy rates for women were at 10%. Education for women was primarily being pushed by freethinkers. This period saw low percentages of women in the workforce, with industrialization having failed to bring women into the labor market. The most female industry with the greatest women's led labor movement was the tobacco industry.

The 1900s saw Spanish feminism begin to flourish, but different than its North American and British sisters in that Spanish feminist took on a leftist perspective. Some of the most important feminists of this period included Clara Campoamor, Virginia González and Carmen de Burgos. Partido Socialista Obrero Español would be one of the most important political parties for women in this period, though the party would continually disappoint and alienate its female members.

The World War I period saw the most active political activity around consumer related activities, like goods and services shortages, high rents and high prices of consumer goods. The first female only union was created in this period, when female tobacco workers unionized in 1918 and proved successful in doubling their wages.

Starting in the 1920s, the efforts of women to get the right to vote intensified as part of a broader western movement that saw women demanding equal rights. Women's literacy was also increasing. Socialists continued to ignore women. Communist Dolores Ibárruri joined the party and soon became the head of its Women's Commission.

== 19th century Constitutional monarchy ==
Spanish women did not hold the same status as citizens as men from 1800 to 1931. Single Spanish women enjoyed a few more legal rights than their married peers once they reached the age of 23. At that point, unmarried women could sign contracts and run businesses on their own behalf. Married women needed the approval of or involvement of their husbands to do things like change their address, accept an inheritance, and own property or a business. All women in this period were denied the right to vote or run for political office. While it was legal for men to commit adultery so long as it was not "scandalous", all forms of adultery were illegal for women and they could be imprisoned for two to six years for the offense. Divorce was also banned. Catholicism played a huge role in Spanish political thinking in nineteenth and early twentieth century Spain. The religion supported strict gender roles, which led to the repression of Spanish women and fostered ingrained sexism across the whole of Spanish society. Society, through the Catholic Church, dictated that the role of women was to marry, and bear children. They were to be invisible in society outside the domestic sphere. Violations of these norms was often met with violence. Husbands could deny women the ability to leave their homes. Families could force women into marriage against their will. Husbands could put their wives into prison for disobeying them or insulting them.

=== Women's rights ===
During the 1800s, the most important women advocating for women's rights in Spain were Teresa Claramunt and Teresa Mañé, with both women coming from the anarchist movement. They built on ideas that were being developed by the North American feminists, Voltairine de Cleyre and Emma Goldman. Spanish women were among the first to inject anarchism into feminist thinking. One of the more notable pre-Republic feminists was lawyer and prison reformer Concepción Arenal. She believed it was important for women to strive for more in life beyond the confines of her home.

The Seccion Varia de Trabajadoras anarco-colectivistas de Sabadell was founded by Claramunt and other like minded women in 1884. Working with Ateneo Obreros, the organizations sought to emancipate both men and women through education. It had folded sometime by late 1885.

Agrupación de Trabajadores was created as a labor organization in 1891 by Claramunt to support her feminist ideals, and soon organized public meetings. The organization argued that women were being doubly punished by society, as women were expected to work outside the home to provide for the family while at the same time to meet all the domestic needs of the households. The organization was never particularly successful in its goals as many women in the workforce did not see a need for representation by a union.

Belén Ságarra has been involved with the Sociedad Autónoma de Mujeres de Barcelona, an organization founded around 1891. She and Claramunt sought to create Associación Librepensadora de Mujeres. Ságarra was stopped from doing so after being arrested in 1896 for being anti-Christian and promoting free-thinking.

=== Education ===
The cultural situation in Spain resulted in a largely uneducated female population, with the literary rate for women only at 10% in 1900. The number of women known to have university titles in the period between 1800 and 1910 was around one, with María Goyri being the exception among Spanish women. When education was offered to women, it was with the goal of improving their performance in their domestic roles.

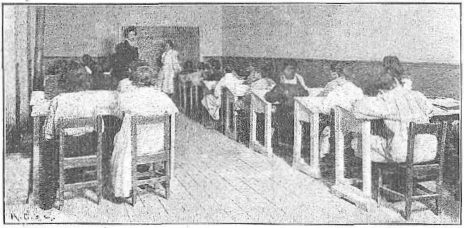
A mathematics class organized by Institución Libre de Enseñanza in 1903 with a female teacher.

The Institución Libre de Enseñza (ILE) was founded by persecuted Spanish intellectuals, and catered to freethinkers in educational facilities removed from government control. The ILE would be important in forming ideologies that would lead to the creation of the Second Spanish Republic. The ILE was revolutionary in Spain in that it was one of the first organizations to recognize the potential of women, though this potential was still viewed as limited. To this end, ILE member Fernando de Castro, then dead of the Universidad de Madrid, created the "Sunday Lectures for the Education of Women" in 1868.

=== Political activity and labor organization ===
While 17% of women worked in 1877, most were peasants who were involved in agriculture. Despite industrialization in Spain and because of the industrialization of agricultural in the 1900s, restrictive gender norms meant only 9% of women were employed by 1930. This represented a drop of 12% of all women and 0.5 million total women in the workforce from 1877 to 1930. Prostitution was legal in pre-Second Republic Spain, and poor, white women had to fear being trafficked as slaves.

Despite the lack of presence in the workforce, women did engage in labor protests in specific industries where they were over represented. This included labor action in Madrid in 1830, where there was five days of rioting over wage reductions and unsafe working conditions by 3,000 female tobacco workers. Despite their involvement in labor organizing in tobacco, women were otherwise largely absent from late nineteenth century labor movements in Spain.

The nineteenth century saw for the first time the emergence of a true middle class in Spain. This precipitated internal questioning among the Spanish elite about social inequalities that had existed in Spain since the founding of the modern Spanish state when Isabella of Castille married Ferdinand of Aragon, solidifying Spanish territory under one government. These discussions would see the creation of the First Spanish Republic from 1873 to 1874.

The year 1919 marked the first time that attempts were made to mobilize conservative women in Spain, with the Acción Católica de la Mujer (ACM). Following its creation, women were involved in efforts to defy the government when it came to laws that challenged the supremacy of Catholicism in Spain.

==== Partido Socialista Obrero Español (PSOE) ====
Spanish Socialist Workers' Party (Spanish: Partido Socialista Obrero Español) (PSOE) was founded in 1879 as primarily a labor movement organization. Its early pre-1900s membership was almost exclusively male, and they had no interest in gender issues.

=== Childbirth and life expectancy ===
Infant mortality rates were very high in the late 1800s and early 1900s, and many children in Spain were born out of wedlock. Life expectancy for women was low, at 35 in 1902 and rising to 50 by 1930.

== 20th century Constitutional monarchy ==
The feminism of Spain in the period between 1900 and 1930 differed from similar movements in the United Kingdom and the United States. It also tended to come from a liberal or leftist perspective. Spanish feminist intellectuals in this period included the militant socialist María Cambrils, who published Feminismo socialista. They also included Clara Campoamor, Virginia González and Carmen de Burgos.

While 17% of women worked in 1877, most were peasants who were involved in agriculture. Despite industrialization in Spain and because of the industrialization of agricultural in the 1900s, restrictive gender norms meant only 9% of women were employed by 1930. This represented a drop of 12% of all women and 0.5 million total women in the workforce from 1877 to 1930. By the 1900s, women could and did sometimes work in factory sweatshops, alongside young male workers. Most women seeking employment outside their homes worked in the homes of the more affluent in the country. These jobs paid so little that female workers often struggled to earn enough to feed themselves. When women were involved in factory work in this period, they were often paid half the wage of their male counterparts. Despite the limited opportunities for women, some did manage to get highly ranked government positions through political connections, though these were few and far between.

Women were involved in the arts and getting arts education in this period. Victorina Durán attended the Royal Academy of Fine Arts of San Fernando in Madrid between 1917 and 1926.

=== Political activity and labor organization ===
The first women's group inside Partido Socialista Obrero Español in 1902. It would not be the last. These organizations remained small and subordinate to larger, male dominated socialist groups. The early 1900s, 1910s and 1920s also saw a growth of women into the workforce in industries like nursing and education. These women also joined unions.

During this period, the Partido Socialista Obrero Español did not overall want to address women's rights as they saw the movement as bourgeois. They wanted to focus on union organization. This contrasted little from the international socialist movement, which always had problems with feminism and women's rights. The International Socialist Congress, Stuttgart 1907 issued a statement in favor of women's suffrage, but said the movement needed to come from the proletariat. The conditional support was because men believed that women's rights should only come after universal male suffrage. Including women's suffrage more openly would hinder their efforts. The limited inclusion came about as a result First International Conference of Socialist Women which was being held concurrently in the same building.

Socialist woman Lidia Falcón argued that the Socialist men's position would push women away from the party, or would result in only including women who believed in subservience to men. Falcón further argued this position would make feminists into enemies of the party, a truth that would be born out by 1921, which Socialist men decided that to stop their small efforts to promote rights of women as they did not believe it was the time to push for electoral reforms.

PSOE members of Congress of Deputies
Election	Seats	Vote	%	Status	Leader
1907	0 / 404			N/A	Pablo Iglesias Posse
1910	1 / 404	with CRS	–	Opposition	Pablo Iglesias Posse
1914	1 / 408	with CRS	–	Opposition	Pablo Iglesias Posse
1916	1 / 409	with CRS	–	Opposition	Pablo Iglesias Posse
1918	6 / 409	with AI	–	Opposition	Pablo Iglesias Posse
1919	6 / 409	with CRS	–	Opposition	Pablo Iglesias Posse
1920	4 / 409			Opposition	Pablo Iglesias Posse

== World War I ==
National Association of Spanish Women (ANME) was founded in 1918. Headed by María Espinosa, it lobbied for women's right to vote. The Female Republican Union was created by Campoamor to advocate for women's suffrage in Spain. Campoamor, María Lejárraga and Regina García founded the Foundation for Women to advocate for women's legal equality in Spain during the Second Republic. The movement began to take traction in 1915, when ANME first started to work together to address women's needs. ANME's early feminism was characterized by its right wing leanings, as a result of it being associated with Spain's upper classes.

=== Political activity and labor organization ===
Because women in the pre-Republican period were largely confined to domestic spheres, their political activity tended to be centered around issues related to consumer activities. Women protested and rioted in this period over goods and services shortages, high rents and high prices of consumer goods. Their purpose in going so was to encourage the government to change its practices to address these issues. When political activity occurred by women in the pre-Republican period, it was often spontaneous. They were also often ignored by left-wing male political leaders. Despite this, these riots and protests represented increasing political awareness among women of their need to be more active in social and political spheres to enact change to improve their lives.

Women's protests against high food prices spread across Spain in both 1913 and 1918. In Barcelona, in 1918, women used the slogan: 'In the name of humanity, all women take to the streets!'. They organised repeated demonstrations and attacked shops, warehouses, government offices and music halls. Women also staged food riots during the Spanish Civil War.

Female tobacco workers were the first to unionize, creating their first union in 1918. The union was successful in doubling wages for its workers in 1914 and 1920. The union also successfully had workers wages tripled in 1930. Their labor actions continued into the Second Republic period.

==== Labor and political organizations ====
The 1918 Congress of Confederación Nacional del Trabajo demonstrated the gender based tensions among anarchists in Spain. Men tried to use the Congress to assert their own power over women in both the public and private sphere. This was in large part because male anarchists did not want to see a power dynamic change which would result in a diminishment of their own status.

=== Women's media and writing ===
Margarita Nelken, María Martínez Sierra and Carmen de Burgos were all important pre-Republic writers who influenced feminist thinking inside Spain.

María Martínez Sierra wrote under the name Gregorio Martínez Sierra, publishing a series of four essays using her husband's name during the period from 1916 to 1932. These include Cartas a las mujeres de España, Feminismo, femindidad, españolismo, La mujer moderna, and Nuevas cartas a las mujeres de España. Not until the death of her husband in 1947 did María de la O Lejárraga claim authorship of these writings and admit to intentionally trying to use a masculine voice to try add credibility to them. The feminism she espoused in these letters were a paradox given the impression of male authorship. Her wider body of feminist work also sat outside the feminism being developed by Anglo women in North America and Great Britain, but was well received inside Spain where her plays were performed in Madrileño theaters. One of her major contributions was in changing the medium from which feminist themes were shared, with her primary themes being the problem of subordination of women.

== Post 1919 Spanish general election period ==
Starting in the 1920s, the efforts of women to get the right to vote intensified as part of a broader western movement that saw women demanding equal rights.

=== Political activity and labor organizations ===
==== Communist Party ====
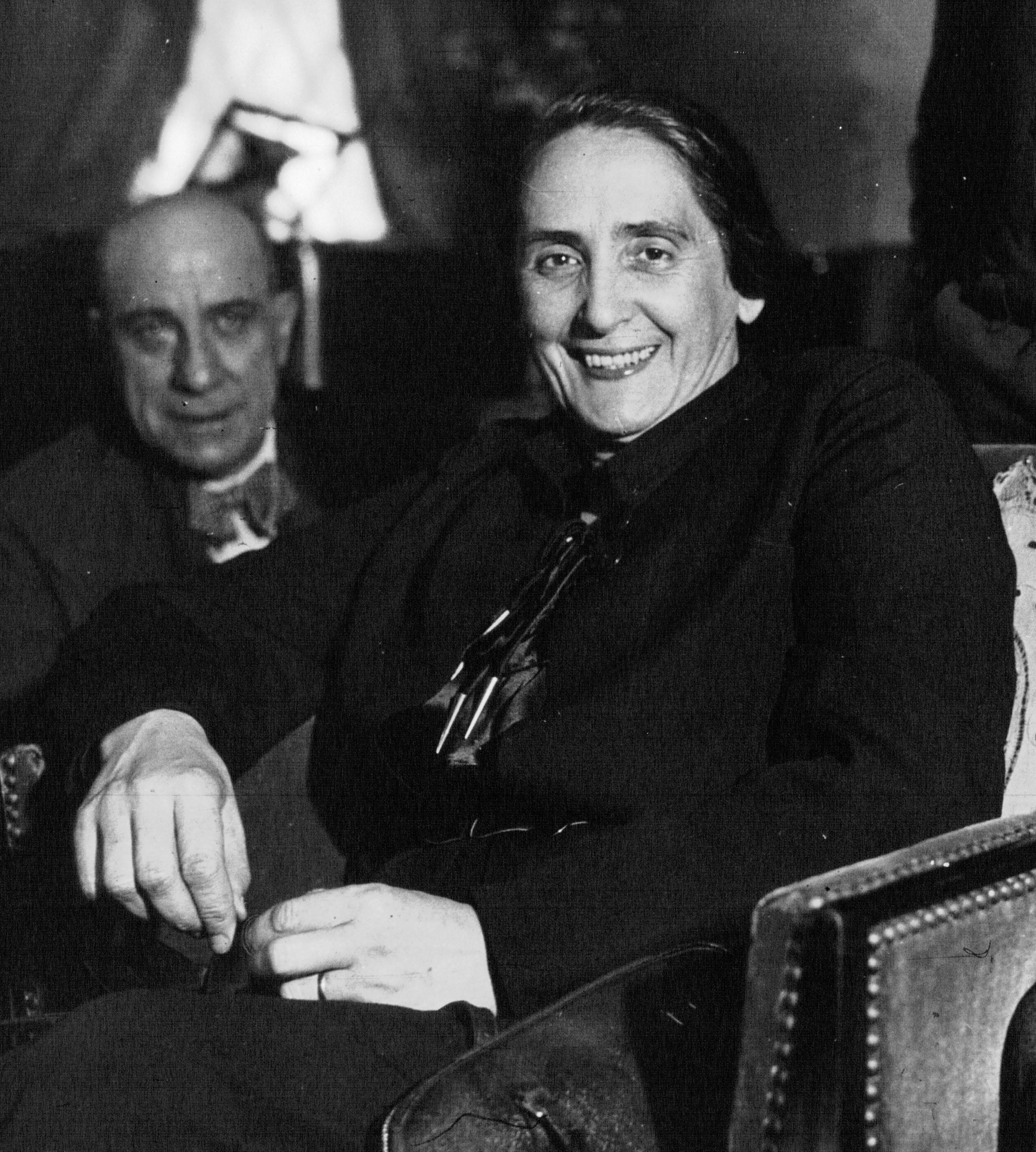
Spanish political leader Dolores Ibárruri in 1936.

Dolores Ibárruri was one of the few women active in leadership in the Communist Party of Spain. Joining during the 1920s, she found herself elected to the Central Committee in 1930. Two years later, she was the head of its Women's Commission.

===== Partido Socialista Obrero Español =====
Prior to the Second Republic, Partido Socialista Obrero Español recognized that women workers lacked a compensatory educational system and access to educational facilities that was equivalent to their male peers. Yet, despite this, they failed to offer any sort of comprehensive policy solution to this problem and were not willing to advocate strongly on the need to address women's education. The extent of their activism for women's education were demands for integral education for men and women. The Feminine Socialist Group of Madrid met in 1926 to discuss women's rights. Attendees included Victoria Kent and Clara Campoamor.

Socialist woman Lidia Falcón argued that the Socialist men's position would push women away from the party, or would result in only including women who believed in subservience to men. Falcón further argued this position would make feminists into enemies of the party, a truth that would be born out by 1921, which Socialist men decided that to stop their small efforts to promote rights of women as they did not believe it was the time to push for electoral reforms.

=== Women's media and writing ===
Carmen de Burgos was not primarily known for her feminist writings in the pre-Republican period. Instead, she was known as a writer of popular novellas. Despite that, her La mujer moderna y sus derechos in 1927 was one of the most important feminist works of its time. As feminist, she started her writing career in the early 1920s as a relative moderate feminist. Having written for various liberal and progressive newspapers from the 1900s to 1920s, it was only as time passed during the latter part of the decade that she became more radical and part of the First Wave Feminism. As a feminist, she advocated reforms to Spain's legal system, including legalizing divorce and women's suffrage. La condición social de la mujer en España was the most notable work of Margarita Nelken in this period. Published in 1919, it was revolutionary in Spanish feminism to the extent that it went beyond describing the problems of women to proscribing solutions, and advocating for changes in women's relationships to groups like working and middle class men, women of different classes, and institutions like the Catholic Church. Writing from a socialist perspective, her feminist works sought to address the conflict between the roles women were expected to maintain in a patriarchal society.

=== Education ===
Institución Libre de Enseñza (ILE) member Fernando de Castro, then dean of the Universidad de Madrid, created the "Sunday Lectures for the Education of Women" in 1868. In 1870, only 9.6% of women were literate, capable of reading and writing. Most of the lectures organized by Castro were around the theme of being a good wife and mother. Following the success of the Sunday lectures, Castro then helped create in 1869 the Ateneo for Women and the School for Female Teachers as a tool for getting women more involved in public life in Spain. Most of the women educated by these programs were ones with affluent, freethinking fathers.

María de Maeztu was an early twentieth century Spanish feminist and pedalogist. She helped co-found the International Institute for Young Ladies in Spain in 1913 as part of larger collaborative efforts. Two years later, she would go on to found the Residence for Young Ladies. She would continue to push for women's education in pre-Republican days. She founded the Lyceum Club in 1926 with cooperation for the International Institute for Young Women. The Club was the first of its kind in Madrid. It would see its ranks include other important Spanish feminists of its day, including Isabel Oyarzabal de Palencia and Victoria Kent. It had over 500 members by 1930, and also included a branch in Barcelona.

The Feminine Youth University Group was created in 1920. It was an affiliate of the International Federation of University Women. The International Federation of University Women held their twelfth international congress in Madrid in 1928.
