= María Salas Larrazábal =

Spanish writer and journalist (1922–2008)

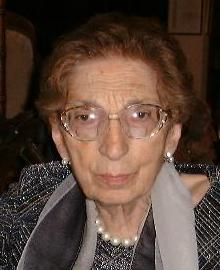
- July 2004
- Born: María Presentación Salas Larrazábal; 22 November 1922; Burgos, Spain
- Died: 15 November 2008 (aged 85); Madrid, Spain
- Other name: Mary Salas
- Occupations: Writer, journalist

María Presentación Salas Larrazábal (22 November 1922 – 15 November 2008), also known as Mary Salas, was a Spanish writer and journalist who specialized in adult education and was a pioneer of women's laity. She was linked to Catholic Action and was the first president of the NGO Manos Unidas. A key figure in the struggle for equality, in 1960, she co-founded the Seminar on Women's Sociological Studies, the precursor of modern gender studies in Spain, and in 1986 promoted the Women's Studies Forum that she chaired.

== Career ==
María Presentación Salas Larrazábal was born in Burgos in 1922. Her father was a general. She studied Philosophy and Literature and received a degree in Semitic philology at a time when few women attended university. She also studied journalism at the Official School.

She was vice-president of Catholic Action's Superior Council of Women, and was responsible for the Adult Education Commission of the World Union of Catholic Women's Organizations (Unión Mundial de Organizaciones Femeninas Católicas; UMOFC), a position that required her to travel around the world, experiencing diverse living conditions that shaped her later writing. She also directed one of the few university dormitories for girls in Madrid.

Throughout her life, she was linked to Catholic Action, of which she was a national leader for more than twenty years, and to the Centers of Popular Culture, which she presided over until 1968.

In 1960, she co-founded the Seminar on Women's Sociological Studies with the support of María Laffitte and the participation of Lilí Álvarez, Elena Catena, and Consuelo de la Gándara. It became a nucleus of moderate and intellectual feminism, and a forerunner of modern gender studies in Spain.

=== Co-founder of Manos Unidas ===
Also in 1960, Salas was one of the founders and first national president of Manos Unidas, and together with Pilar Bellosillo (the sole Spanish woman auditor at the Second Vatican Council), was a fundamental part of the World Union of Catholic Women's Organizations.

She was responsible for initiating the Campaign Against Hunger in Spain, and penned many of the earliest articles which disseminated the ideas contained in the UMOFC's 1955 foundational manifesto.

In 1968, she traveled to Sub-Saharan Africa with Pilar Bellosillo on a mission to promote women's issues. After a meeting in Kinshasa, they traveled to the Ivory Coast, Cameroon, and Senegal to train Catholic leaders of the new era of independence. Earlier, they toured Argentina, Colombia, and Mexico in a one-month course for the training of leaders, paid for by UNESCO.

Among Salas's missions, the one which left the deepest mark on her was the one which led her to India. As she explains in her memoirs,

There was a tremendous famine, I think the last one. In Rome we were charged by Catholic Action to make collections. It was an agonizing situation; many people were dying. We took in 110 million pesetas. We wrote to Indira Gandhi asking what they needed. They told us rice and vehicles to carry the aid that came to the port of Bombay.

In 1977, she was a candidate to the Congress of Deputies for Burgos for the left-wing Democratic Party led by Joaquín Ruiz Giménez.

She wrote assiduously for the journals Ecclesia and Vida Nueva, and was a regular columnist for the new edition of the magazine Signo. She retired from writing in June 2008 due to illness.

== Commitment to women's rights ==
In 1959, Salas published her first work, Nosotras, las solteras, dedicated to women who decided not to marry. Her biographer explains that she wanted to dignify this personal option and keep it away from "the rancid spinsters that appeared in many jokes."

In 1960, she co-founded the Seminar on Women's Sociological Studies, promoted by María Laffitte, a pioneering gender and equality studies group in Spain that served as a bridge between moderate feminism of Christian Democrat circles and that of more uncompromising feminist groups.

Pope Pius XII encouraged her in her commitment to women's rights. Pedro Miguel Lamet recalled words from a tribute to her in Alandar:

In the 1950s, we encouraged Catholic women to occupy all spaces. He wanted to present a Christian feminism, because he saw the force of lay feminism. He said that women had a lot to do to transform a wild world into a human one. I heard it in Rome and saw what this meant for the women of Spain, that we had no right.

In 1986, together with Pilar Bellosillo, Dolores Aleixandre, and Marifé Ramos, Salas promoted the creation of the Women's Studies Forum (Foro de Estudios sobre la Mujer; FEM), a space for Christian women to explore new ecumenical horizons with European networks.

== Awards and recognition ==
- 1996 award of the magazine Alandar, for her tireless work on behalf of women's rights
- In 2001 her name was included in the exhibition "100 women of the 20th century who opened the way in the 21st century" organized by the Women's Council of the Community of Madrid
- 2004 Bravo! award from the Episcopal Conference of Spain "for her long personal and informative career, both in publishing and journalism, in pursuit of promoting the dignity and mission of women in society and in the Church. This was accomplished with a great sense of Christian and ecclesiastical commitment."

== Publications ==
- Nosotras, las solteras (1959). Juan Flors, Editor. Remanso Collection.
- De la promoción de la mujer a la teología feminista: cuarenta años de historia (1993)
