= Elena Catena =

Spanish academic (1920–2012)

- Born: Elena Catena López; 12 November 1920; Salamanca, Spain
- Died: 19 January 2012 (aged 91)
- Education: Complutense University of Madrid
- Occupation: Academic

Elena Catena López (12 November 1920 – 19 January 2012) was a Spanish university professor, philologist, publisher, and feminist. She was one of the first women to obtain a doctorate in Philosophy and Literature at the Complutense University of Madrid, and the first to reach the position of vice dean of that same faculty. In 1960 she co-founded the Seminar on Women's Sociological Studies.

== Career ==
Elena Catena López was born in Salamanca and moved to Madrid after the Spanish Civil War.

In the academic vacuum caused by the Civil War, and the dependent social position that women were placed in by the dictatorship that followed, Elena Catena was one of the first women to obtain a doctorate in Philosophy and Literature at the Complutense University of Madrid, and the first to reach the position of vice dean of the same. She was a professor of Spanish literature and a professor emeritus after her retirement. Her work as a teacher was accompanied by work as an editor, having been responsible for the Castalia Publishing House's Clásicos Castalia collection after the death of Antonio Rodríguez-Moñino, as well as the Biblioteca de Escritoras (Library of Writers) for the same editorial collection, dedicated to rescuing the best works of Spanish authors.

In 2001, Castalia published Homenaje a Elena Catena (Tribute to Elena Catena), a showcase of the author's work and its multiple facets, as well as her latest studies of Spanish literature and those who formed its committee of honor, such as Fernando Lázaro Carreter, Alonso Zamora Vicente, and Carlos Bousoño. Her commitment to teaching was reflected in the depth of her university work, where she was an example to her students.

In the 1960s, Catena was a co-founder of the Seminar on Women's Sociological Studies, along with María Laffitte, María Salas Larrazábal, Lilí Álvarez, Concha Borreguero, and Consuelo de la Gándara. This was a nucleus of moderate and intellectual feminism that promoted the first gender studies in Spain and that, from the viewpoint of Christian democracy, established bridges with other, more left-wing feminist groups. It was not alien or passive, therefore, to the political situation, and existed through the end of the dictatorship and the process of transition.

== Selected works ==
Elena Catena was the author of numerous journal articles. She contributed to various collective publications and directed numerous theses. The most complete review of her publications is compiled by Pilar Martínez in Homenaje a Elena Catena.

- Hernando de Acuña, Varias poesías (as editor, 1954)
- Habla y vida de España (together with Luisa Yravedra, 1958)
- Teatro español del siglo XVIII (as editor, 1969)
- Iniciación a la historia de la Literatura española (1978)
- Azorín, Doña Inés (as editor, 1973)
