= Sociedad Autónoma de Mujeres de Barcelona =

1890s feminist organization in Catalonia

- Founded: 1891
- Dissolved: 1898

Sociedad Autónoma de Mujeres de Barcelona ("Autonomous Society of Women of Barcelona") was a feminist organization in Barcelona active in the 1890s. The group advocated for women's self-emancipation, labor interests, and rights to participate in political and social life. Its headquarters, located in El Raval, held literacy and other educational classes, political debates, and recreational events.

Though there are some indications of group activity as early as 1889, the group was founded by Teresa Claramunt, Ángeles López de Ayala and Amalia Domingo Soler in 1891 with two major demonstrations. The first assembled 4,000 women in Círculo Ecuestre on April 12. The second gathered 3,000 workers at Teatre Circ Barcelonès on April 26.

The Sociedad Progresiva Femenina replaced the Sociedad Autónoma in 1898.
