= Matilde Cantos =

Spanish feminist

Matilde Cantos (1898–1987) was a Spanish feminist and considered one of "the most important Granada politician in the Second Republic". She was born in the Province of Granada, Spain on the 20th of September in 1898.

At a young age Matilde studied psychology in Grenada. She specialized in criminology and graduated in Criminal Sciences in Madrid(add dates). During these studies she passed an exam to become a prison officer and was part of the first promostion of "The Female Auxiliary Section of the Prison Corps" created by Victoria Kent. At the same time she participated in activities organized by the UGT and PSOE. Due to her political activities The President of the Republic, Manuel Azaña appointed her as a delegate for his election in May 1936. During the Civil War, Matilde took an active role fighting fascism alongside Miguel Hernández and Rafael Alberti. She spent time on the front lines encouraging the troops of the 5th Regiment. In 1937 she headed the PSOE delegation at the World Congress of Women against war and fascism held in Paris to request help for the war from the Socialist International and the International Trade Union Federation. In 1939 during the Civil War she exiled in France, then Casablanca and in 1941 she left for Mexico where she lived until 1968. While in Mexico she worked as a social worker for the Ministry of the Interior, dedicating herself to marginalized groups and the indigenous population. She also worked as a journalist writing about Social and Women's issues for various magazines and tabloids. Matilde played an active role in aiding the Spanish Exiles in Mexico.She was a founding member of the Andalusian Center in Mexico City and the Mariana Pineda Club.

Matilde married at a young age to (find out), although the love didn't last and they were divorced on (add).
