= María Laffitte =

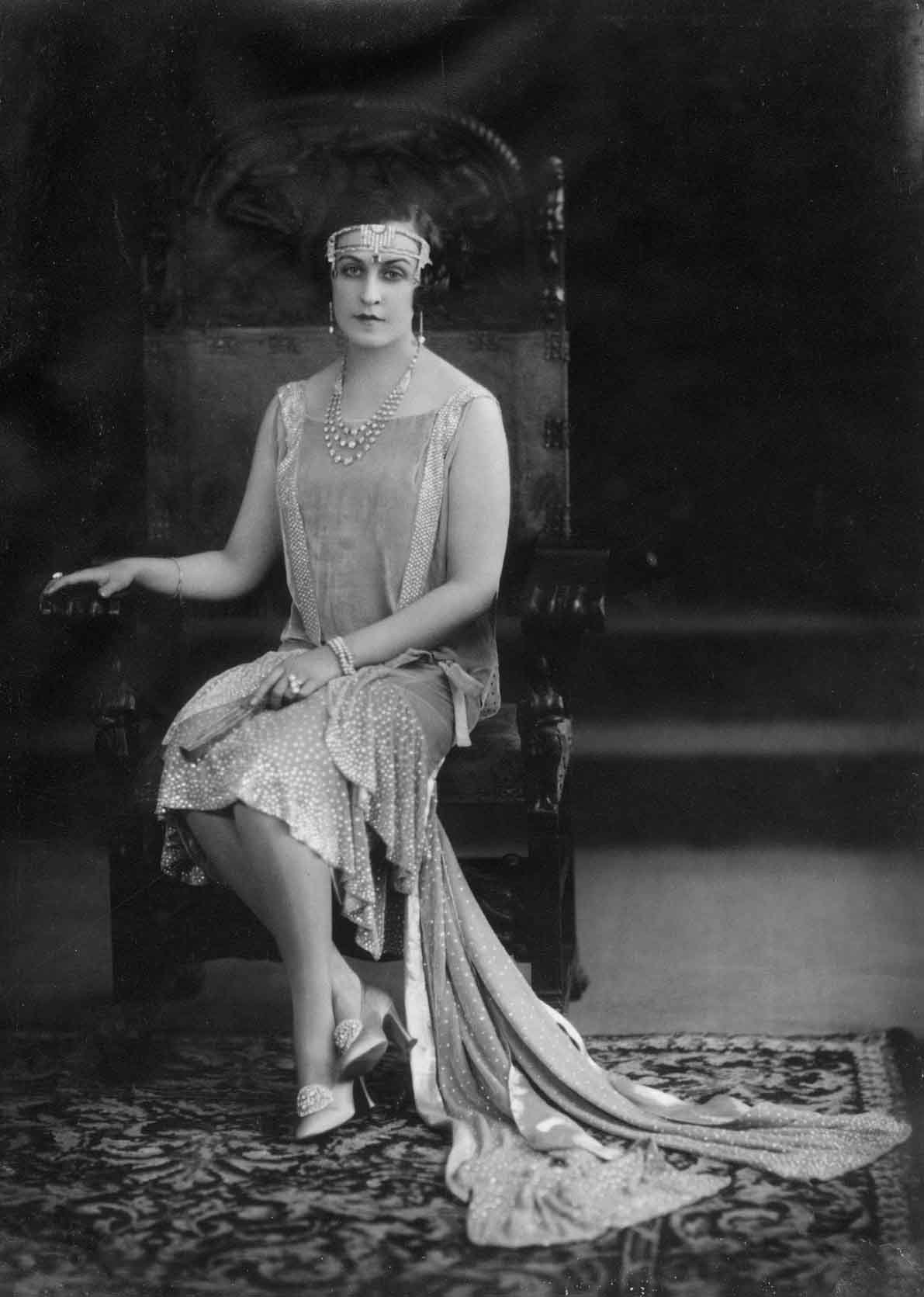
- Born: María Laffitte y Pérez del Pulgar; 15 August 1902; Seville, Spain
- Died: 9 July 1986 (aged 83); Madrid, Spain
- Other names: María Campo Alange
- Occupation: Writer
- Spouse: José de Salamanca

María Laffitte y Pérez del Pulgar, Countess of Campo Alange (15 August 1902 – 9 July 1986) was a Spanish aristocrat, writer, art critic, women's rights activist, and founder of the Seminar on Women's Sociological Studies.

== Biography ==
María Laffitte y Pérez del Pulgar was born in Seville, where she spent her childhood. At age 20 she married and moved to Madrid. Though born to a family of privileged economic status, she nevertheless did not have academic training, something which marked her throughout her life. By age 24, she had three children. "During the best years of my life," she would later write, "I walked disoriented without knowing where to find my path."

"I began to write almost without realizing it, like the dictation of an internal and authoritarian voice," she explained about her process, and a short time later she had in her hands her first work, La biografía crítica de María Blanchard (The Critical Biography of María Blanchard). Unable to obtain a publisher, after offering it to several, she decided to edit the book on her own, and published it in 1944. Years later she also wrote a biography of Concepción Arenal.

Little by little her name became known in the press and certain intellectual circles.

María Laffitte y Pérez del Pulgar signed her books as María Campo Alange, or Countess of Campo Alange, a title she held from her marriage to José de Salamanca, Count of Campo Alange.

She was an active member of the Academia Breve de Crítica de Arte, vice president of the Ateneo de Madrid, and a member of the Real Academia Sevillana de Buenas Letras.

She founded, directed, and sponsored the Seminar on Women's Sociological Studies (Seminario de Estudios Sociológicos de la Mujer; SESM) which, from 1960 until her death in 1986, gathered a group of professionals, university professors, and researchers, such as María Salas Larrazábal, Lilí Álvarez, and Elena Catena, dedicated to investigating the situation of women in Spain.

She collaborated closely with the most important intellectuals of the Spanish post-war period, such as Eugenio d'Ors, José Ortega y Gasset, and Gregorio Marañón, though she also had to confront their patriarchal tendencies.

== Women's rights ==
María Laffitte studied and theorized about the situation of women and their subordination, and sought answers in history, anthropology, art, and science. In 1948, a year before Simone de Beauvoir wrote The Second Sex, Laffitte published La secreta guerra de los sexos (The Secret War of the Sexes) in Spain. Her criticism of the role of science in the essentials of women preceded de Beauvoir's. Her essays and research on women and the social construction of femininity are historic and continue to pose challenging questions.

In her honor, the Maria Laffitte Women's Federation was founded in 2008, based in her hometown of Seville.

== Published books ==
=== Art criticism ===
- 1944 María Blanchard: Madrid, Hauser y Menet.
- 1953 De Altamira a Hollywood, metamorfosis del arte: Madrid, Revista de Occidente. A work which, among other aspects, relates the influence of science on various manifestations of culture such as painting and art. For example, the influence of Darwin on Zola and the cellular vision in the work of Miró.
- 1958 La poética ingenuidad de Pepi Sánchez: Madrid, Ateneo de Madrid.
- 1967 Aquella y esta Sevilla (lecture)

=== Essays and research on women ===
- 1948 La secreta guerra de los sexos: Madrid, Revista de Occidente.
  - 2nd edition: Madrid, Revista de Occidente, 1950.
  - 3rd edition: Madrid, Revista de Occidente, 1958.
  - 4th edition: Madrid, Horas y Horas, 2009.
- 1961 La mujer como mito y como ser humano: Madrid, Taurus.
- 1964 La mujer en España. Cien años de su historia: Madrid, Aguilar.
- 1968 Los Derechos Humanos. Madrid: Ciencia Nueva, [1968 5th edition]. Book written together with José Luis López Aranguren, Ramón Tamames, and Faustino Cordón.
- 1969 En Torno a Teilhard (printed text/presentation), Countess of Campo Alange. Ponentes, P. Dubarle (and others). Grupo Español De Trabajo Teilhard De Chardin. Madrid: Taurus, 1969.
- 1977 Memorias of the Countess of Espoz y Mina (prologue). Madrid: Tebas.
- 1986 La mujer española: de la tradición a la modernidad (1960–1980) (prologue). Madrid: Tecnos.

=== Narrative ===
- 1959 La flecha y la esponja: Madrid, Arión.

=== Biography and autobiography ===
- 1956 Mi niñez y su mundo: Madrid, Revista de Occidente.
  - 2nd edition: Madrid, Castalia, 1990.
- 1973 Concepción Arenal (1820–1893). Estudio biográfico documental: Madrid, Revista de Occidente.
- 1983 Mi atardecer entre dos mundos. Recuerdos y cavilaciones: Barcelona, Planeta.

=== Works in collaboration ===
- 1967 Habla la mujer. Un sondeo entre la juventud actual. Madrid: Cuadernos para el Diálogo.
- 1970 Mujer y aceleración histórica. Madrid: Cuadernos para el Diálogo.
- 1977 Diagnosis sobre el amor y el sexo. Barcelona: Plaza y Janés.
