= Ángeles López de Ayala =

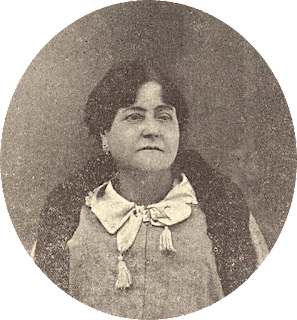

Ángeles López de Ayala y Molero (21 September 1858 – 29 January 1926) was a Spanish playwright, narrator, journalist, and political activist, considered the leading feminist intellectual in that country in the late 19th century and early 20th century.

== Biography ==
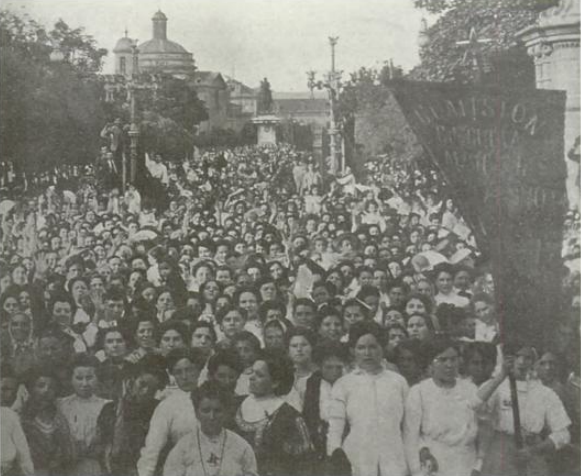
March of women of Barcelona, summoned by Ángeles López de Ayala, 10 July 1910, in favor of secular education.

Ángeles López de Ayala y Molero was born in Seville, 21 September 1858. Her views were based on Spanish Republicanism, feminism and Freemasonry ideologies. Along with the anarchist Teresa Claramunt and the spiritist Amalia Domingo Soler, she co-founded the Sociedad Autónoma de Mujeres de Barcelona (1892), which was considered the first feminist organization in Spain; and the Sociedad Progresiva Femenina in 1898. A strong defender of women's rights, she affirmed that women need to emancipate themselves from the church and from male supremacy. She died Barcelona, 29 January 1926.

== Selected works ==
- Lo que conviene a un marido, 1880.
- Don Gonzalo de Córdoba, 1880.
- El triunfo de la virtud, 1881.
- Los terremotos de Andalucía o Justicia de Dios. Madrid: Tip. Huérfanos, 1886
- Cuentos y cantares para los niños. Madrid: José Matarredona, 1888.
- De tal siembra tal cosecha. Barcelona: Maucci, 1889.
- Absurdos sociales, Barcelona, 1899.
- Primitivo, 1900.
