= Teresa Claramunt =

Catalan anarcho-syndicalist

Teresa Claramunt i Creus
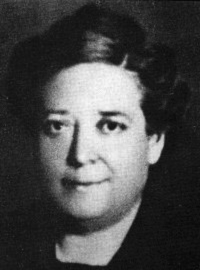
- Teresa Claramunt i Creus (1910)
- Born: 4 June 1862; Sabadell, Catalonia, Spain
- Died: 11 April 1931 (aged 68); Barcelona, Catalonia, Spain
- Resting place: Montjuïc Cemetery
- Organizations: Sociedad Autónoma de Mujeres de Barcelona; Confederación Nacional del Trabajo
- Movement: Anarcho-syndicalism; Anarcha-feminism

Teresa Claramunt i Creus (1862–1931) was a Catalan anarcho-syndicalist. Claramunt lived in a time marked by a labour movement in formation and by rising anarchist sentiments. A pioneer of anarcha-feminism, she was one of the first to propose the formation of an autonomous organization of anarchist women, a legacy that a few years after her death would be picked up by the Mujeres Libres organization.

== Biography ==
Teresa Claramunt i Creus was born in 1862 into a working-class family in Sabadell. She was a textile worker and founded an anarchist group in Sabadell. She was influenced by Fernando Tarrida del Mármol, with whom she participated in the seven-week strike of 1883, during which the 10-hour day was demanded. In October 1884, she was one of the founders of the Various Section of Anarcho-Collectivist Workers at the Sabadell Workers' Academy. For Claramunt, organisation and education were indispensable conditions for workers' emancipation.

With the freethinker Ángeles López de Ayala and the spiritualist Amalia Domingo Soler, in 1892, Claramunt established the first feminist society in Spain, the Autonomous Society of Women of Barcelona (Spanish: Sociedad Autónoma de Mujeres de Barcelona), an organization articulated around anarchist and republican freethinking. This entity was first located on Carrer de la Cadena in Barcelona, now Rambla del Raval, and later moved to Carrer de Fernandina, 20, in the same neighbourhood. During those years, Teresa Claramunt lived at Carrer de l'Aurora, 19, very close to the organization's headquarters.

In 1893, a meeting of liberal students was held in the Calvo-Vico Theatre, to which Claramunt had gone with her husband Antonio Gurri, Josep Llunas and other anarchists. But Claramunt herself was prevented from entering the theatre, since there was a ban from the governor preventing access to women. Claramunt learned that women had entered and she felt doubly discriminated against, which made her protest. According to La Tramontana, 3,000 people attended the event and at the end there were clashes between the attendees and the Civil Guard. Due to this incident, Teresa Claramunt and Antonio Gurri were arrested and imprisoned in Montjuïc Castle; later they were subjected to a military tribunal, along with other anarchist prisoners.

Following the 1896 Barcelona Corpus Christi procession bombing, Claramunt was arrested and brutally beaten, which would have lasting consequences for the rest of her life. Although she was not convicted of any crime, after the trial, she was exiled to the United Kingdom until 1898. After she returned, in 1901, she founded the magazine El Productor and actively participated in the social movements of the early 20th century. In 1902, she took part in the meetings in solidarity with the metal strikers and in the general strike of February 1902. She collaborated in La Tramontana and La Revista Blanca and directed the newspaper El Rebelde between 1907 and 1908.

She was arrested again after the Tragic Week in August 1909 and imprisoned in Zaragoza, where in 1911 she promoted the adhesion of local unions to the National Confederation of Labor (Spanish: Confederación Nacional del Trabajo, CNT). She also participated in the general strike of 1911, which resulted in her receiving another prison sentence. Already very ill and confined between her bed and a chair, the police searched her apartment after the attack on Cardinal Juan Soldevila y Romero in Zaragoza on 4 June 1923, looking for evidence that would implicate her. In 1924, she returned to Barcelona, but the progression of her paralysis kept her away from public activity. She spent the last years of her life at her sister's house, where she was visited by Emma Goldman. On the day of 1931 Spanish local elections, which would lead to the proclamation of the Second Spanish Republic, she was buried in the Montjuïc Cemetery. In his eulogy to Claramunt, Francisco Madrid declared:

Teresa Claramunt's name wandered on people's lips with the same devotion that the name of Louise Michel was pronounced in Paris, and that of Rosa Luxemburg was pronounced in Germany.

She has a street and a school named after her in her home town of Sabadell.

== See also ==
- Anarchism in Spain
