= Carmen de Burgos =

Spanish journalist, writer, translator and women's rights activist

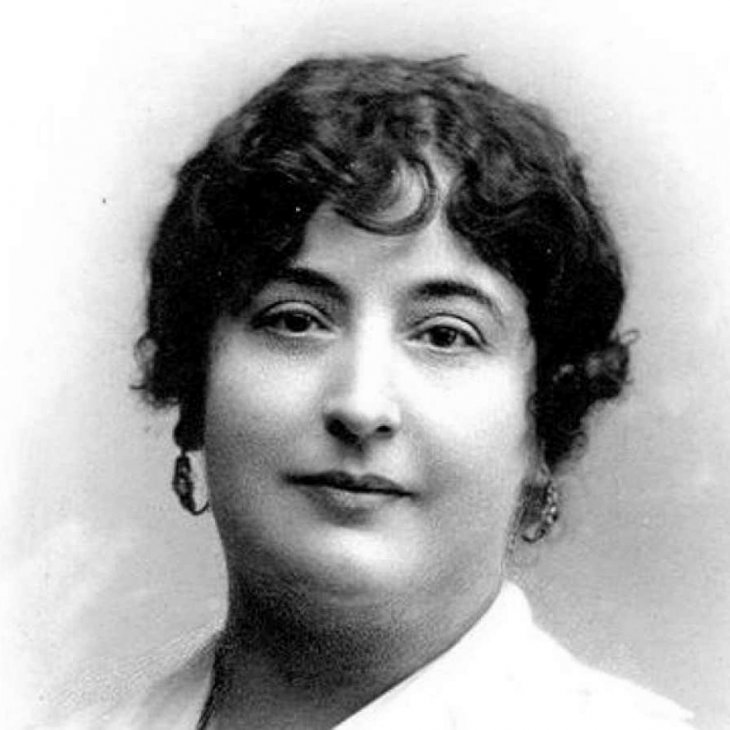
Carmen de Burgos

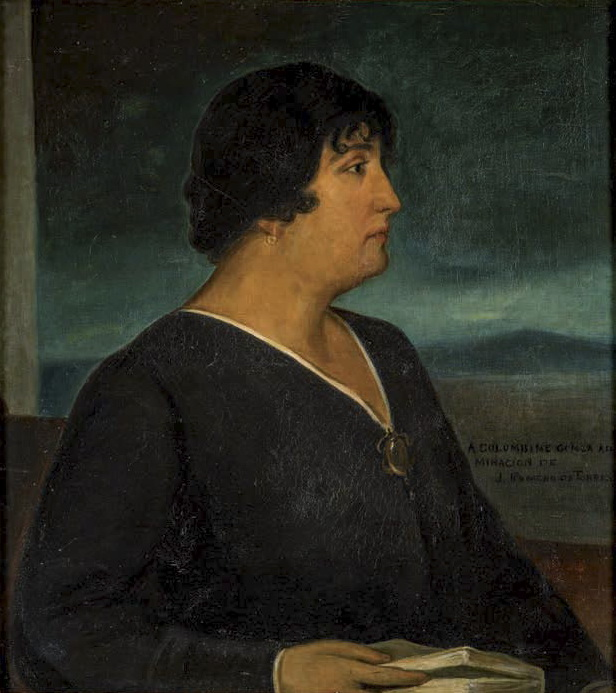
Portrait by Julio Romero de Torres in 1917

Carmen de Burgos y Seguí (pseudonyms, Colombine, Gabriel Luna, Perico el de los Palotes, Raquel, Honorine and Marianela; Almería, December 10, 1867 – Madrid, October 9, 1932) was a Spanish journalist, writer, translator and women's rights activist. Johnson describes her as a "modern" if not "modernist" writer.

== Early years ==
She was born in 1867 in Almeria to a middle-class family, in which her father owned a gold mine. Her father José de Burgos Cañizares and her uncle Ferdinand were in charge of the vice-consulate of Portugal in Almeria. Her mother, Nicosia Segui Nieto, had come to the marriage with a substantial inheritance.

== Career ==
She escaped her family when she met Arturo Asterz Bustos. He was fifteen years older than her; he was a poet, writer, and an alcoholic. Her new husband earned money as a typesetter on the family's newspaper, but she quickly discovered that this was to be her work. She and Arturo were unhappily married for 17 years, having four children - of whom only one survived. In 1898 her infant son died and she enrolled at the local college to obtain a teaching certificate. She quickly advanced, and within a year she was qualified to teach primary. By the end of 1898, she was qualified to teach secondary school and by 1900 she was qualified to teach teachers. Armed with her new achievements, she could anticipate employment for life. She and her remaining daughter left her abusive and unfaithful husband and they set up their own house in Guadalajara where her first book was written. During this time she had learnt how to write for a living, she had earned her independence and she had developed a contempt for the institution of marriage. Burgos regarded herself as a feminist but her gender meant that her writings were not included when evaluations were made of Spanish (male) modernism.

However Burgos was nominally creating a number of novels for the "weekly novel" market that was popular at the start of the twentieth century. Burgos's novels however dealt with legal and political themes. Her novels dealt with taboo subjects including male and female homosexuality. She highlighted the dual values applied that blamed women who were adulterers whereas men's involvement was forgiven. Women were given responsibility for illegitimate children and the law overlooked the abuse that some women found within their marriages. It has been noted that Burgos raised controversial subjects concerning gender, the law and rights but her writing did not offer a solution. She exposed to the readers the disparity between traditional values of female education and modern life. Burgos however exposed difficult issues as a dramatic event and in 1904 she had led a campaign to improve the availability of divorce.

== Recognition ==
In 1906, Burgos became the first female professional journalist in Spain as editor of Madrid's Diario Universal. She also served as the first president of the International League of Iberian and Latin American Women (Liga Internacional de Mujeres Ibéricas e Hispanoamericanas). During Franco's dictatorship, Burgos was written out of the history books. Following the restoration of democracy she was again recognised and reinstated into the history of women's rights in Spain.

== Selected works ==
=== Essays and other works ===
- Ensayos literarios, 1900.
- Álbum artístico literario del siglo XX, 1901.
- Notas del alma, 1901, (colección de coplas populares)
- El divorcio en España, 1904.
- La mujer en España, 1906.
- Por Europa, 1906
- La voz de los muertos, 1911
- Leopardi, 1911
- Misión social de la mujer, 1911
- Cartas sin destinatario, 1912
- Al balcón, 1913
- Impresiones de Argentina, 1914
- Confidencias de artistas, 1916
- Peregrinaciones, 1917
- Mis viajes por Europa, 1917
- ¿Quiere usted comer bien?, 1917
- Fígaro, 1919
- La Emperatriz Eugenia, 1920
- Hablando con los descendientes, 1929
- Gloriosa vida y desdichada muerte de D. Rafael del Riego, 1931.
- Amadís de Gaula, s.a.

=== Novels ===
- Los inadaptados, 1909
- La rampa, 1917
- El último contrabandista, 1918
- Los anticuarios, 1919
- El retorno, 1922
- La malcasada, 1923.
- Los espirituados, 1923.
- La mujer fantástica, 1924.
- El tío de todos, 1925.
- Quiero vivir mi vida, 1931.
- Los anticuarios.

=== Short stories ===
- Ensayos literarios, 1900.
- Alucinación, 1905
- El anhelo
- El abogado
- El artículo 438
- Cuentos: El tesoro del castillo
- Cuentos de Colombine
- En la guerra
- Honor de familia

=== Translations ===
- Historia de mi vida (muda, sorda y ciega), 1904
- La guerra ruso-japonesa, 1904.
- La inferioridad mental de la mujer, 1904.
- Loca por razón de Estado, 1904.
- Los Evangelios y la segunda generación cristiana, 1904
- La Iglesia cristiana, 1905
- Diez y seis años en Siberia, 1906.
- En el mundo de las mujeres, 1906.
- El rey sin corona, 1908.
- La conquista de un Imperio, 1911.
- Los misterios de la india, 1911.
- La corona de olivo silvestre, 1911-1913.
- Fisiología del placer, 1913.
- Las mañanas en Florencia, 1913
- Las piedras de Venecia, 1913.
- Las siete lámparas de la arquitectura, 1913.
- Los pintores modernos. El paisaje, 1913.
- Cuentos a Maxa, 1914.
- El reposo de San Marcos. Historia de Venecia, 1915.
- La Biblia de Amiens, 1916.
- La decisión, 1917.
- Una idea de parisiense por página, 1917.
- La perseverancia, 1919.
- Defnis y Cloe, 1910.
- Los últimos filibusteros, 1913.
- La princesa muda, s.a.
- El tío Geromo (Crainqueville).
- Cuentistas italianos.

=== Translations into English ===
- Take Six: Six Spanish Women Writers, edited and translated by Kathryn Phillips-Miles and Simon Deefholts, Dedalus Books, 2022: Contains a selection of her stories in English translation.
- — (2023). "The Russian Princess". In Reigh, Gabi (ed.). Virginia's Sisters. Translated by Slava Faybysh. ISBN 9781912430789. OCLC 1377211507.
