= Dolores Ibárruri =

Former leader of the Communist Party of Spain (1895–1989)

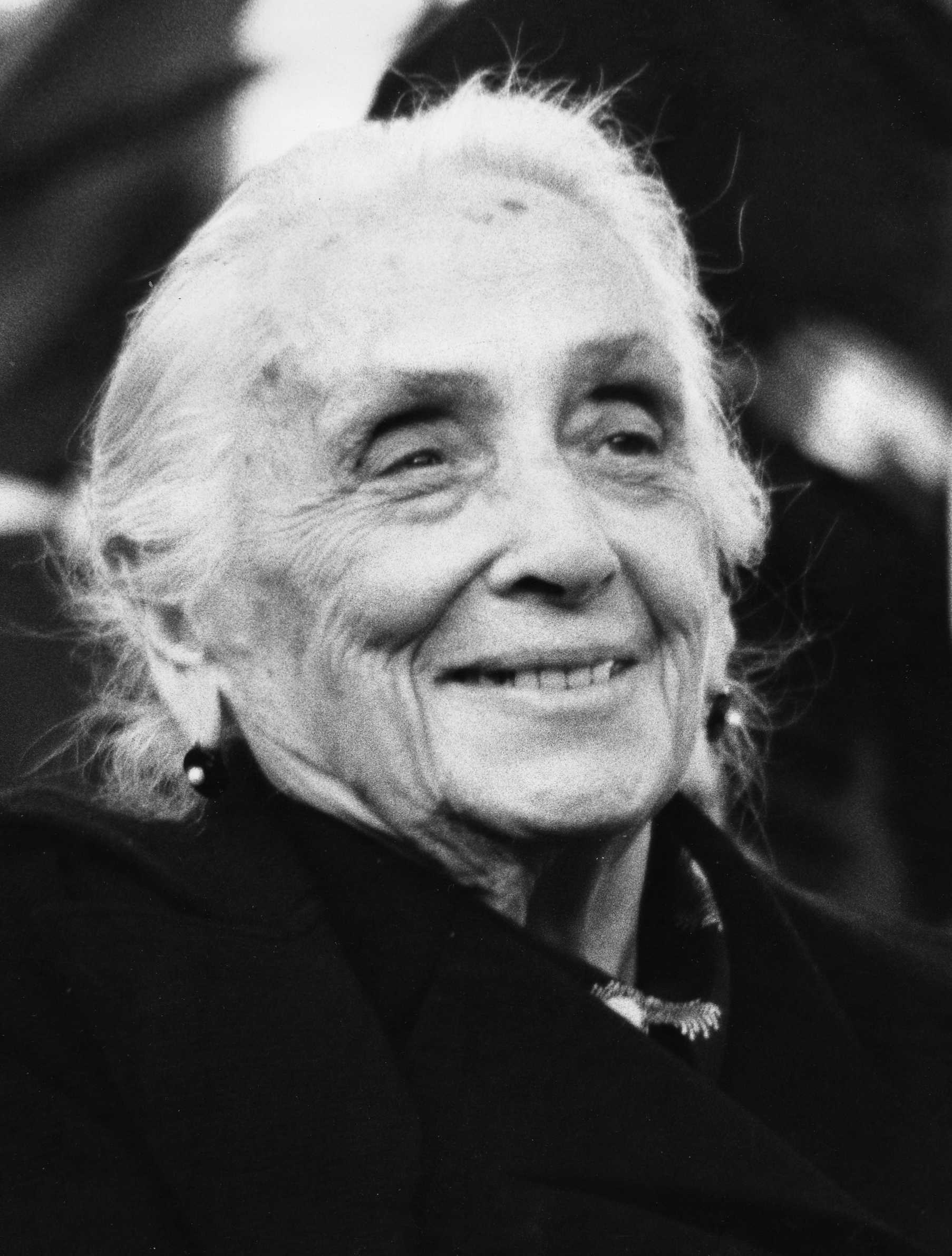
- Dolores Ibárruri in 1978

General Secretary of the Communist Party of Spain
- In office March 1942 – 3 July 1960
- Preceded by: José Díaz
- Succeeded by: Santiago Carrillo

Member of the Cortes Generales
- In office 13 July 1977 – 2 January 1979
- Constituency: Asturias
- In office 26 February 1936 – 2 February 1939
- Constituency: Asturias

Personal details
- Born: Isidora Dolores Ibárruri Gómez; 9 December 1895 Gallarta, Biscay, Spain
- Died: 12 November 1989 (aged 93) Madrid, Spain
- Resting place: Madrid Civil Cemetery
- Party: Communist Party of Spain
- Spouse: Julián Ruiz Gabiña (m. 1916; div. 1933)
- Children: 6

Isidora Dolores Ibárruri Gómez (Spanish: [isiˈðoɾa ðoˈloɾes iˈβaruɾi ˈɣomeθ]; 9 December 1895 – 12 November 1989), also known as Pasionaria ("the passionate one" or Passion flower"), was a Spanish Republican politician during the Spanish Civil War (1936–1939) and a communist. She is renowned for her slogan ¡No Pasarán! ("They shall not pass!"), which she issued during the Battle for Madrid in November 1936.

Ibárruri joined the Spanish Communist Party (Spanish: Partido Comunista Español) when it was founded in 1920. In the 1930s, she became a writer for the Communist Party of Spain (PCE) publication Mundo Obrero, and in February 1936, she was elected to the Cortes Generales as a PCE deputy for Asturias. After going into exile from Spain towards the end of the Civil War in 1939, she became General Secretary of the Central Committee of the Communist Party of Spain, a position she held from 1942 to 1960. The Party then named her honorary president of the PCE, a post she held for the rest of her life. Upon her return to Spain in 1977, she was re-elected as a deputy to the Cortes for the same region she had represented from 1936 to 1939 under the Spanish Second Republic, holding office until 1979. She lived another ten years in retirement until her death in 1989.

== Biography ==
Dolores Ibárruri was born in 1895 as the eighth of eleven children. She had a Basque miner father and a Castilian mother. She grew up in Gallarta but later moved to Somorrostro (Biscay). Gallarta was adjacent to a large siderite mine.

Ibárruri left school at 15 after spending two years preparing for teachers' college at the encouragement of her schoolmistress. Her parents could not afford further education, so she went to work as a seamstress and later as a housemaid. She became a waitress in the town of Arboleda, the most important urban nucleus in the region of Somorrostro. There, she met Julián Ruiz Gabiña, a union activist and founder of the Socialist Youth of Somorrostro. They married in late 1915, two years after the birth of their first child. The young couple participated in the general strike of 1917, which led to the imprisonment of Ruiz. During this time, Ibárruri spent nights reading the works of Karl Marx, Engels and others found in the library of the Socialist Workers' Centre in Somorrostro. Ibárruri wrote her first article in 1918 for the miners' newspaper El Minero Vizcaíno under the pseudonym of "La Pasionaria" ("The Passion Flower"). The article was published during Holy Week and focused on religious hypocrisy, contrasting with the Passion of Christ. Because of the article's theme and timing, she signed it with the alias Pasionaria. In 1920, Ibárruri and the Workers' Centre joined the newly formed Communist Party of Spain (PCE), and she was named a member of the Provincial Committee of the Basque Communist Party. After ten years of grassroots militancy, she was appointed to the Central Committee of the PCE in 1930.

During this time, Ibárruri had six children. Of her five daughters, four died very young. She "used to relate how her husband made a small coffin out of a crate of fruit." Her son, Rubén, died at twenty-two during the Battle of Stalingrad. The remaining child, Amaya Ruiz Ibárruri, outlived her mother. She was married to Stalin's adopted son, Artyom Sergeyev. In 2008, Amaya resided in the working-class neighbourhood of Ciudad Lineal in Madrid. She died in 2018 at the age of 95.

=== In Madrid (1931–1936) ===
With the advent of the Second Republic in 1931, Ibárruri moved to Madrid and became the editor of the PCE newspaper Mundo Obrero. She was arrested for the first time in September 1931. Jailed with common offenders, she persuaded them to begin a hunger strike to secure freedom for political detainees. Following a second arrest in March 1932, she led other inmates in singing "The Internationale" in the visiting room and encouraged them to reject poorly paid menial labor in the prison yard. She wrote two articles from jail: one published by the PCE periodical Frente Rojo and the other by Mundo Obrero. On 17 March 1932, she was elected to the Central Committee of the PCE at the 4th Congress held in Seville.

In 1933, Ibárruri founded Mujereres Antifascistas, a women's organisation opposed to Fascism and war. On 18 April, Soviet astronomer Grigory Neujmin discovered asteroid 1933 HA and named it "Dolores" in her honour. In November, she travelled to Moscow as a delegate of the 13th Plenum of the Executive Committee of the Communist International (ECCI), which assessed the dangers posed by fascism and the threat of war. The sight of the Russian capital thrilled Ibárruri. "To me, who saw it through the eyes of the soul", she wrote in her autobiography, "it was the most wonderful city on earth. The construction of socialism was being managed from it. In it were taking shape the earthly dreams of freedom of generations of slaves, outcasts, serfs, and proletarians. From it one could take in and perceive the march of humanity toward communism." She did not return to Spain until the new year.

In 1934, she attended the First World Meeting of Women against War and Fascism (Rassemblement Mondial des femmes contre la guerre et le fascisme) in Paris. Although the meeting was chaired by Gabrielle Duchêne, president of the French branch of the Women's International League for Peace and Freedom, the separate Rassemblement was an organ of the short-lived French Popular Front. Both the Rassemblement and the Front dissolved in 1939.

Toward the end of 1934, Ibárruri and two others spearheaded a risky rescue mission to the mining region of Asturias to bring more than a hundred starving children to Madrid. The parents of these children had been jailed following the failed October Revolution, which was suppressed by General Franco at the behest of the Republican government. Ibárruri succeeded in her mission but was briefly detained in the prisons of Sama de Langreo and Oviedo. To spare her children further anguish, she sent them to the Soviet Union in the spring of 1935.

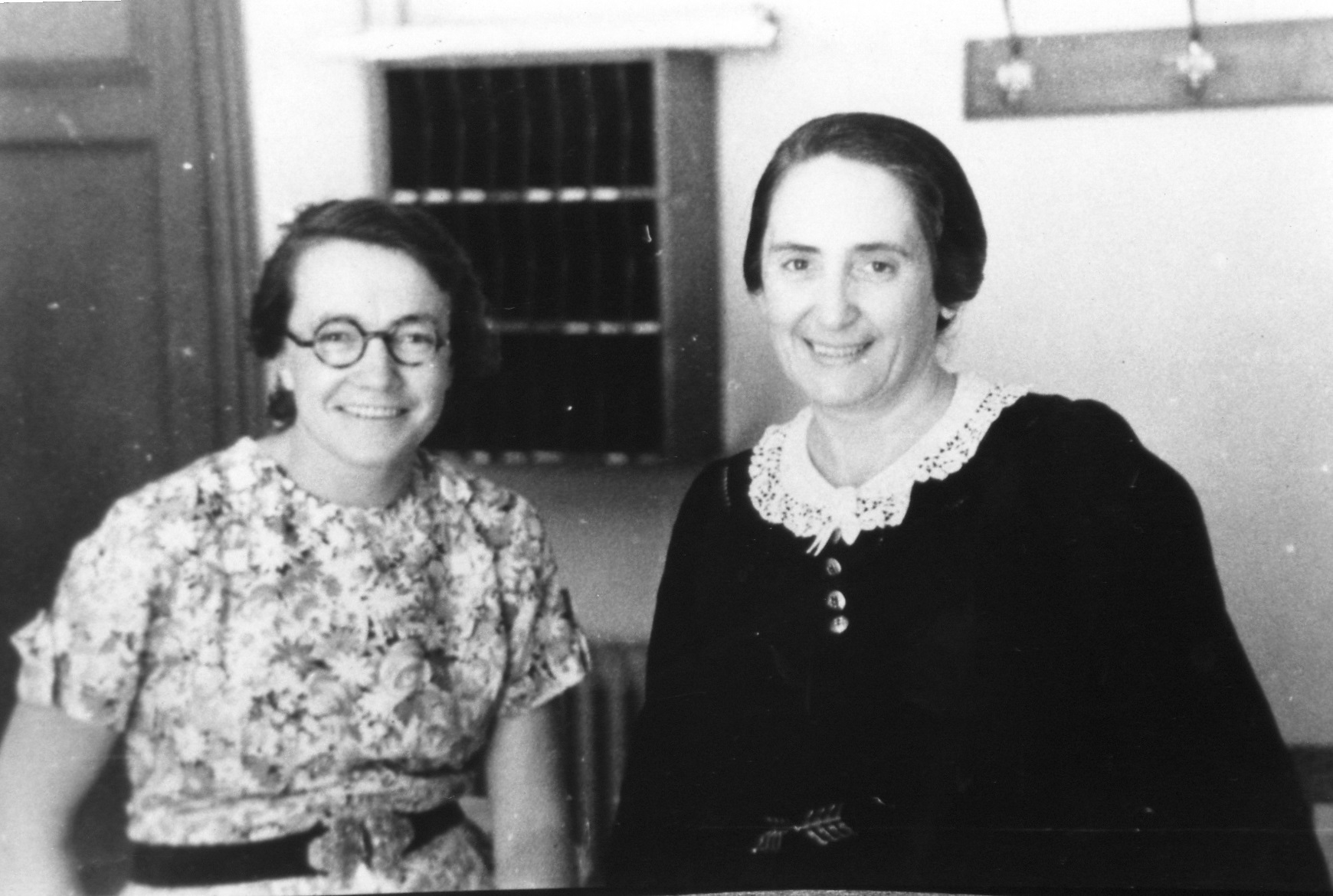
Ibárruri (right) with French activist Bernadette Cattanéo, 1936

In 1935, she secretly crossed the Spanish border to attend the 7th World Congress of the Communist International, held from 25 July to 21 August in Moscow. At this Congress, Georgi Dimitrov delivered a keynote speech proposing an alliance with "progressive bourgeois" governments against the fascists. Under this doctrine, the Popular Front would come to power in France in June 1936. Ibárruri welcomed Dimitrov's speech as a vindication of the PCE's long-standing position and returned home "full of enthusiasm, determined to do the impossible to achieve a consensus among the various workers' and democratic organisations of our country." At the same Congress, she was elected a deputy member of the ECCI and became the second prominent Communist figure in Spain after José Díaz, the secretary-general of the PCE.

In 1936, Ibárruri was jailed for the fourth time after enduring severe abuse from the arresting officers in Madrid. Upon her release, she went to Asturias to campaign for the PCE in the general elections held on 16 February. In these elections, 323,310 ballots were cast. However, "one ballot, one vote" did not apply; each voter could choose up to 13 candidates simultaneously. The PCE received 170,497 votes, enough to secure one seat in Parliament for Dolores Ibárruri. The Popular Front's election platform included the release of political prisoners, and La Pasionaria set out to free the detainees in Oviedo immediately.

As soon as the victory of the Popular Front in the elections became known I, already an elect member of Parliament, showed up at the prison of Oviedo the next morning, went to the office of the Director, who had fled in a mad panic because he had behaved like a genuine criminal toward the Asturian prisoners interned after the revolution of October 1934, and there I found the Administrator to whom I said, "Give me the keys because the prisoners must be released this very day." He replied, "I have not received any orders", and I answered, "I am a member of the Republic's Parliament, and I demand that you hand over the keys immediately to set the prisoners free." He handed them over and I assure you that it was the most thrilling day of my activist life, opening the cells and shouting, "Comrades, everyone get out!" Truly thrilling. I did not wait for Parliament to sit or for the release order to be given. I reasoned, "We have run on the promise of freedom for the prisoners of the revolution of 1934—we won—today the prisoners go free."

In the months before the Spanish Civil War, she joined the strikers at the Cadavio mine in Asturias and stood beside poor tenants evicted from a suburb of Madrid. Around this time, Federico García Lorca, La Pasionaria, and friends were chatting and sharing a coffee in a Madrid café when Lorca, who had been observing Ibárruri's appearance, told her, "Dolores, you are a woman of grief, of sorrows... I'm going to write you a poem." The poet returned to Granada and met his death at the hands of the Nationalists before completing the task.

=== Spanish Civil War (1936–1939) ===
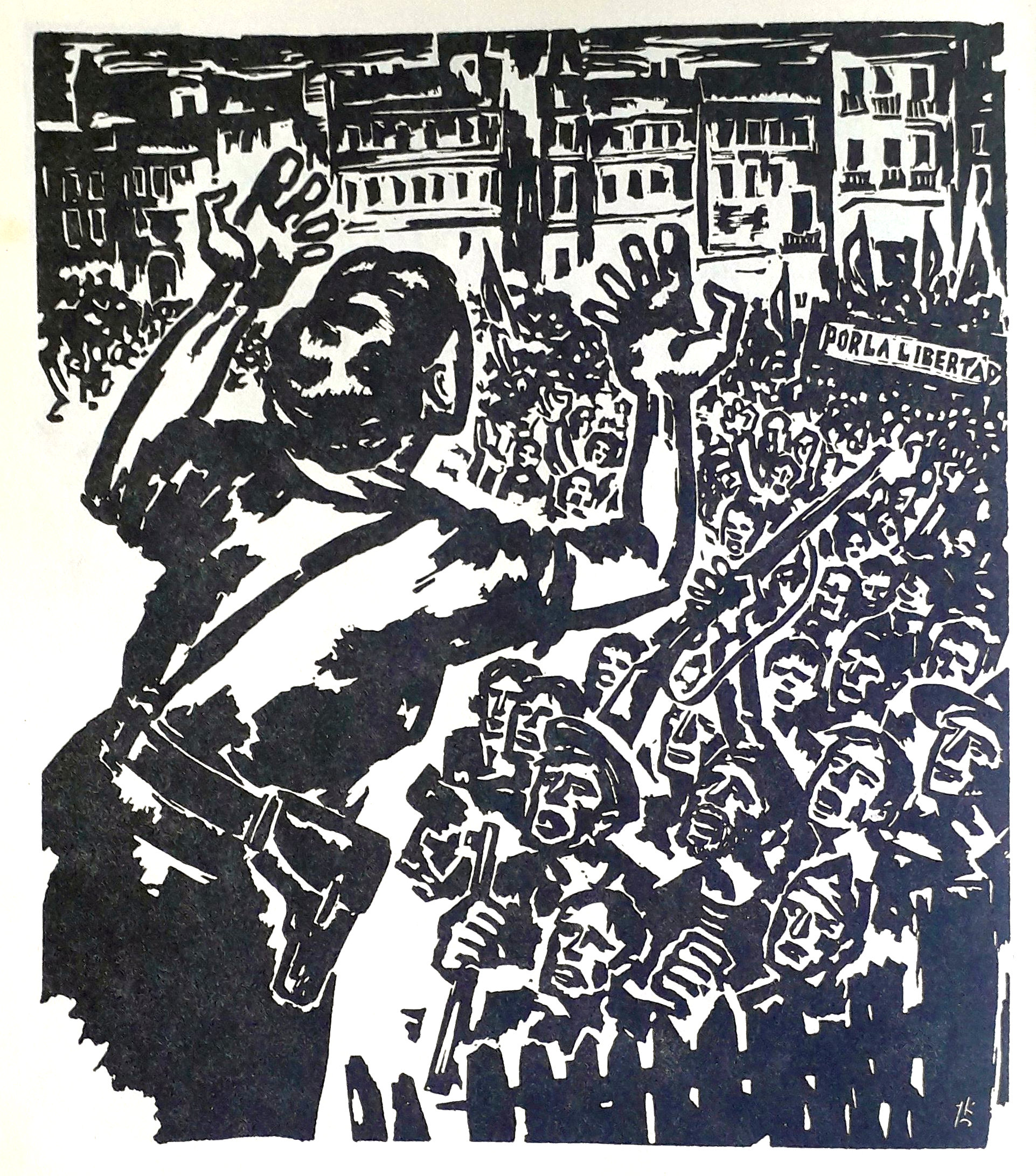
Đorđe Andrejević Kun - Pasionaria speaks to the fighters before going to the front, graphic from Spain.

Ibárruri delivered a series of speeches, some of which were radio broadcasts from Madrid: "Danger! To Arms!" (19 July), "Our Fighters Must Lack for Nothing!" (24 July), "Discipline, Composure, Vigilance!" (29 July), "Restrain the Hand of the Foreign Meddlers!" (30 July), "Fascism Shall Not Pass!" (24 August), "Better to Die Standing Up Than to Live Kneeling Down!" (3 September), "A Salute to Our Militia Women on the Front Line" (4 September), and "Our Battle Cry Has Been Heard by the Whole World" (15 September). It can be inferred that the majority in Madrid rallied to the Republic's side, that uncontrolled elements roamed the capital and many rounds of gunfire were wasted out of nerves (29 July), that Nationalist propaganda was more effective (30 July), and that she recognised early on that the war would be lost without foreign aid (24 August). On 2 October, she wrote a revealing letter to her son in Russia, apologising for not having written earlier and describing the harrowing situation: "You cannot even imagine, my son, how savage is the struggle going on in Spain now... Fighting is going on daily and round the clock. And in this fighting, some of our finest and bravest comrades have perished." She recounted spending many days beside the troops at the front and expressed her concerns about the war's outcome: "It is my hope that in spite of all the difficulties, particularly the lack of weapons, we shall still win." The war became particularly brutal in 1937. Just as the Blitz later drove the Allies to bomb German cities mercilessly, the Nationalist bombardment of open cities spurred Ibárruri (then the newly named fourth vice president of Congress) to demand an equal response from the "progressive bourgeois" government. President Manuel Azaña, an intellectual and writer, was unwilling to flout constitutional or international laws, while Prime Minister Francisco Largo Caballero, a socialist, was reluctant to cooperate with the PCE. The closing lines of her speech signalled her readiness to endorse radical violence.

Men and women of every country who love freedom and progress, we appeal to you for the final time. If our appeal remains a voice crying out in the wilderness, our protests are ignored, our humane conduct, if all these are taken for signs of weakness, then the enemy will have only himself to blame—for we shall give vent to our wrath and destroy him in his lair.

On 24 February, Stalin forbade the sending of Soviet volunteers to fight in Spain, but he did not recall Alexander Orlov, an Order of Lenin awardee from the NKVD (secret police). Orlov and the NKVD orchestrated the May Days, the conflict that erupted between 3 and 8 May in Barcelona between the Popular Front and the Trotskyist Workers' Party of Marxist Unification (POUM). The battle resulted in approximately 1,000 fighters being killed and 1,500 injured, though estimates vary. Following the suppression of the POUM, any possibility of Spain serving as a refuge for Leon Trotsky was eliminated. Orlov employed the same methods of terror, duplicity, and deception used during the Great Purge (1936–1938).

As a result of the events from 3 to 8 May in Barcelona, the Trotskyists and the Anarchists came to be seen by Ibárruri as the "Fascist enemy within."

When we point out the need of opposing Trotskyism we discover a very strange phenomenon, that voices are raised in its defense in the ranks of certain organizations and among certain circles in certain parties. These voices belong to people who themselves are intoxicated with this counter-revolutionary ideology. The Trotskyists have long been transformed into the agents of Fascism, into the agents of the German Gestapo. We saw this on the ground during the May putsch in Catalonia; we saw this clearly in the disturbances that occurred in various other places. And everybody will realize this when the trial opens against the POUM. leaders who were caught spying. And we realize that the hand of Fascism is behind every attempt to demoralise our home front, to undermine the authority of the Republic. Therefore it is essential that we wipe out Trotskyism with a firm hand, for Trotskyism is no longer a political option for the working class but an instrument of the counter-revolution.

Trotskyism must be rooted out of the proletarian ranks of our Party as one roots out poisonous weeds. The Trotskyists must be rooted out and disposed of like wild beasts, for otherwise every time our men wish to go on the offensive we will not be able to do so due to lawlessness caused by the Trotskyists in the rear. An end must be put to these traitors once and for all so that our men on the front lines can fight without fear of being stabbed in the back.

Ibárruri attributed the events to an "anarcho-Trotskyist" attempt to undermine the Republican government on orders from Franco, acting in concert with Adolf Hitler. She claimed the violence was the culmination of an anarchist plot that included plans to halt train movement and cut all telegraph and telephone lines. She cited an "order [from the Catalan government] to its forces to control the telephone building and disarm all people whom they encounter in the streets without proper authorization" as part of the anarchist scheme. She did not cite specific evidence for these claims, which were accepted by many Party members at the time. Later analyses by historians have challenged the validity of these claims.

The Communist Party alleged that the anarchist "putsch" was motivated by resentment of the centralized military command sought by the Communists and their allies in Lluís Companys's Catalan government, as well as a desire to seize political power. The anarchists and Trotskyists viewed the events as an attempt by the Communist Party (in close contact with the Stalinist NKVD) to dominate all revolutionary activity and blamed the Communists for authoritarianism. They contrasted the Communist police state with the egalitarian conditions that existed prior to the May 1937 events.

Ibárruri, Díaz, and the rest of the PCE viewed the Trotskyists as a significant threat and worked to suppress their influence.

During the month of June 1937 the government of the Popular Front, now clearly under Communist sway, eradicates those segments of its own army under the control of the POUM and of the Anarchists, every one stationed in the Front of Aragon. On 29 July the 29th Division of the POUM is disarmed in the Front of Huesca and on August 4 the Anarchist–Sindicalista Council of Aragon is dissolved by decree. In Barcelona the police unleashes the cruellest of persecutions against the POUM. The new police chief since May is Ricardo Burillo Stholle, a professional officer and a Mason, who was the commander of the Assault Guards that killed José Calvo Sotelo and who has now joined the PCE. On cue from Alexander Orlov—liaison of the NKVD (Soviet secret police) with the Ministry of the Interior of the Second Spanish Republic and responsible on the Soviet side for the transfer of the gold of Moscow from Spain to the Soviet Union—Burillo's officers arrest Andrés Nin leader of the POUM. Taken first to Valencia and then to Madrid, Nin will be tortured, skinned, mutilated and finally murdered by Orlov's agents at Alcalá de Henares on June 20, 1937.

The remnants of the POUM leadership were put on trial in Barcelona on 11 October 1938. Referring to the arraignments, Ibárruri said: "If there is an adage that says in normal times it is preferable to acquit a hundred guilty ones rather than punish a single innocent one, when the life of a people is in danger, it is better to convict a hundred innocent ones than to acquit a single guilty one."

On 30 April 1938, Stalin proposed a military alliance to France and Britain, effectively forsaking the Spanish Republic.

=== Exile, part I (1939–1960) ===
On 6 March 1939, she flew out of Spain under enemy naval fire to the major Algerian port city of Oran, then under French sovereignty. Her arrival surprised the authorities, who hurriedly put her aboard a liner bound for Marseille. The ship's captain was a Nationalist sympathiser, but a clandestine Communist cell aboard ensured he did not steer the ship towards Nationalist-held Barcelona. This was the third time Ibárruri had evaded capture by the Nationalists.

Ibárruri was helped in France by the Communists, who sheltered her in Paris under police surveillance (the Communist Party would be outlawed by the government of Édouard Daladier on 26 September). From Paris, she travelled to Moscow and stayed there with Díaz, generals Enrique Líster and Juan Modesto, and others. She was reunited with Amaya and Rubén, who had escaped from a French internment camp at the end of the Spanish Civil War.

The Soviet Union received the refugees warmly. Ibárruri was given an apartment in Díaz's building and was assigned a chauffeur to drive her around Moscow. She was also invited to dine at the Dimitrovs'. She enjoyed attending performances at the Bolshoi Theatre and the Romen Theatre, and was an avid reader. She delighted in witnessing the emancipation of Russian women. She helped other families adapt to their new country and generally felt happy enough to sing on occasion.

Ibárruri worked in the Executive Committee of the Communist International Secretariat at the Communist International Headquarters near the Kremlin. Her work involved the continual evaluation, analysis, and discussion of the progress of Communism outside the Soviet Union. This was complemented by internal discussions within the PCE central committee, which focused on Spain. No serious disagreement existed between the Communist Party of Spain and the Communist Party of the Soviet Union until 1968 over the Warsaw Pact invasion of Czechoslovakia. The PCE supported or excused Stalin's domestic and foreign policies, including the signing of the Molotov–Ribbentrop Pact on 24 August 1939.

In January 1940, La Pasionaria wrote the following praise of Joseph Stalin:

To speak about the triumph of socialism over one-sixth of the earth, to write about the lush development of agriculture in the Soviet Union, a development unequalled by any other country, to admire the astonishing growth of socialist industry and the impetuous gains of the workers, to marvel at the unprecedented accomplishments of the mighty Soviet air force, at the mighty beefing up of the Soviet navy, to describe the glorious exploits of the Red Army liberator of peoples, to study the wonderful framework of the huge socialist state with its multiple nationalities united by unbreakable bonds of fraternal friendship, to observe the progress of science, art and of the culture of all Soviet peoples, the joyous life of their children, women, workers, peasants and intellectuals, the abiding security of everyone and their faith in the future, to know the daily life of socialism and the heroic actions of the Soviet people means to see Stalin, to cite Stalin, to encounter Stalin.

Ibárruri was asked to manage a new short-wave radio station that broadcast news, analysis, and opinion to the citizens of Francoist Spain. The Moscow station was officially named Radio España Independiente, but in Spain, it was nicknamed "La Pirenaica," ("The Pyrenees one") partly due to the mistaken belief that it was located in the Pyrenees and partly because the radio itself used the label occasionally. Radio España Independiente began broadcasting on 22 July 1941, one month after Germany invaded the Soviet Union. Initial broadcasts were made from candle-lit basements under sporadic aerial bombardment. Ibárruri recounted that seniors, women, and children kept watch on the terraces of Moscow every night for incendiary bombs dropped by the Luftwaffe. Civilians would pick up the burning sticks with tongs and dunk them in buckets of water.

Many Spanish refugees volunteered to fight alongside the Russians despite Stalin's initial disapproval. According to Ibárruri, more than 200 died in battle. On 18 July 1941, she greeted the Spanish 4th Special Unit assigned to the defence of the Kremlin. Elsewhere, from Crimea to Finland, the Spanish Communist volunteers fought as guerrillas behind enemy lines, in the Red Army, or with the Soviet air force; some made it to Berlin, and at least one scouted territory held by the Spanish Nationalist Blue Division.

On 13 October 1941, martial law was declared in Moscow as the German 3rd Panzer Army came within 140 kilometres (87 miles) of the capital. On 16 October, the ECCI was evacuated by train from Moscow to Ufa, the capital of Republic of Bashkortostan. Díaz, who was gravely ill, went south to Tbilisi, the capital of the Georgian Soviet socialist Republic.

Radio España Independiente now broadcast from Ufa. She used various aliases, such as Antonio de Guevara or Juan de Guernica, presumably to create the impression that the station had an extensive network of commentators and journalists.

On 19 March 1942, Díaz committed suicide. La Pasionaria became secretary-general of the PCE after a brief period of consultations with Stalin.

On 3 September Ibárruri's son Rubén Ruiz Ibárruri lost his life fighting heroically at Stalingrad. Asteroid 2423 Ibarruri is named in his honour.

On 1 March 1943, Stalin established the Union of Polish Patriots, and on 15 May, the ECCI annulled the Third International and granted theoretical independence to each national Communist party. Ibárruri agreed with the decision.

On 23 February 1945, La Pasionaria left Moscow for a trip to Tehran, Baghdad and Cairo. In Cairo, she and her party booked passage on the first passenger ship departing from Alexandria, believing it was bound for Marseille. In fact, the ship, part of a British convoy, headed to Boulogne-sur-Mer near the Belgian border. The voyage lasted three months, and she arrived in Paris too late to meet with Juan Negrín, the last president of the Spanish Republic, to work out a common political strategy against Franco.

From 5 to 8 December, the PCE held a central committee plenum in Toulouse where Santiago Carrillo, the former leader of the Unified Socialist Youth in pre-war Spain who had arrived in liberated France in November 1944, "gained control of the PCE," according to fellow Communist Enrique Líster.

In his book Así destruyó Carrillo el PCE, Líster criticised Ibárruri's conduct between 1939 and 1945, writing:

[An examination of the situation of the PCE between 1939–1945] Would have shown that the political and moral conduct and behaviour of the immense majority of the members of our party, whether in Europe, America, Africa and above all in Spain, had been commendable whereas the conduct and behaviour of a portion of the leaders in exile had left a lot to be desired [he elaborates elsewhere, "there were many dirty secrets, many acts of cowardice"]. Dolores Ibárruri, Carrillo, Mije, Anton, Delicado are good examples of what we say though not the only ones.

The persecution of dissidents within the PCE increased over time.

Between 1947–1951 things get progressively worse. The persecution inside the party increases as do the arrests of comrades who come to Spain from France. But it wasn't just this, as we would find out later, assassination had become a tool of repression and management of the party...The decision to assassinate militants was taken in the Secretariat of the PCE. If the target of an assassination fled to Spain his presence was betrayed to the Spanish authorities through the broadcasts of Radio España Independiente.

Interrogations were cruel: "Carrillo and Anton inflicted true terror. Some comrades came to the brink of insanity during the rounds of interrogation, and others were driven to suicide by the despicable accusations made against them."

The book lists party members who were betrayed or murdered: Juanchu de Portugalete (1944), Gabriel León Trilla (1945; "the decision to eliminate Trilla belongs to Santiago Carrillo and Dolores Ibárruri"), Jesus Hernandez (1946), Lino (1950), Joan Comorera (1954), Monzon, Quiñones, Luis Montero, and Jose el Valenciano. Even generals Modesto and Líster himself were at one point targeted by the PCE leadership, only to be inadvertently saved by Stalin, who praised them in the presence of Ibárruri, Carrillo, and Anton.

During that period the PCE also persecuted members in northwestern Spain. They included Victor Garcia, alias El Brasileño, a local leader in Galicia, and his deputy Teófilo Fernández. Garcia had previously expressed dissatisfaction with the party's exiled leadership and was labelled a provocateur. Party documents showed that he was suspected of being a police informant, but historian Lupe Martínez contends that he had been accused of being in contact with Allied forces in helping downed airmen cross into Portugal from France through Galicia. His planned murder was mentioned as early as 1946, but only conducted in 1948. He was shot in the head in a wooded area in the town of Moalde, after which the regional PCE liaison wrote "At last we have hunted him down. This riffraff withstood us like a leech. We managed to catch him in Lalín, from where he directed certain adventurous, uncontrolled groups. He is a provocateur who has given us many troubles; though belatedly, we have eliminated him." His body was discovered days later and buried in the local cemetery.

=== The exile, part II (1960–1977) ===
At the 6th Congress of the PCE, held in Prague from 28 to 31 January 1960, 64-year-old Ibárruri ceded the post of secretary-general to Carrillo and accepted the honorary position of president. As confirmation of her retirement from active politics, she wrote her first memoir in 1960. The book, titled El Único Camino (The Only Way), was first published in Paris in 1962 and subsequently printed in Moscow in 1963. It was translated into English and published in New York in 1966 under a new title. In her second memoir, Memorias de Pasionaria, 1939–1977, Ibárruri notes that the childhood memories recorded in El Único Camino came to her in vivid detail.

On 10 November 1961, Ibárruri was awarded an honorary Doctorate in Historical Sciences by Moscow State University for her contributions to the development of Marxist theory. In her acceptance speech, she asserted that class struggle is the motor of history. In 1962, she attended the 10th Congress of the Italian Communist Party, held from 2 to 8 December in Rome, where she met Socialists, Christian-Democrats, and some church representatives. To the clerics, she remarked, "We are not as wicked as you think, and we are not as good as we probably think we are."

During the first few months of 1963, Ibárruri unsuccessfully appealed to the Spanish government to spare the life of executive committee member Julián Grimau. Before his execution, Grimau wrote to Ibárruri, saying, "My execution will be the last one." During the week of 13 May, Ibárruri unveiled a plaque in his honour on Building 11, Block 1, of the newly renamed Grimau Street in Moscow. On 5 December, she arrived in Havana to commemorate the 5th anniversary of the Cuban Revolution. Cuban leader Fidel Castro invited Ibárruri to move permanently to the island, but she declined.

On 15 April 1964, Ibárruri spoke at the banquet celebrating Nikita Khrushchev's 70th birthday. On 30 April, she shared the International Lenin Prize for Strengthening Peace Among Peoples, with three others. On 22 February 1965, Ibárruri requested that the Ministers of Foreign Affairs and the Spanish Army, as well as the defence attorney, appear as witnesses at the court martial of former Republican commander Justo López de la Fuente, who had been condemned to twenty-three years in prison. Everyone expected that he would be sentenced to death. Ibárruri held a press conference in Moscow to publicise these actions. On 27 February, the Captain General of the Madrid region annulled the proceedings. However, the initial sentence remained, and López later died in prison.

Sometime in 1965, Ibárruri flew from Paris to Dubrovnik to apologize to Josip Broz Tito as president of the PCE. On 17 May 1948, the Cominform, successor to the ECCI, had expelled Yugoslavia from the community of Socialist countries, and Ibárruri had supported this censure. The 20th Congress of the Communist Party of the Soviet Union, held from 14 to 26 February 1956, had repudiated the charges against Yugoslavia. Now, Ibárruri came face to face with the man she had slandered. She began to apologise profusely, but Tito interrupted her, saying, "Do not vex yourself, Dolores, do not worry. I know very well how things worked in those days. I know it perfectly. Furthermore, believe me, I most likely would have done what you did had I been in your situation." Ibárruri returned to visit Yugoslavia several times thereafter. In late December 1965, the Presidium of the Supreme Soviet of the USSR awarded Ibárruri the Order of Lenin medal. Between 1930 and 1991, a total of 431,418 decorations were given out, but only seventeen were awarded to foreigners.

Ibárruri chaired the editorial commission that wrote the four volumes of Guerra y revolución en España, 1936–1939 (War and Revolution in Spain, 1936–1939), which present the PCE's view of the Spanish Civil War. The volumes were published between 1966 and 1971.

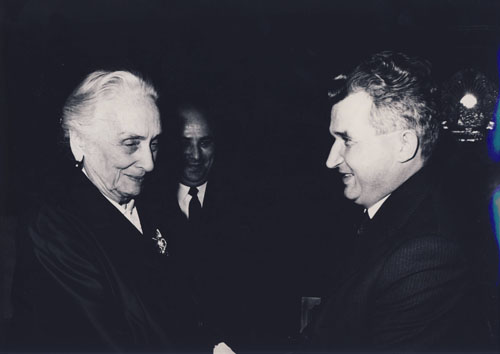
Dolores Ibárruri with Nicolae Ceaușescu during a visit to Bucharest, 1972

On 19 April 1969, former Republican general Juan Modesto died in Prague. Ibárruri delivered a brief eulogy. On 6 May 1970, the Spanish right-wing newspaper ABC reported that the PCE and the Kremlin had reached a new pact. According to the report, the Spanish party dropped its censure of the Soviet invasion of Czechoslovakia in exchange for the Kremlin's blessing on the party's wish to collaborate with non-Communist parties. The newspaper also reported that PCE president Dolores Ibárruri resided permanently in Moscow, while the secretary-general lived in Italy.

On 8 November 1972, Ibárruri's estranged husband, 82-year-old Julián Ruiz Gabiña, returned from a workers' clinic in Moscow to Somorrostro, expressing a desire "to rest and die in my land." On 14 March 1974, Ibárruri condemned the execution of 26-year-old Catalan anarchist Salvador Puig Antich on 2 March. She also noted the revolutionary political stance taken by Bishop Antonio Añoveros Ataún of Bilbao, who publicly defended Basque cultural identity and defied Franco's decision to remove him. On 20 November 1975, Spanish dictator Franco died. Ibárruri commented laconically, "May the earth rest lightly upon him." During the week of 17 November, Ibárruri was awarded the Order of the October Revolution. On 14 December, many representatives of Communist parties from around the world gathered in Rome to pay homage to her. The following summer, Ibárruri attended the 3rd Plenary of the Central Committee of the PCE, held 28–31 July 1976 in Rome, under the theme of "national reconciliation."

On the night of 24 January 1977, a commando unit of Spanish and Italian neo-Fascists killed three Communist labour-rights attorneys, a law student, and a manager at their law office in downtown Madrid; four others were seriously injured. On 16 February, Ibárruri asked the Spanish authorities in Moscow to allow her to return to Spain. She stated that she had travelled outside the USSR many times, that her profession was a publicist and contributor to newspapers and magazines, that she was the president of the PCE, and that she wanted to travel freely to her own country. On 22 February, the still-illegal PCE announced its list of candidates for the general elections on 15 June. Ibárruri was a candidate in two electoral districts, Madrid and Asturias, to ensure her election; Carrillo appeared in three. Despite a climate of fear and insecurity, the Spanish government legalized the PCE on 9 April, but the authorities denied Ibárruri a visa. On 27 April, Julián Ruiz stated that he would not be at the airport to greet his estranged wife, but added, "Nevertheless, she is the mother of my children, and I wish her health and a peaceful life." The PCE arranged for Ibárruri to land in Madrid with or without a visa on 13 May; however, on 12 May, the authorities relented and provided the visa.

=== Back in Madrid (1977–1989) ===
At 2:00 p.m. Moscow time on 13 May 1977, Ibárruri left Sheremetyevo Airport aboard an Aeroflot jet after a "very affectionate" send-off from Boris Ponomarev, Mikhail Suslov, three other civilians, and Colonel Sergeyev, the husband of Ibárruri's daughter. On the tarmac, a girl in traditional costume offered the departing president of the PCE a bouquet of flowers. At 7:59 p.m. Madrid time, the Aeroflot jetliner landed at Barajas Airport. The PCE did not give her an official welcome and secretary-general Carrillo was in Seville. Five hundred party members and sympathisers, some waving PCE flags and wearing red berets with a communist insignia, gathered at the airport. They went up to the observation deck to watch and cheer as she landed. Ibárruri then visited the office of the Registrar General of Fuencarral and officially changed her name from Isidora to Dolores.

Ibárruri's first campaign rally was held on 23 May at the Exhibition Fairgrounds of Bilbao, where she spoke before 30,000 to 50,000 supporters. She acknowledged feeling tired but volunteered to explain the workings of socialist countries, "where the workers can live very well without capitalism." However, the emotion of the day exhausted her, and an evening press conference had to be cancelled. The following day, she spoke at the Suárez Puerta Stadium in Avilés in front of "many thousands of workers." A 20-year-old eyewitness recalled, "The city wore red. 'The Internationale' was heard everywhere... the atmosphere, the silence when Pasionaria spoke, the explosion of joy that day, are unforgettable memories."

On 25 May, at the presentation of his book Eurocommunism and the State, Carrillo told a reporter that Ibárruri reminded him of Pablo Iglesias as he knew him as a child—a sick, elderly man who participated very little in party activities and often remained silent during meetings. On 28 May, Ibárruri spoke in Sama de Langreo, and the right-wing newspaper ABC admitted that she was drawing "multitudes." On 30 May, she affirmed in La Felguera that the same spirit which had motivated her in 1936 continued to drive her in support of the PCE and Asturias. On 8 June, a full house (6,000 people according to ABC, 8,000 according to La Vanguardia) listened to her at the Palacio de los Deportes in Oviedo, the capital of Asturias. The following day, she appeared at the national rally of the party held in the neighbouring province of León.

In the general elections held on 15 June, the Oviedo constituency saw 584,061 votes cast, with a voter turnout rate of 74.6%. The PCE received 60,297 votes (10.5% of the total), securing one seat for Dolores Ibárruri.

On 13 July at 10:05 a.m., as noted in her memoirs, Ibárruri returned to the Congress chamber she had left forty-one years earlier. Moments later, she took her place in the vice-presidential chair for the inaugural session. The following day, Radio España Independiente aired its final broadcast, number 108,300. On 22 July, the king opened Parliament. Ibárruri participated in the one-minute general standing ovation, though she remained seated. Earlier, as she entered Congress, a 56-year-old man in Falangist uniform gave the Roman salute and heckled her, saying, "Drop dead! If you had any shame, you would not have returned to Spain."

On 4 August, 87-year-old Ruiz died in a hospital residence in Barakaldo, and Ibárruri attended his funeral. She traveled to Moscow in October to celebrate the 60th anniversary of the Russian Revolution and did not return until 21 November.

Her ailing health led to her hospitalization three times during the first nine months after her return. Her age and frail condition prompted the regional branch of the PCE in Asturias to request her retirement and substitution as early as 21 November 1977. However, the central committee argued that her symbolic presence was important, and she served out her full term. On 31 October 1978, she cast a very loud "Yes" vote for the new Spanish Constitution. On 29 December, President Adolfo Suárez dissolved Congress and called new elections for 1 March 1979. The 84-year-old Ibárruri was not a candidate. Her life, along with that of every Communist, was put in danger on 23 February 1981, when Fascist elements of the Spanish armed forces and paramilitary police staged a coup.

Broadly speaking, the remaining years of Ibárruri's life were marked by a series of feminist rallies, political gatherings, congresses of the PSUC and PCE, presiding over meetings of the executive committee, and summer holidays in the Soviet Union. Ibárruri denounced Enver Hoxha's stance against Khrushchev during the Sino-Soviet Split, describing Hoxha as "a dog that bites the hand that feeds him". Survivors of the International Brigades came to celebrate her 90th birthday, and the PCE held a party at the Palacio de Deportes in Madrid for 15,000 to 20,000 well-wishers.

In October 1987, Ibárruri requested financial assistance from Congress, as she had not contributed to the national social security program and had no pension. Congress granted her a monthly allowance of 150,000 pesetas (approximately $1,250 in US dollars at the time). On 13 September 1989, she was hospitalized with severe pneumonia. Although she recovered and left the hospital on 15 October, she experienced a relapse on 7 November and died on 12 November at age 93. On 14 November, thousands of people paid homage as her body lay on a catafalque. Among those who paid their respects were veterans of the Civil War, war amputees, and the ambassadors of Cuba, Czechoslovakia, East Germany, Yugoslavia, and China, as well as the mayor of Madrid. On 16 November, a short cortege carried her body from the PCE headquarters to the Plaza de Colón, where Rafael Alberti and Secretary-General Julio Anguita delivered brief eulogies. She was then driven to Almudena Cemetery and interred near the grave of Pablo Iglesias. Thousands attended her funeral and chanted, "They shall not pass!" The mayors of several townships declared four days of official mourning.

== Monuments and memorials ==
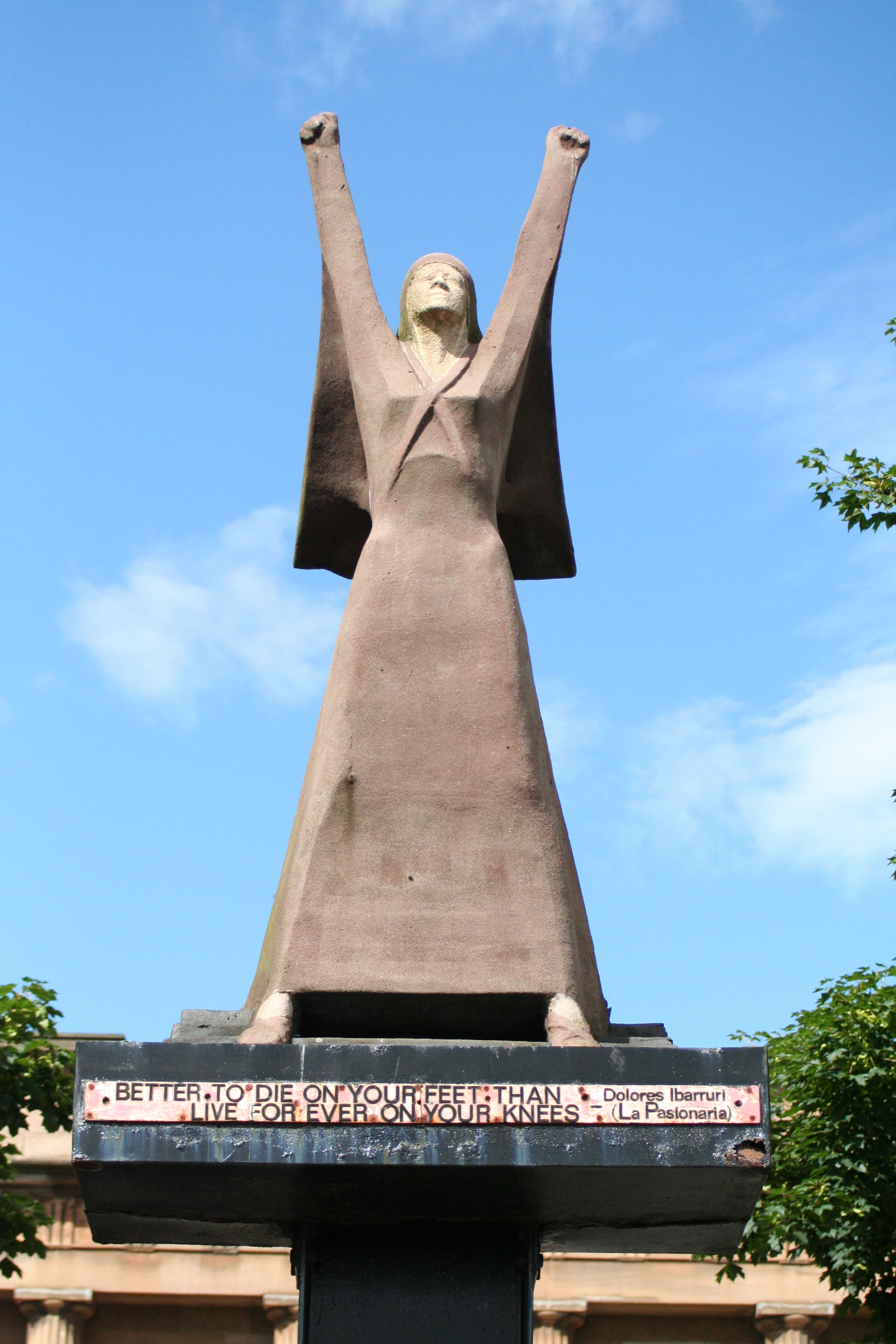
La Pasionaria statue in Glasgow, Scotland

Dolores Ibárruri served as inspiration for artist Arthur Dooley, who was commissioned in 1974 by the International Brigade Association of Scotland to create a monument commemorating the 2,100 British volunteers of the International Brigade. These ordinary men and women joined the Republican forces in the Spanish Civil War to fight against Franco's regime. The monument’s inscription is dedicated to the 534 volunteers who died in the conflict, including 65 from Glasgow, where the monument is situated.

The statue was funded by money raised from Trade Unionists and Labour movement supporters. However, the £3,000 raised was insufficient to cover the artist's plans to cast the statue in bronze. Instead, an armature was welded together from scrap iron and covered in fiberglass. The final version of the monument is a stylized female figure representing Dolores Ibárruri, depicted in a long dress, standing with legs apart and arms raised. On the plinth, Dooley carved Dolores's famous slogan: "Better to die on your feet than live forever on your knees." Originally used by the Mexican revolutionary leader Emiliano Zapata, Ibárruri gave the phrase new meaning when she used it during the miners' strike in Asturias, Spain, in 1934.

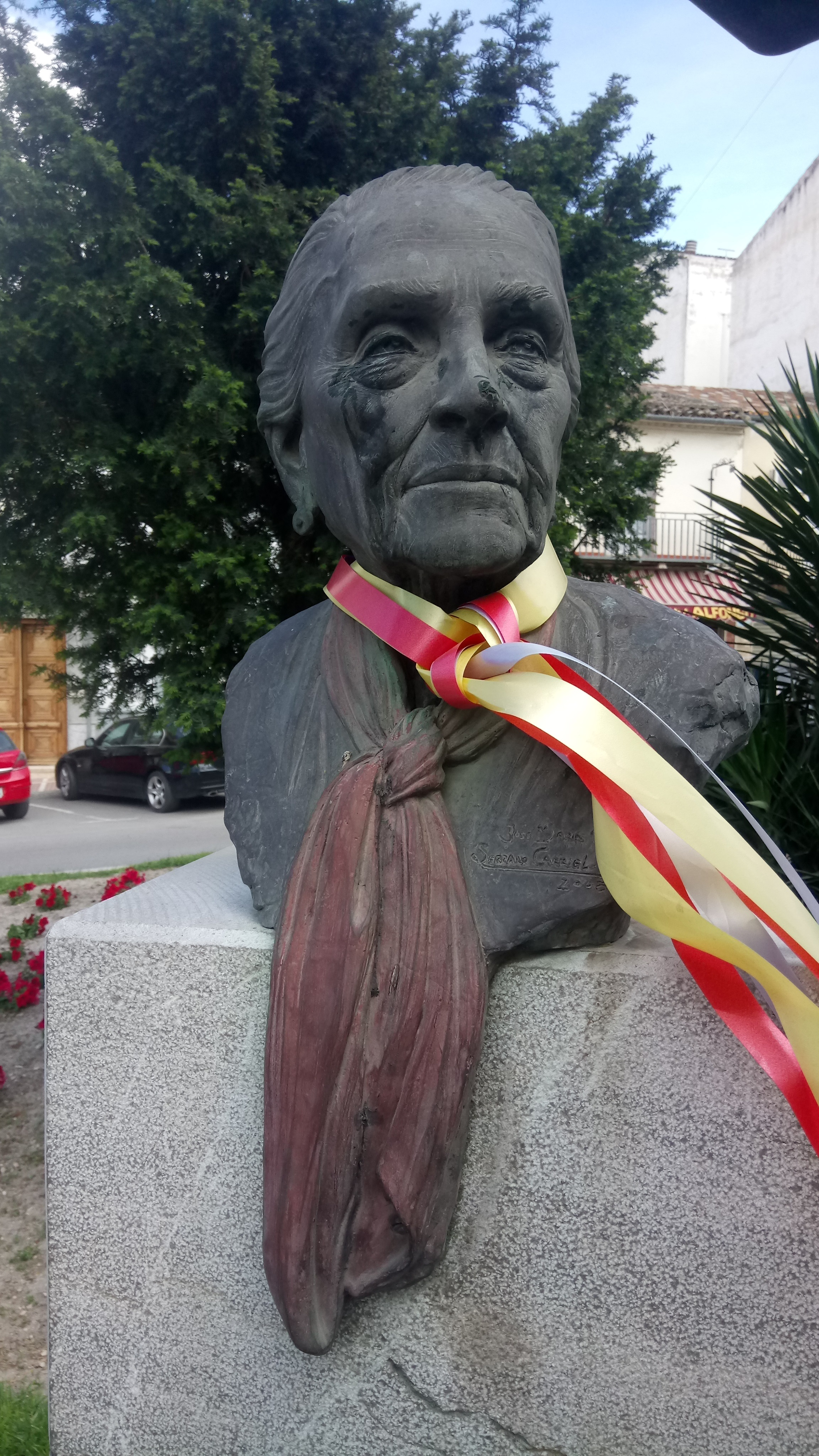
Bust of Ibárruri by José María Serrano Carriel in Jódar, Spain

Over time, the B-listed statue fell into extremely poor condition, generating criticism from the public, elected officials, and trade unionists. A restoration project was carried out between April and August 2010, and the monument was re-dedicated on 23 August 2010 by the Leader of the Council, Bailie Gordon Matheson, and the General Secretary of the Scottish Trades Union Congress, Grahame Smith, in the presence of Thomas Watters, 97, a surviving International Brigade veteran. Watters was a veteran of the Scottish Ambulance Unit, which worked on the front lines in Spain to aid wounded fighters and volunteers from around the world.

In February 2017, the People's Party of the Basque Country called for a street named after her to be renamed due to her “terrible role in the Spanish Civil War” and her close association with Stalin.

== List of works ==
- Dolores Ibárruri: Speeches & Articles 1936–1938, New York, 1938.
- El único camino, Moscow, 1963. (republished in 2023 by Akal with ISBN 978-84-460-5325-5)
- Memorias de Dolores Ibarruri, Pasionaria: la lucha y la vida, Barcelona, 1985. ISBN 978-8432043628
- They Shall Not Pass: The Autobiography of La Pasionaria, New York, 1966.
- Memorias de Pasionaria, 1939–1977: Me faltaba España, Barcelona, 1984. ISBN 978-8432058301

== In popular culture ==
The Brazilian punk rock band Blind Pigs included an English-language song about Ibárruri in their 2002 album Blind Pigs.

In Anthony Powell's novel Casanova's Chinese Restaurant, Norah and Eleanor have a picture of La Pasionaria on their mantelpiece.

In Ernest Hemingway's novel For Whom the Bell Tolls, El Sordo's unit debates La Pasionaria's motives for sending her son to the Soviet Union during the Spanish Civil War while under attack from pro-Franco forces.

The Glasgow-based fusion band Inyal included an instrumental song dedicated to Ibárruri, entitled "Pasionaria," on their 2017 album INYAL.

The American sculptor Jo Davidson created a portrait bust of Ibárruri in 1938. Davidson describes his sittings with Ibárruri at his hotel in Madrid in his autobiography, Between Sittings: An Informal Autobiography.

In 2012, Nadezhda Tolokonnikova, a member of the Russian protest punk band Pussy Riot, wore a T-shirt with the phrase "¡No Pasarán!" and an image of a raised clenched fist during her trial.

== Bibliography ==
- Yusta Rodrigo, M. (2023). Dolores Ibárruri, Pasionaria (1895–1989): Communist Woman of Steel, Global Icon. In: de Haan, F. (eds) The Palgrave Handbook of Communist Women Activists around the World. Palgrave Macmillan, Cham. https://doi.org/10.1007/978-3-031-13127-1_7

== See also ==
- Aurora Picornell
- Carolina Bunjes
- Jorge Semprún

== Notes ==
Preceded by Position created	President of the Communist Party of Spain; 1960–1989	Succeeded by Position abolished

Preceded by José Díaz	General Secretary of the Communist Party of Spain; 1944–1960	Succeeded by Santiago Carrillo
