= Picornell =

Picornell is a Spanish surname. Notable people with the surname include:

- André Picornell (born 2004), Swedish professional footballer
- Aurora Picornell (1912–1937), Spanish seamstress, unionist, and feminist activist
- Bernat Picornell (1883–1970), Spanish swimmer and sports leader
- Juan Picornell (1759–1825), Spanish-born revolutionary
- Juan Segui Picornell (born 1947), Spanish former sports shooter

== See also ==
- Piscines Bernat Picornell, a swimming venue situated in the Olympic Ring in Montjuïc
