= 1277 Dolores =

Main-belt asteroid

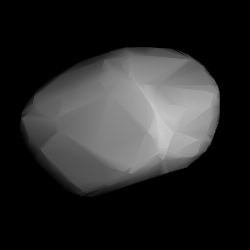
- Modelled shape of Dolores from its lightcurve

Discovery
- Discovered by: G. Neujmin
- Discovery site: Simeiz Obs.
- Discovery date: 18 April 1933

Designations
- Named after: Dolores Ibárruri (Spanish communists)
- Alternative designations: 1933 HA · 1925 SE; 1929 NB · 1942 JA; 1951 PB
- Minor planet category: main-belt · (middle) background

Orbital characteristics
- Epoch 4 September 2017 (JD 2458000.5)
- Uncertainty parameter 0
- Observation arc: 84.05 yr (30,699 days)
- Aphelion: 3.3418 AU
- Perihelion: 2.0598 AU
- Semi-major axis: 2.7008 AU
- Eccentricity: 0.2373
- Orbital period (sidereal): 4.44 yr (1,621 days)
- Mean anomaly: 315.34°
- Mean motion: 0° 13^{m} 19.56^{s} / day
- Inclination: 6.9674°
- Longitude of ascending node: 247.04°
- Argument of perihelion: 46.992°

Physical characteristics
- Mean diameter: 23.72±7.44 km 27.05±0.90 km 27.64±2.2 km 32.587±0.802 km 32.59±0.80 km
- Synodic rotation period: 17.19±0.01 h
- Geometric albedo: 0.063±0.013; 0.08±0.04; 0.0879±0.016; 0.095±0.007
- Spectral type: Tholen = C SMASS = Cb; C B–V = 0.730; U–B = 0.378
- Absolute magnitude (H): 11.05; 11.11±0.11

1277 Dolores (prov. designation: 1933 HA) is a carbonaceous background asteroid from the central regions of the asteroid belt, approximately 27 kilometers (17 miles) in diameter. It was discovered on 18 April 1933, by Soviet astronomer Grigory Neujmin at the Simeiz Observatory on the Crimean peninsula. The asteroid was named after Spanish communist Dolores Ibárruri.

== Orbit and classification ==
Dolores is a non-family asteroid of the main belt's background population when applying the hierarchical clustering method to its proper orbital elements. It orbits the Sun in the central main belt at a distance of 2.1–3.3 AU once every 4 years and 5 months (1,621 days). Its orbit has an eccentricity of 0.24 and an inclination of 7° with respect to the ecliptic. The asteroid was first identified as 1925 SE at Simeiz Observatory in September 1925. The body's observation arc begins at Yerkes Observatory (or Simeiz) in June 1933, approximately 2 months after its official discovery observation.

== Naming ==
This minor planet was named after Spanish communists Dolores Ibárruri (1895–1989). Known as "La Pasionária" (Passionflower), she co-founded the communist party in Spain in 1920, and lead the party while in exile. Dolores Ibárruri returned to Spain in 1977, and became a member of the parliament. The official naming citation was mentioned in The Names of the Minor Planets by Paul Herget in 1955 (H 117).

== Physical characteristics ==
In the Tholen classification, Dolores is a carbonaceous C-type asteroid, while in the SMASS classification, it is classified as a Cb-subtype, that transitions to the brighter B-type asteroids. It has also been characterized as a C-type by Pan-STARRS photometric survey.

=== Rotation period ===
In July 2000, a rotational lightcurve of Dolores was obtained from photometric observations by American astronomer Robert Stephens. Lightcurve analysis gave a well-defined rotation period of 17.19 hours with a brightness amplitude of 0.45 magnitude (U=3), indicative of a somewhat elongated shape.

=== Diameter and albedo ===
According to the surveys carried out by the Infrared Astronomical Satellite IRAS, the Japanese Akari satellite and the NEOWISE mission of NASA's Wide-field Infrared Survey Explorer, Dolores measures between 23.72 and 32.59 kilometers in diameter and its surface has an albedo between 0.063 and 0.095. The Collaborative Asteroid Lightcurve Link adopts the result obtained by IRAS, that is, an albedo of 0.0879 and a diameter of 27.64 kilometers based on an absolute magnitude of 11.05.
