= Rubén Ruiz Ibárruri =

Spanish military officer and Soviet commander (1920-1942)

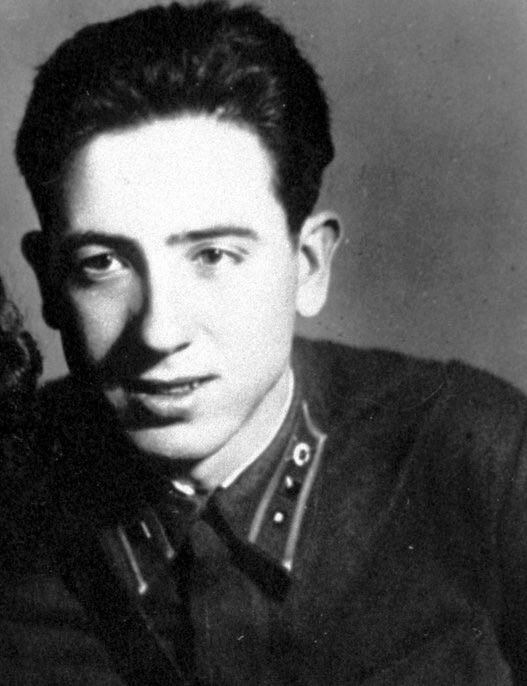
- Born: January 9, 1920; Somorrostro, Biscay Province, Kingdom of Spain
- Died: September 4, 1942 (aged 22); Srednyaya Akhtuba, Stalingrad Oblast, Soviet Union
- Burial place: Square of the Fallen Heroes, Volgograd
- Military career
- Allegiance: Spanish Republic (1936–1939); Soviet Union (1939–1942)
- Service years: 1936–1942
- Rank: Lieutenant
- Conflicts: Spanish Civil War; World War II (DOW)
- Awards: Hero of the Soviet Union; Order of Lenin; Order of the Red Banner

Rubén Ruiz Ibárruri (Russian: Рубе́н Руи́с Иба́ррури; January 9, 1920 – September 3, 1942) was a Spanish military officer and Soviet commander of the 100th Machine Gun Company of an independent training battalion of the 35th guards rifle division of the 62nd army of the Stalingrad Front. He was posthumously awarded the rank of captain of the Guards unit, and also 2 times the Order of the Red Banner (July 22, 1941, and October 22, 1942). By the decree of the Supreme Soviet of the USSR, he was posthumously awarded the title of Hero of the Soviet Union (August 23, 1956) and awarded the Order of Lenin (August 23, 1956). He was a Lieutenant of the International Brigade during the Spanish Civil War. The asteroid 2423 Ibarruri (discovered by Soviet astronomer Lyudmila Zhuravleva) was named in his honour in 1972. He died in the Battle of Stalingrad.

== Biography ==
=== Early life ===
Rubén Ruiz Ibárruri was born on January 9, 1920, in the village of Somorrostro in the family of one of the founders of the Communist party of Spain, Julián Ruiz Gabiña, and the famous revolutionary, the future General Secretary of the party, Dolores Ibárruri.

While still a child, Ibárruri took part in political activities. When he was thirteen, he distributed illegal communist leaflets and had to evade the police. In 1935, after his mother was imprisoned, he and Amaya were sent to the Soviet Union. Rubén resided in Moscow with the Bolshevik leader Panteleimon Lepeshinsky and his wife, biologist Olga Lepeshinskaya. He took up an apprenticeship in the Joseph Stalin 1st State Factory for Automobiles.

=== Spanish Civil War ===
After the outbreak of the Spanish Civil War, the sixteen-year-old Ibárruri approached the Spanish Embassy in Moscow under a pseudonym and - after lying about his age - volunteered to fight on the Republican side. He joined a Spanish Republican Army mountain infantry unit in Major Juan Modesto's corps. When General Alexander Rodimtsev met him in August 1937, he already held the rank of a corporal. After participating in the Battle of the Ebro, he was promoted to sergeant.

During February 1939, Ibárruri crossed the Pyrenees into France, with the remnants of the defeated Republican Popular Army, and was interned in the Argelès-sur-Mer concentration camp. He managed to escape and reach the Soviet Embassy in Paris, from where he returned to Moscow at April, reuniting with his mother and his sister.

Ibárruri attempted to enroll into the Stalingrad Military Flight School, but was rejected on medical grounds. He then entered the Moscow All-Russian Central Executive Committee Military Academy. After graduation, Second Lieutenant Ibárruri was stationed in the machine-gun platoon of the Moscow 1st Proletarian Division's 175th Company.

=== World War II ===
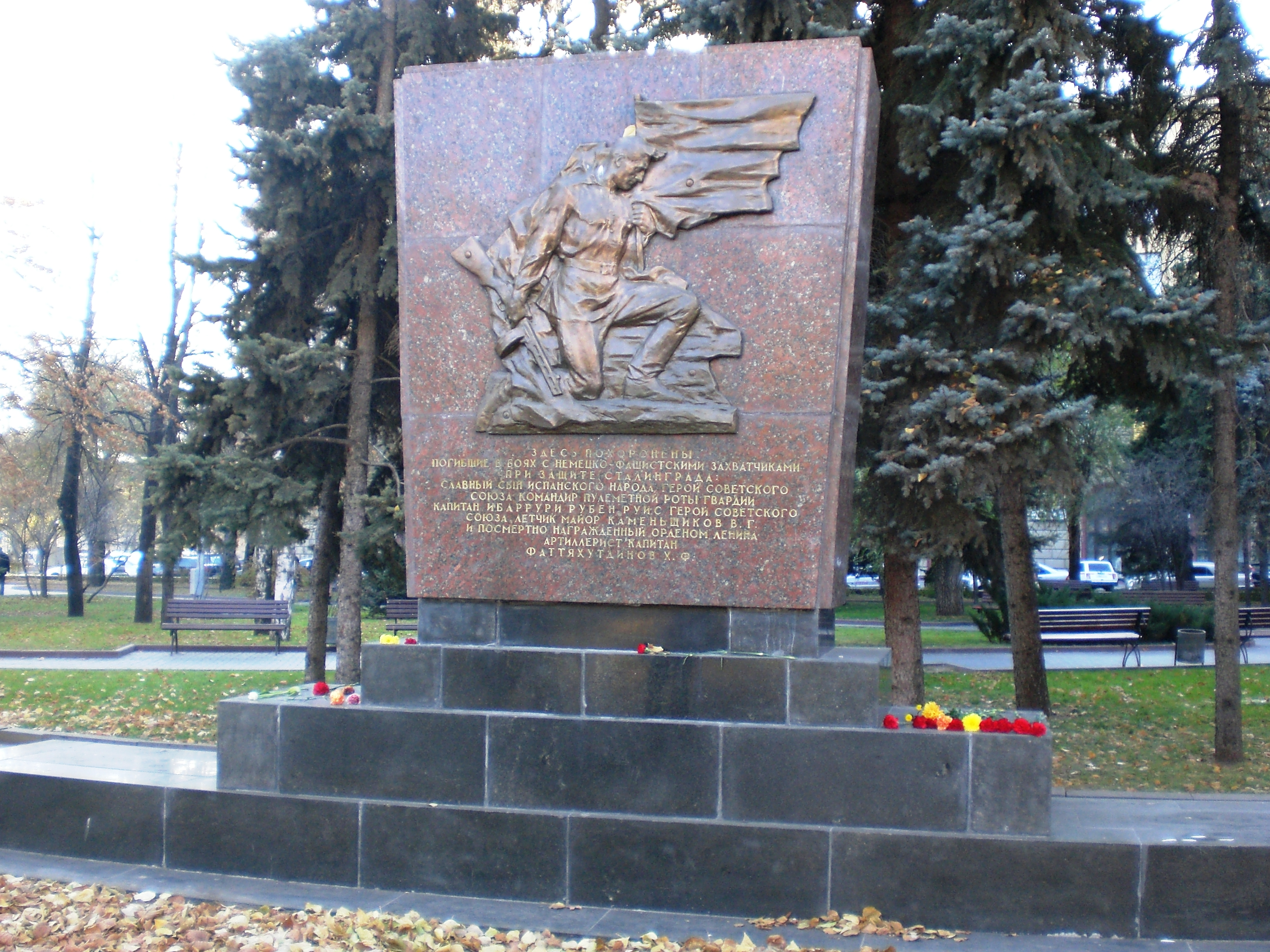
Ibárruri's memorial in Volgograd.

In early July 1941, soon after Germany invaded the Soviet Union, the 1st Division confronted the enemy in the town of Borisov, near the Berezina River. Ibárruri's platoon covered the retreat of the regiment across the river. He was severely wounded during the battle, and evacuated to the Kuibyshev where he recovered and associated with Leonid Khrushchev who was also recovering there.

After recovering, Lieutenant Ibárruri joined the 35th Guards Rifle Division, which was formed from the 8th Airborne Corps in August 1942, as the commander of the 100th Machine Gun Company. The division was consigned to the 62nd Army, which defended Stalingrad. When arriving in the area, the division was rushed to the village of Samofalovka, 30 kilometres north-west of Stalingrad, to halt the advance of the German army toward the Volga River. By the night of 23 August 1942, only a part of the 35th reached the area. Ibárruri's battalion, commanded by Captain A.A. Stolyarov, was deployed in the Kotluban train station and immediately attacked by German forces. Stolyarov was killed in the fight, and Ibárruri replaced him, leading the soldiers while the rest of the division arrived. In the morning, he was hit by a bullet in the abdomen and sent to a field hospital in Srednyaya Akhtuba - a town on the other side of the Volga, 20 kilometres east of Stalingrad. He died from his wound on 4 September 1942.

On 2 November 1948, his remains were re-buried in the Square of Fallen Heroes, on the Mamayev Kurgan.

== Awards ==
- Hero of the Soviet Union (23 August 1956, posthumously)
- Order of the Red Banner (September 1941 by president Mikhail Kalinin; October 1942)
