= 2423 Ibarruri =

Rare-type Mars-crossing asteroid

Discovery
- Discovered by: L. Zhuravleva
- Discovery site: Crimean Astrophysical Obs.
- Discovery date: 14 July 1972

Designations
- Named after: Rubén Ibárruri (Hero of the Soviet Union)
- Alternative designations: 1972 NC · 1930 SV; 1943 TB · 1956 VC; 1972 PB
- Minor planet category: Mars-crosser

Orbital characteristics
- Epoch 4 September 2017 (JD 2458000.5)
- Uncertainty parameter 0
- Observation arc: 60.59 yr (22,129 days)
- Aphelion: 2.8068 AU
- Perihelion: 1.5702 AU
- Semi-major axis: 2.1885 AU
- Eccentricity: 0.2825
- Orbital period (sidereal): 3.24 yr (1,183 days)
- Mean anomaly: 315.42°
- Inclination: 4.0571°
- Longitude of ascending node: 264.96°
- Argument of perihelion: 80.645°

Physical characteristics
- Dimensions: 4.899±1.085; 6.50 km (calculated)
- Synodic rotation period: 73.08±0.10 h 139.79±0.04 h (Note: Pravec (2011) web: lightcurve plot for (2423) Ibarruri with a rotation period 139.79±0.04 hours with a brightness amplitude of 0.74 mag. Summary figures at Collaborative Asteroid Lightcurve Link (CALL)); 139.9±0.2 h 139.92±0.01 h
- Geometric albedo: 0.20 (assumed); 0.330±0.167
- Spectral type: SMASS = A L · S · C
- Absolute magnitude (H): 13.3 · 13.44±1.15 · 13.20 · 13.3

2423 Ibarruri, provisional designation 1972 NC, is an eccentric, tumbling and rare-type asteroid, classified as slow rotator and sizable Mars-crosser from the inner regions of the asteroid belt, approximately 5 kilometers in diameter.

The asteroid was discovered by Russian–Ukrainian astronomer Lyudmila Zhuravleva at the Crimean Astrophysical Observatory in Nauchnyj, on 14 July 1972. It was named after Spanish communist Rubén Ruiz Ibárruri.

== Orbit and classification ==
Ibarruri orbits the Sun in the inner main-belt at a distance of 1.6–2.8 AU once every 3 years and 3 months (1,183 days). Its orbit has an eccentricity of 0.28 and an inclination of 4° with respect to the ecliptic.

== Physical characteristics ==
The spectral type of the asteroid is that of a rare A-type in the SMASS taxonomy, with its surface consisting of almost pure olivine, which gives the body a very reddish color. As of November 2015, only 17 minor planets of this type are known.

As a spectroscopic A-type asteroid, it belongs to the larger group of bodies with a silicaceous composition. However, the Collaborative Asteroid Lightcurve Link classifies the asteroid into the carbonaceous group, despite the fact that is assumes a relatively high geometric albedo of 0.20, which is rather typical for stony asteroids.

=== Slow rotator and tumbler ===
Ibarruri has a notably slow rotation period of 140 hours, and seems to be in a non-principal axis rotation (NPAR), colloquially called as "tumbling".

== Naming ==
This minor planet was named after Rubén Ruiz Ibárruri (1920–1942), son of Spanish communist leader Dolores Ibárruri and a posthumous Hero of the Soviet Union. He enlisted in the Soviet army and died in the early stage of the Battle of Stalingrad in September 1942. The official naming citation was published by the Minor Planet Center on 8 February 1982 (M.P.C. 6649).
