= Leonid Khrushchev =

Soviet pilot and son of Nikita Khrushchev

- Леонид Хрущёв
- Khrushchev in the 1940s
- Born: Leonid Nikitovich Khrushchev; 10 November 1917; Yuzovka, Ukrainian People's Republic
- Died: 11 March 1943 (aged 25) near Zhizdra, Russian SFSR, Soviet Union
- Education: Zhukovsky Air Force Engineering Academy
- Occupation: Fighter pilot
- Political party: CPSU
- Spouse: Liuba Sizykh
- Partner: Esther Naumovna Etinger
- Children: 2
- Parents: Nikita Khrushchev (father); Yefrosinia Pisareva (mother)
- Awards: Order of the Red Banner; Order of the Patriotic War, 1st class

Leonid Nikitovich Khrushchev (Russian: Леонид Никитович Хрущёв; 10 November 1917 – 11 March 1943) was a Soviet fighter pilot and the son of Nikita Khrushchev. Khrushchev served as a fighter pilot in the Soviet Air Forces during the Winter War and the Eastern Front of World War II. Khrushchev's plane was shot down in 1943 but his death was never confirmed and he was listed as missing in action. The exact circumstances of his death remain unknown and are the subject of conspiracy theories.

== Early life ==
Leonid Nikitovich Khrushchev was born on 10 November 1917 in Yuzovka (present-day Donetsk) in the Ukrainian People's Republic, three days after the October Revolution, the second child of Nikita Khrushchev and his first wife Yefrosinia Pisareva. He graduated from high school in 1932 and afterwards went to work in a factory. During high school, he received two reprimands from Komsomol: one for drunkenness and lack of discipline, and the other for failure to pay for membership fees.

== Military career ==
In 1933, Khrushchev joined the Soviet Air Forces and attended the flight school in Balashov. He graduated in 1937 and completed advanced training courses for Air Force command personnel in Ulyanovsk the next year. He briefly worked as a flight instructor in Moscow and Kiev before enrolling the Zhukovsky Air Force Engineering Academy in February 1939. He was transferred to the Engels Military Aviation School in February 1940 and graduated in May.

Khrushchev was part of the 134th Bomber Aviation Regiment, 46th Air Division, stationed in the Andreapol, Kalinin Oblast. Following the outbreak of the Winter War in November 1939, he completed over thirty sorties in the Arkhangelsky Ar-2 and bombed the Mannerheim Line. According to Stepan Mikoyan, the son of Anastas Mikoyan, Khrushchev had personally requested to be sent to the frontline. After the Winter War finished in March 1940, he volunteered to stay at the front.

Following the German invasion of the Soviet Union in July 1941, Khrushchev's regiment fought on the Eastern Front as part of the 22nd Army. During the summer of 1941, he completed twelve combat missions and was presented with the Order of the Red Banner. On July 26, Khrushchev's plane was hit by Luftwaffe fighters near Moscow, forcing him to crash land and hospitalizing him with a broken leg, with the bone protruding through his boot. A doctor wanted to amputate the leg until Khrushchev threatened him with a pistol. During his recovery in Kuybyshev, he associated with Rubén Ruiz Ibárruri. After recovery, his injured leg was shorter than the other. Impatient while idle, Khrushchev would shoot bottles on friends' heads for entertainment, and in one incident he accidentally killed a drunken Soviet Navy officer. Although court-martialled, he was allowed to return to be a fighter pilot again.

== Disappearance ==
On 11 March 1943, Khrushchev's plane, a Yak-7B fighter, was shot down near Zhizdra and he was presumably killed. The pilots of his squadron saw his plane explode and disintegrate in the air after being hit by fire from a German Focke-Wulf Fw 190, allegedly while attempting to shield another pilot with his own plane. However, even though the area of his approximate crash was under Soviet partisans' control, and several planes attempted to locate his plane's wreckage on the next night, his body was never found. This, together with the fact that his father was already a member of the Politburo and one of the most important political figures in the Soviet Union, gave birth to a number of conspiracy theories about the circumstances of his death.

Two months after his disappearance, Khrushchev was posthumously awarded with the Order of the Patriotic War, 1st class.

== See also ==
- List of unsolved deaths

== Bibliography ==
- Taubman, William (2003), Khrushchev: The Man and His Era, W.W. Norton & Co., ISBN 978-0-393-32484-6
- The Lost Khrushchev: A Journey into the Gulag of the Russian Mind. By Nina Khrushcheva. Tate Publishing; 320 pages;
