= Aurora Picornell =

Spanish political martyr (1912–1937)

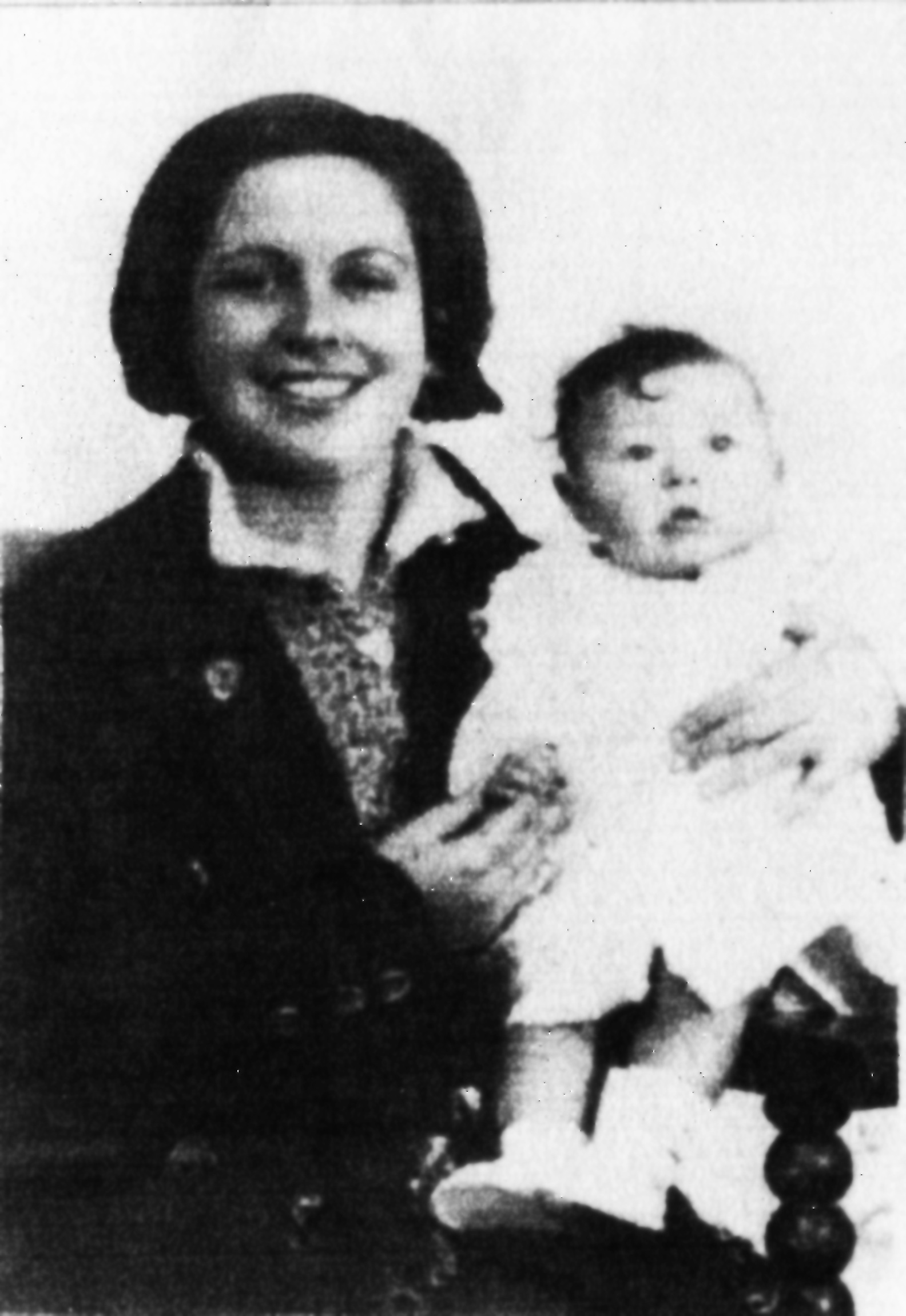
- Born: Aurora Picornell Femenias; 1 October 1912; Palma, Majorca
- Died: 5 January 1937 (aged 24); Porreres, Majorca
- Occupations: Seamstress, politician, trade unionist
- Organization: International Red Aid
- Political party: Communist Party of Spain

Aurora Picornell Femenias (1 October 1912 – 5 January 1937) was a Spanish seamstress, unionist and feminist activist, member of the Communist Party of Spain (PCE). She earned the sobriquet of "La Pasionaria mallorquina" ("La Pasionaria of Majorca"). In 1937, she was detained and murdered by Rebel faction forces.

== Life ==
Picornell was born in Palma, Majorca in the El Molinar district on 1 October 1912. She was a seamstress and political activist.

She was the sixth of seven siblings. She became politically active at a young age. At age 14 she left school to begin working as a seamstress.

As a pre-adolescent she was a feminist and was involved in anti-clericalism against the Roman Catholic church.

In 1931, she organized the seamstresses' union in the Balearic Islands. Later she joined the Communist Party of Spain (PCE), in which she was one of the main leaders of their Balearic Federation. At 16 she published her first of many articles in the Communist newspaper Nuestra palabra ("Our Word").

She lived for some time in Valencia, where she married Komintern agent Heriberto Quiñones.

In 1934, she helped establish the Communist Party on the island of Menorca. At the outbreak of the Spanish Civil War, Majorca fell into the hands of the Francoist rebels after a military coup. Picornell was the first woman arrested in the Casa del Poble ("House of the People", i.e. Party headquarters), and incarcerated in Mallorca's women's prison. Her colleagues tried to negotiate an exchange of prisoners, but before that was achieved she was taken by Falangists to the convent of Montuiri, where she was tortured.

She was murdered on 5 January 1937 at the cemetery in Porreres 30 km from Palma with other seamstresses: Catalina Flaquer Pascual, Antonia Pascual Flaquer, Maria Pascual Flaquer, and Belarmina Gonzalez Rodriguez. They are remembered in Majorca as Les Roges des Molinar ("The Reds of El Molinar").

At age 22 she gave birth to her only daughter, Octubrina Roja.

Picornell's father Gabriel and two brothers Gabriel and Ignasi were also murdered. Her husband, who became a leading member of the underground communist party after the war, was detained in 1941 and executed by firing squad in 1942 after enduring months of torture. Aurora's younger brother Joan died shortly after being liberated from the Dachau concentration camp while her sister Llibertat exiled to Mexico and France.

== Legacy ==
Josep Articles Quetglas wrote, "Aurora Picornell, escrits 1930-1936". A school, IES Aurora Picornell, is named after her. A play based on her life has been written by Aina de Cos. The song 'Aurora' by the metal band Helevorn is about her. She is also remembered in a Woman's Trail in Mallorca.

== Books/Biographies ==
Author: David Ginard i Féron

- Aurora Picornell (1912–1937). De la història, al símbol (2016).
- Aurora Picornell. Feminismo, comunismo y memoria republicana en el siglo XX (2018).
