= Nina Khrushcheva (professor) =

Russian–American academic (born 1964)

- Нина Хрущёва
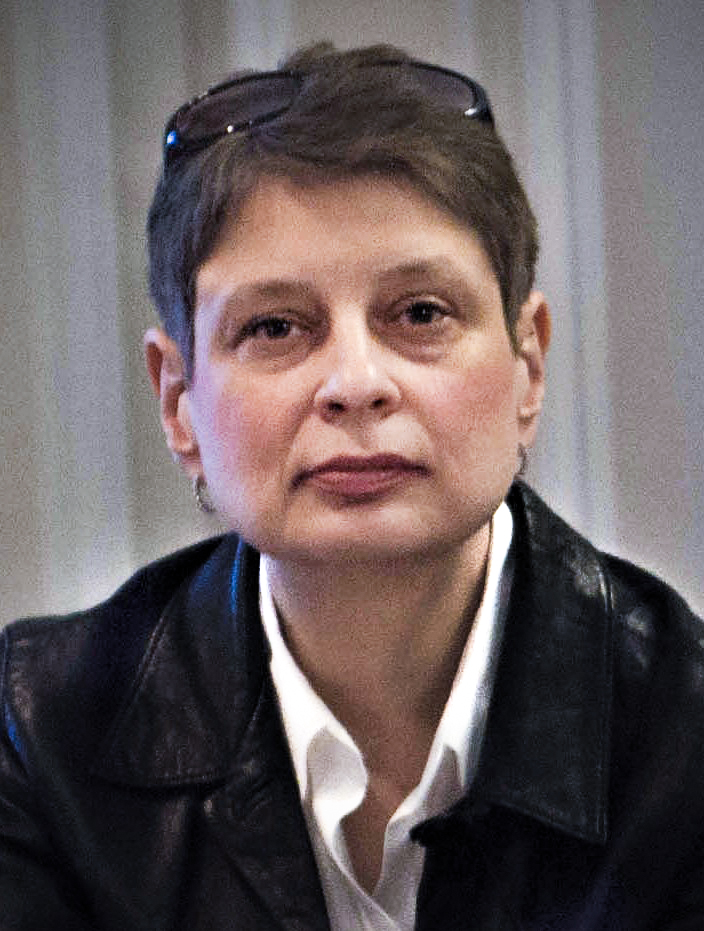
- Khrushcheva in 2015
- Born: Nina Lvovna Petrova; 30 October 1964 (age 61); Moscow, Russian SFSR, Soviet Union
- Education: Moscow State University; Princeton University
- Occupation: Professor of International Affairs
- Relatives: Nikita Khrushchev (great-grandfather); Leonid Khrushchev (grandfather)
- Writing career
- Genres: Non-fiction; history

Nina Lvovna Khrushcheva (Russian: Нина Львовна Хрущёва, IPA: [ˈnʲinə ˈlʲvovnə xrʊˈɕːɵvə]; née Petrova [Петрова]; born 30 October 1964) is a professor of International Affairs at The New School in New York City, and a Contributing Editor to Project Syndicate, an "Association of Newspapers Around the World".

== Family ==
Khrushcheva was born in Moscow, Russian SFSR, and is the great-granddaughter (and adoptive granddaughter) of former leader of the Soviet Union Nikita Khrushchev. When Khrushchev's son Leonid died in World War II, Nikita adopted Leonid's two-year-old daughter, Julia, who later became Nina's mother. Khrushcheva's father, Lev Petrov, died in 1970 at age 47.

== Education ==
Khrushcheva received a degree from Moscow State University in Russia, with a major in Russian in 1987, and a Ph.D. in comparative literature from Princeton University in New Jersey, in 1998.

== Career ==
From 2002 to 2004, Khrushcheva was an Adjunct Assistant Professor at the School of International and Public Affairs, Columbia University in New York. Khrushcheva is currently a professor of International Affairs in the graduate program at The New School in New York.

Khrushcheva is the author of numerous articles. She directed the Russia Project at the World Policy Institute, and has been a long-time contributor to Project Syndicate: Association of Newspapers Around the World, and editor of Project Syndicate's Russia column. Her articles have appeared in Newsweek, The New York Times, The Wall Street Journal, the Financial Times and other publications.

She had a two-year research appointment at the School of Historical Studies of Institute for Advanced Study in Princeton and then served as Deputy Editor of East European Constitutional Review at NYU School of Law. She is a member of the Council on Foreign Relations and a recipient of Great Immigrants: The Pride of America Award from Carnegie Corporation of New York.

She is the author of Imagining Nabokov: Russia Between Art and Politics (Yale UP, 2008) and The Lost Khrushchev: A Journey into the Gulag of the Russian Mind (Tate, 2014), co-author of In Putin's Footsteps: Searching for the Soul of an Empire Across Russia's Eleven Time Zones (St. Martin's Press, 2019) and (in Russian) "Nikita Khrushchev: An Outlier of the System" (Никита Хрущев: вождь вне системы) (Diletant.media, 2024).

In March 2022, Khrushcheva was critical of Vladimir Putin's conduct in the war that he waged against Ukraine, saying that her grandfather would have found Putin's conduct to be "despicable". In October 2022, she said, alluding to George Orwell's novel 1984, that in "Putin’s Russia, war is peace, slavery is freedom, ignorance is strength and illegally annexing a sovereign country’s territory is fighting colonialism."

In January 2024, she wrote that "Putin will throw everything he has at this war", suggesting "that Ukraine is unlikely to reclaim all of its territory" and "the west should focus on bolstering Ukraine’s defences, while preparing to seize any opportunity to engage in realistic talks with the Kremlin."

In March 2026, the Russian justice ministry designated Khrushcheva a "foreign agent".

== Work ==
- Imagining Nabokov: Russia Between Art and Politics. Yale University Press. 2008. ISBN 978-0-300-14824-4.
- The Lost Khrushchev: A Journey Into the Gulag of the Russian Mind. Tate Publishing & Enterprises. 2014. ISBN 9781629945446.
- In Putin's Footsteps: Searching for the Soul of an Empire Across Russia's Eleven Time Zones. St. Martin's Press. 2019. ISBN 978-1-250-16323-3.
