= Inyal =

Scottish folk band

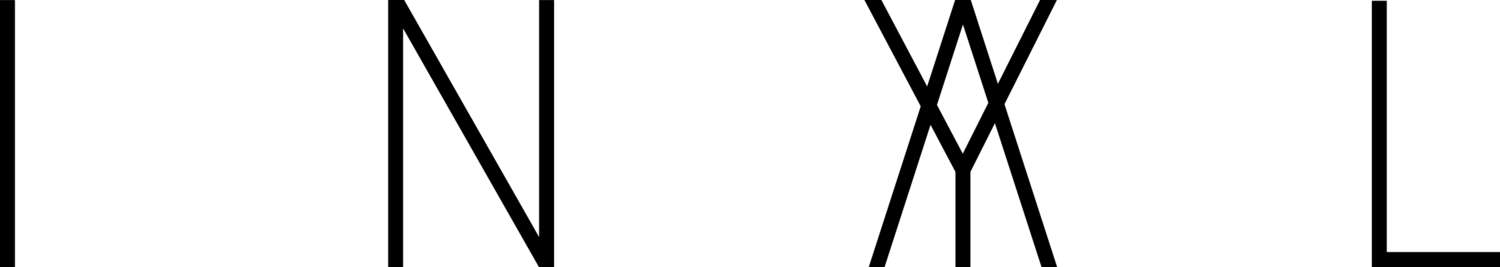

Background information
- Origin: Glasgow, Scotland
- Genres: Scottish folk music, folktronica
- Years active: 2016–present
- Members: Robbie Greig (fiddle); Hamish Macleod (electronics, keyboards, guitar); Conal McDonagh (uilleann pipes, whistle); Owen Sinclair (drums, percussion); Josie Duncan (vocals)
- Website: inyalband.com

Inyal (stylized INYAL) is a Scottish folktronica band. It was founded in 2016 in Glasgow.

== History ==
The band formed in early 2016 in Glasgow, Scotland. In 2017, it was nominated for "best up and coming artist" at the Scots Trad Music Awards. By 2019, the band had completed a tour of Australia as well as numerous concerts in Scotland.

== Musical style ==
Reviewing Inyal's debut album for The National, Jonny Jobson highlighted the band's Glasgow roots, writing that "the city’s musical spirit runs through the album like an artery". He noted that it was "peppered with soaring soundscapes that help give it an almost cinematic feel" and that it confidently blended elements of Scottish traditional music, electronica, and hip-hop. Alex Monaghan wrote for FolkWorld that the band "seem to focus on a dance club sound, strong beats and softer melodies, lots of alien noises and distortion without the harshness of metal music".

== Band members ==
- Robbie Greig – fiddle
- Hamish Macleod – electronics, keyboards, guitar
- Conal McDonagh – uilleann pipes, whistle
- Owen Sinclair – drums, percussion
- Josie Duncan – vocals

== Discography ==
- INYAL (2018)
