= Rosario Hernández Diéguez =

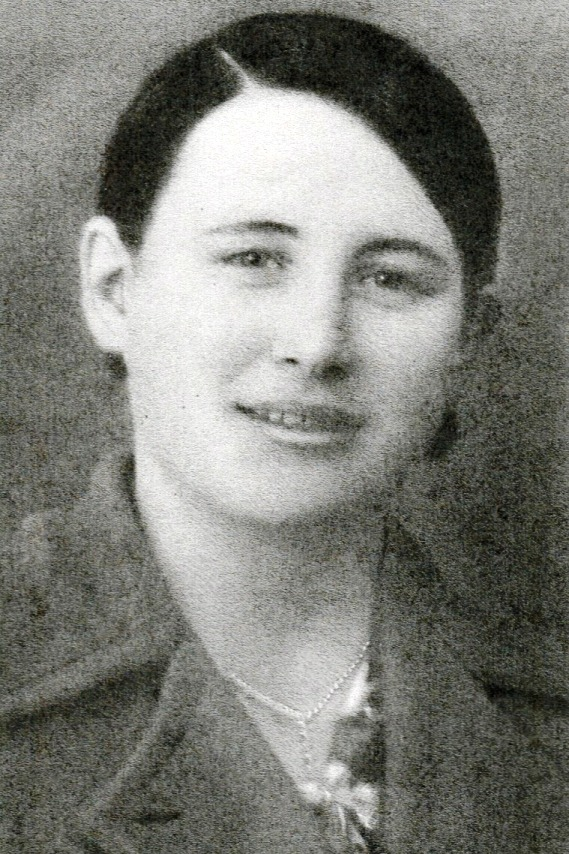
- Born: 17 February 1916; Vigo, Spain
- Died: 3 September 1936 (aged 20); Vigo, Spain
- Other name: A Calesa
- Occupation: newspaper hawker
- Organizations: Unión General de Trabajadores; Spanish Socialist Workers' Party
- Known for: trade unionist activism; victim of Franco's repression

Rosario Hernández Diéguez (nickname, A Calesa; Vigo, 17 February 1916 – Vigo, 3 September 1936) was a Spanish Galician newspaper hawker and trade unionist, affiliated with Unión General de Trabajadores (UGT) and Spanish Socialist Workers' Party (Partido Socialista Obrero Español) (PSOE). Raped, mutilated, tortured, she died young, a victim of Franco's repression. A street in her hometown bears her name.

== Biography ==
Rosario Hernández Diéguez was the daughter of an anarchist railwayman. Her home was on Calle Pino in Vigo. Everyone knew her by her nickname, "A Calesa".

She worked as a newspaper hawker in the doorway of the society "El Gimnasio" on Calle del Príncipe, reading out the news in the newspapers. She visited the UGT's Casa del pueblo of the UGT, and attended PSOE meetings. In sympathy with the latter, she actively participated in the worker demonstrations of the time.

Hernandez fled with the uprising of 18 July 1936. She was captured and arrested on 3 September 1936. (Note: According to the Concello de Vigo (vigo.org), Hernandez was arrested on 20 July 1936.) Imprisoned in the city's María Berdiales Fronton, she received meals brought in by her sister, Maria. Insolent, rather than submissive, devoted and obedient, she was shaved, raped, mutilated, and murdered in a Falange barracks. Her body was anchored to an iron grill before it was thrown off a boat in the Ria de Vigo, near the Cíes Islands.

== Legacy ==
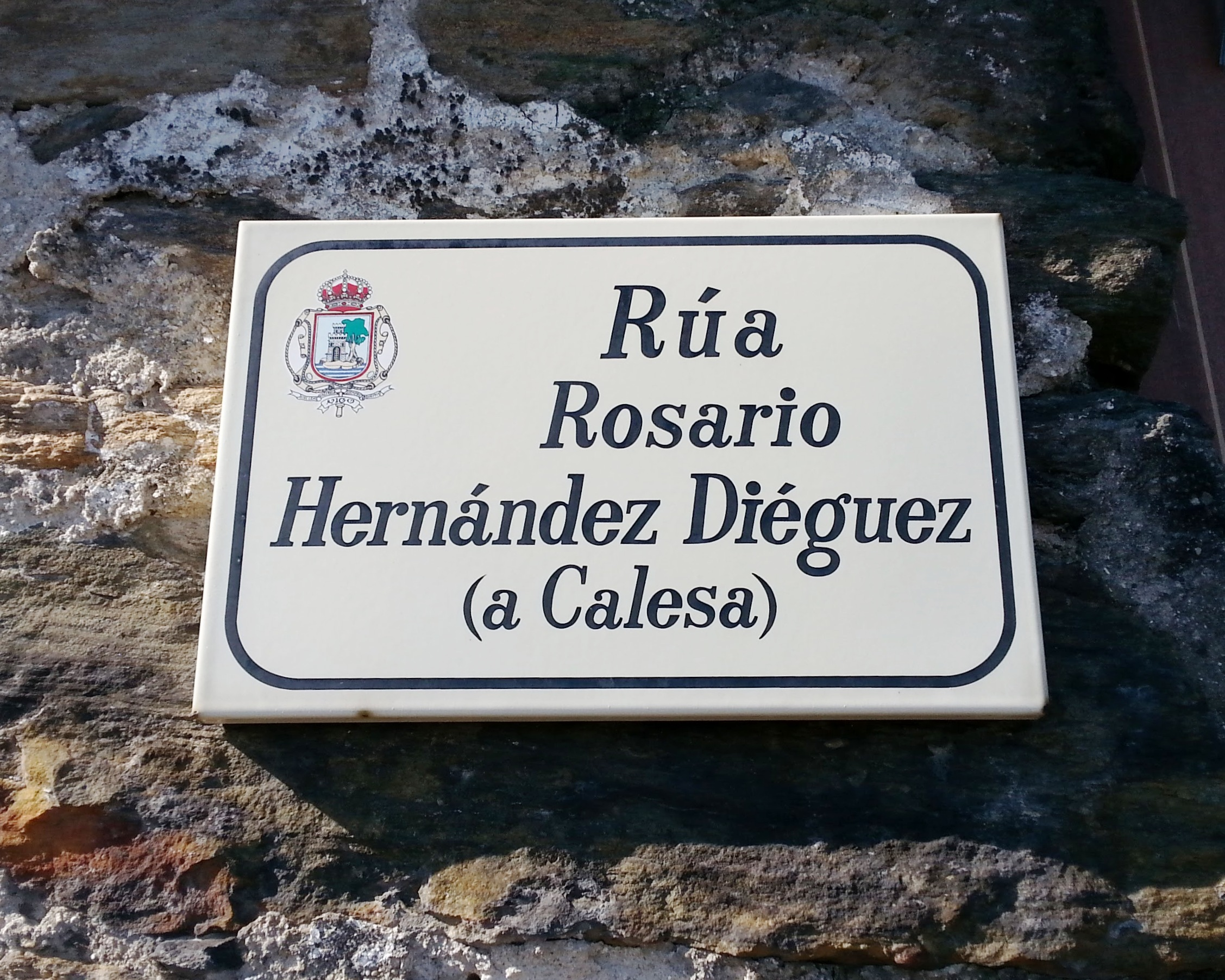
Rosario Hernández Diéguez Street marker in Vigo

A street in Vigo's Coutadas area, between the Os Rosais institute and Travesía de Vigo bears the name Rosario Hernández Diéguez.

In 2021, the story, "Rosario Hernández é un lugar", written by Marcos López Concepción, won the VIII Vigo Histórico Contest, organized by Editoral Elvira.

== See also ==
- Women in the Spanish Socialist Workers' Party in the Spanish Civil War

== Sources ==
- Aurora Marco (2007). Dicionario de mulleres galegas (in Galician). A Nosa Terra. ISBN 9788483411469. OCLC 1026020579.
- Lomba, Antonio Giráldez (1999). "Tres nombres en el recuerdo de Vigo hace sesenta años: "El Comandante", "El Rabioso" y "La Calesa"". Boletín del Instituto de Estudios Vigueses (5): 31–44. ISSN 1135-1810.
