= José Alarcón =

José Alarcón is the name of:

- José Alarcón (cyclist) (born 1988), Venezuelan cyclist
- José Alarcón (politician) (1878–1940), Spanish politician
- José Alarcón Hernández (born 1945), Mexican politician
