= Women in the Spanish Socialist Workers' Party =

Women in the Spanish Socialist Workers' Party were few in number, mainly as a result of the Spanish Socialist Workers' Party (Partido Socialista Obrero Español) (PSOE)'s resistance to women's rights. The party had opposed the women's rights movement, seeing it as a bourgeois endeavor that interfered with their ability to work for labor rights. Despite warnings from prominent women about the problems related to this position, they re-affirmed it several times in the period prior to the Dictatorship of Primo de Rivera.

María Cambrils, a socialist women chosen by the government of Primo de Rivera to serve in 1927's Asamblea Nacional Consultiva, was the most important women's voice of her party in this period. The PSOE engaged important feminists of the day but refused to commit to women's rights and suffrage. The PSOE nominally supported women's suffrage when it was discussed in 1927, after Primo de Rivera gave women the right to vote via Royal Decree.

The Second Republic came into being in 1931, with one of three prominent women, Margarita Nelken y Mansbergen, voted into the inaugural Congreso de Diputados as a representative of the PSOE. Clara Campoamor Rodríguez and Victoria Kent Siano, who had talked to the Socialists in the previous period, won seats for other parties because of their dislike for the Socialists' refusal to support women's rights. Kent and Nelken were aligned on the position that women's suffrage should be delayed, but Kent and Campoamor would dominate the women's suffrage discussion during the writing of the Constitution of the Second Republic. While Nelken may have opposed women's suffrage, her party overwhelmingly voted in support of women's right to vote. Veneranda García Blanco, María Lejarraga and Matilde de la Torre claimed three seats for women of the PSOE in the 1933 elections, the first in which women could participate. The 1936 elections saw Julia Álvarez Resano join Congress for the PSOE.

While the PSOE increasingly believed in a militant approach to dealing with Spain's fascist right, it also actively reinforced traditional gender roles and voiced active opposition to increasing militancy on the part of leftist women. As a consequence, following the Asturian miners' strike of 1934 and the July 1936 start of the Spanish Civil War, Socialist women were generally not involved as fighters on the front lines. Those Socialist women who did want to fight had to join Communist and Anarchist units. The Civil War did not change the PSOE's stance on women. The termination of the war would see Partido Comunista de España became the dominant clandestine political organization in Spain. It would not be until the death of Franco that the PSOE would rise again to become the most prominent leftist party.

== Prelude to the Second Republic (1800–1922) ==
=== Party history ===
Partido Socialista Obrero Español was founded in 1879 as primarily a labor movement organization. Its early pre-1900s membership was almost exclusively male, and they had no interest in gender issues. The first women's group inside PSOE in 1902. It would not be the last. These organizations remained small and subordinate to larger, male dominated socialist groups. The early 1900s, 1910s and 1920s also saw a growth of women into the workforce in industries like nursing and education. These women also joined unions. During the 1920s and early 1930s, women became more involved with socialist movements. This did not translate to participation in the political side, as socialist political organizations were openly hostile to women and not interested in attracting their involvement. When women did create socialist organizations, they were auxiliary organizations to male dominated ones. This was the case for Group of Feminist Socialists of Madrid and Feminist Socialist Groups. This differed from anarchists, with socialist women playing much more passive roles than their anarchist peers. As a consequence, when the Civil War came, few socialist women headed to the front lines.

During this period, the Partido Socialista Obrero Español did not overall want to address women's rights as they saw the movement as bourgeois. They wanted to focus on union organization. This contrasted little from the international socialist movement, which always had problems with feminism and women's rights. The International Socialist Congress, Stuttgart 1907 issued a statement in favor of women's suffrage, but said the movement needed to come from the proletariat. The conditional support was because men believed that women's rights should only come after universal male suffrage. Including women's suffrage more openly would hinder their efforts. The limited inclusion came about as a result First International Conference of Socialist Women which was being held concurrently in the same building.

Socialist woman Lidia Falcón argued that the Socialist men's position would push women away from the party, or would result in only including women who believed in subservience to men. Falcón further argued this position would make feminists into enemies of the party, a truth that would be born out by 1921, which Socialist men decided that to stop their small efforts to promote rights of women as they did not believe it was the time to push for electoral reforms.

Congress of Deputies
Election	Seats	Vote	%	Status	Leader
1907	0 / 404			N/A	Pablo Iglesias Posse
1910	1 / 404	with CRS	–	Opposition	Pablo Iglesias Posse
1914	1 / 408	with CRS	–	Opposition	Pablo Iglesias Posse
1916	1 / 409	with CRS	–	Opposition	Pablo Iglesias Posse
1918	6 / 409	with AI	–	Opposition	Pablo Iglesias Posse
1919	6 / 409	with CRS	–	Opposition	Pablo Iglesias Posse
1920	4 / 409			Opposition	Pablo Iglesias Posse

=== Education ===
Prior to the Second Republic, Partido Socialista Obrero Español (PSOE) recognized that women workers lacked a compensatory educational system and access to educational facilities that was equivalent to their male peers. Yet, despite this, they failed to offer any sort of comprehensive policy solution to this problem and were not willing to advocate strongly on the need to address women's education. The extent of their activism for women's education were demands for integral education for men and women. The Feminine Socialist Group of Madrid met in 1926 to discuss women's rights. Attendees included Victoria Kent and Clara Campoamor.

=== Women's media and writing ===
Margarita Nelken, María Martínez Sierra and Carmen de Burgos were all important pre-Republic writers who influenced feminist thinking inside Spain. La condición social de la mujer en España was the most notable work of Margarita Nelken in this period. Published in 1919, it was revolutionary in Spanish feminism to the extent that it went beyond describing the problems of women to proscribing solutions, and advocating for changes in women's relationships to groups like working and middle-class men, women of different classes, and institutions like the Catholic Church. Writing from a socialist perspective, her feminist works sought to address the conflict between the roles women were expected to maintain in a patriarchal society.

=== Feminism ===
The feminism of Spain in the period between 1900 and 1930 differed from similar movements in the United Kingdom and the United States. It also tended to come from a liberal or leftist perspective. Spanish feminist intellectuals in this period included the militant socialist María Cambrils, who published Feminismo socialista. They also included Clara Campoamor, Virginia González and Carmen de Burgos.

== Dictatorship of Primo de Rivera (1923-1930) ==
The Dictatorship of Primo de Rivera started in 1923 and continued until 1929, with its end resulting in elections being called for June 1931.

During the Dictatorship of Primo de Rivera's had no real national congress until the creation of the Asamblea Nacional Consultiva in 1927. Despite representing various factions across Spain by based on appointment, the body had very little power. A quota system drawn from 18 different regions of Spain, representing different political parties, determined who sat in the body. The last Asamblea Nacional Consultiva group had a representation of only 3% women. Some of the women who sat in the body were wives of nobility, who often did not take their role seriously. Some were drawn from wider society because of their contribution in culture and the arts. Their appointments were a desire to see women become more involved in political life.

PSOE and UGT both had internal divisions over whether to participate in the assembly as it lacked real powers. After much internal debate, both refused to participate. Consequently, the government appointed socialists to the assembly without any party or union oversight. María Cambrils would be one of these socialist women to serve in the 1927 Assembly.

Congress of Deputies
Election	Seats	Vote	%	Status	Leader
1923	7 / 409			Opposition	Pablo Iglesias Posse

=== Women's suffrage ===
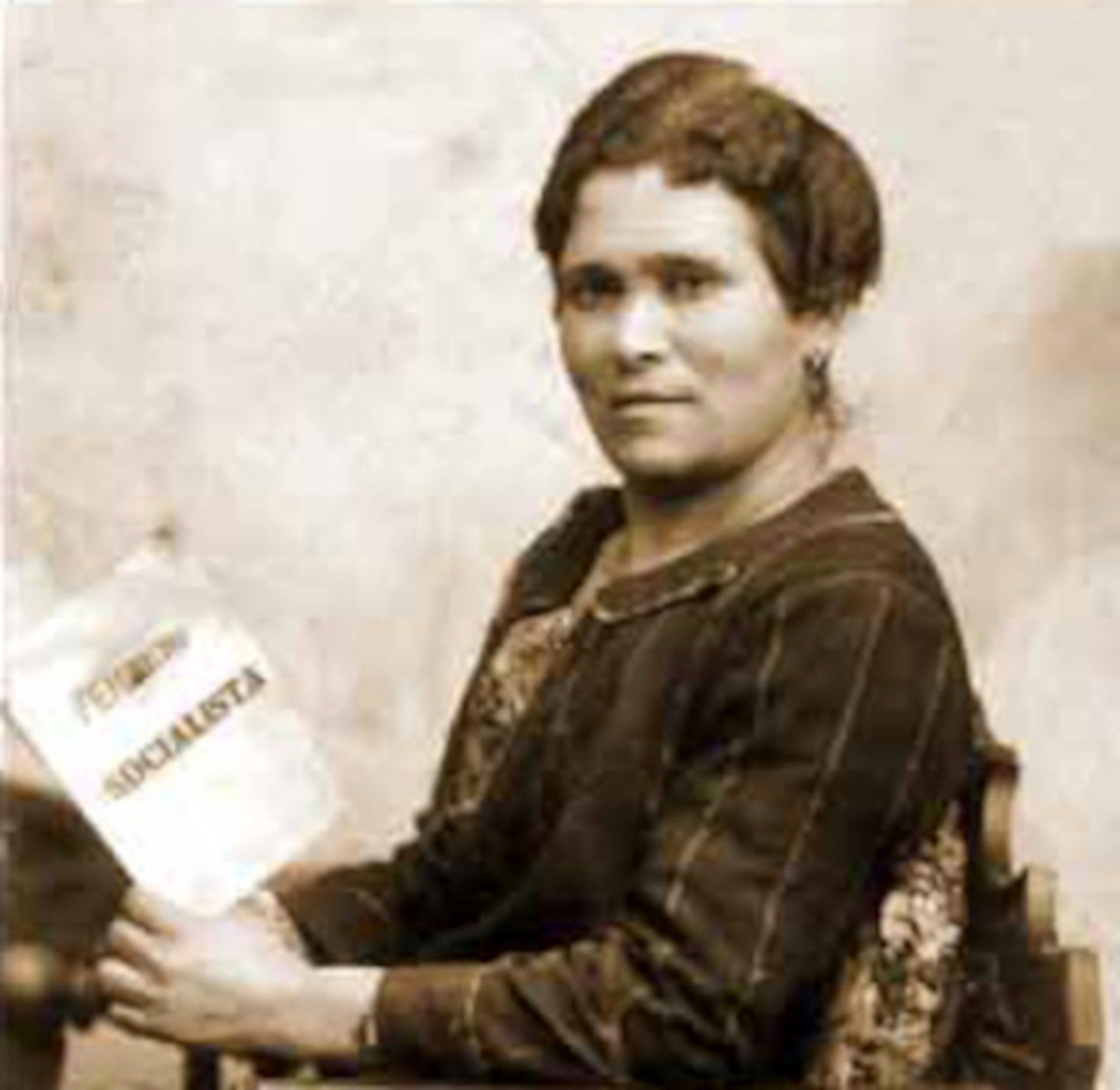
María Cambrils Sendra in one of the only photographs ever taken of her.

The 8 March 1924 Royal Decree's Municipal Statue Article 51 for the first time included an appendix which would allow electoral authorities on a municipal level to list women over the age of 23 who were not controlled by male guardians or the state to be counted. Article 84.3 said unmarried women could vote in municipal elections assuming they were the head of household, over the age of 23, not prostitutes and their status did not change. Changes were made the following month that allowed women who met those some qualifications to run for political office. Consequently, some women took advantage of this political opening, ran for office and won some seats in municipal governments as councilors and mayors where elections were held. This was a surprise move by Primo de Rivera in giving women the right to vote, and was largely viewed as a way of shoring up his electoral base ahead of scheduled elections in the following year. This brief period saw many political parties try to capture the women's vote before the elections were eventually cancelled. Manuel Cordero of El Socialista of wrote in June 1924 of a right wing governing supporting "the feminine vote supposes a revolutionary act and it seems strange that it is a reactionary which who has projected this reform in Spain."

María Cambrils was pleased with women being given the right to vote, but balked at the restrictions placed upon female voters. PSOE's leader Andrés Saborit also supported this claiming that socialism needed to expand how it discussed women as transformational agents in society, and not allow the Catholic Church to monopolize how women were defined inside Spanish culture.

=== Women's rights ===
Agrupación Femenina Socialista de Madrid were active during this period. Trying to engage more broadly, they invited three Madrid based women lawyers, Victoria Kent, Clara Campoamor and Matilde Huici, to speak at Casa del Pueblo to better understand women's demands during the period in 1925 and 1926. By 19 March 1926, Campoamor had withdrawn her assistance to Socialists working on women's issues. Nelken would say in 1922 that she saw both Socialists and the Catholics as offering little hope for women, as neither was capable of seeing the problems faced by women. This issue was one she saw as the central failing of feminism, a position that demonstrated a massive rift in Spanish feminism in the Primo de Rivera period.

== Second Spanish Republic (1931–1937) ==
One of the most important things about the Second Republic for women is it allowed them to formally enter the public sphere en masse. The period also saw a number of rights available to women for the first time. This included the right to vote, divorce and access to higher education.

=== Elections in the Second Republic ===
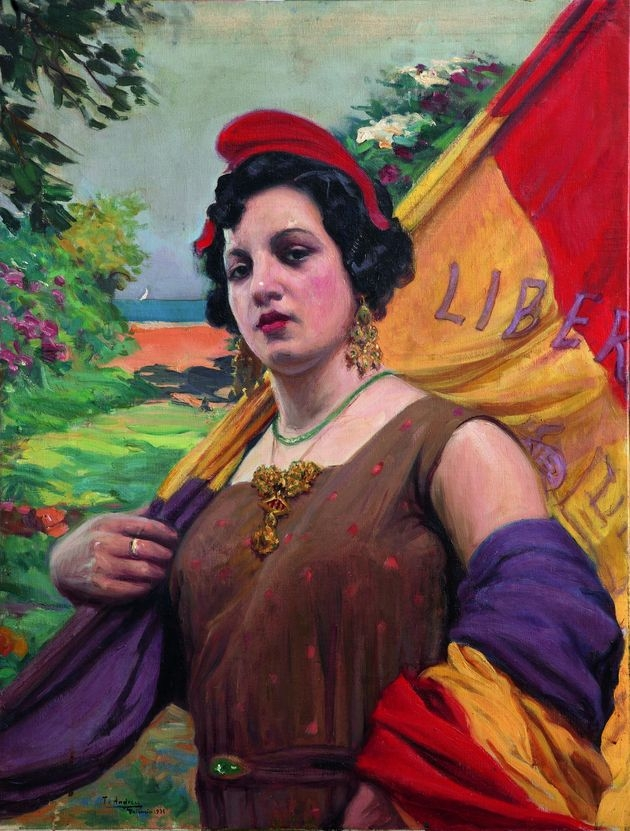
"República Española" (1931) by painter Teodoro Andreu.

The Spanish monarchy ended in 1931. Following this and the end of the Dictatorship of Primo de Rivera, the Second Republic was formed. The Second Republic had three elections before being replaced by the Franco dictatorship. These elections were held in 1931, 1933 and 1936.

Congress of Deputies
Election	Seats	Vote	%	Status	Leader
1931	116 / 470		21.4	Government	Francisco Largo Caballero
1931	116 / 470		21.4	Opposition (from Sep 1933)	Francisco Largo Caballero
1933	59 / 473		19.4	Opposition	Francisco Largo Caballero
1936	99 / 473	with FP	16.4	Opposition	Indalecio Prieto
1936	99 / 473	with FP	16.4	Government (from Sep 1936)	Indalecio Prieto

==== June 1931 Elections ====
Following the failure of the Primo de Rivera dictatorship, Spain set about writing a constitution. The initial draft did not give women the right to vote, though it did give them the right to run for office on 8 May 1931 for the June elections. Socialist woman Lidia Falcón predictions from nearly twenty years earlier would come to fruition. Three women would win seats in Spain's national congress, the Cortes in the 1931 elections, Spain's Cortes were Clara Campoamor Rodríguez, Victoria Kent Siano and Margarita Nelken y Mansbergen. Nelken was the only woman from PSOE to win a seat. Kent and Campoamor, who had been courted early by the party but left because of a lack of action on the issue of suffrage, represented other parties. Campoamor's party, Partido Republicano Radical, was part of a Republican-Socialist coalition.

Following the elections where women were allowed to run for office but not vote, the constitution of the Second Republic was debated. Socialist associated Campoamor, in arguing for women's suffrage before the Cortes on 1 October 1931, that women were not being given the right to vote as a prize, but as a reward for fighting for the Republic. Women protested the war in Morocco. Women in Zaragoza protested the war in Cuba. Women went in larger numbers to protest the closer of Ateneo de Madrid by the government of Primo de Rivera. She also argued that women's inclusion was fundamental to saving the Republic by having a politically engage populace, so that the errors of the French Republic would not be repeated.

Kent, in contrast, received much more support from Spain's right, including Catholics and traditionalists, during this period of constitutional debate as she, alongside Nelken, opposed women's suffrage. Kent and Campoamor became involved in a grand debate over the issue, receiving large amounts of press related to their arguments around women's suffrage.

==== 1933 Elections ====
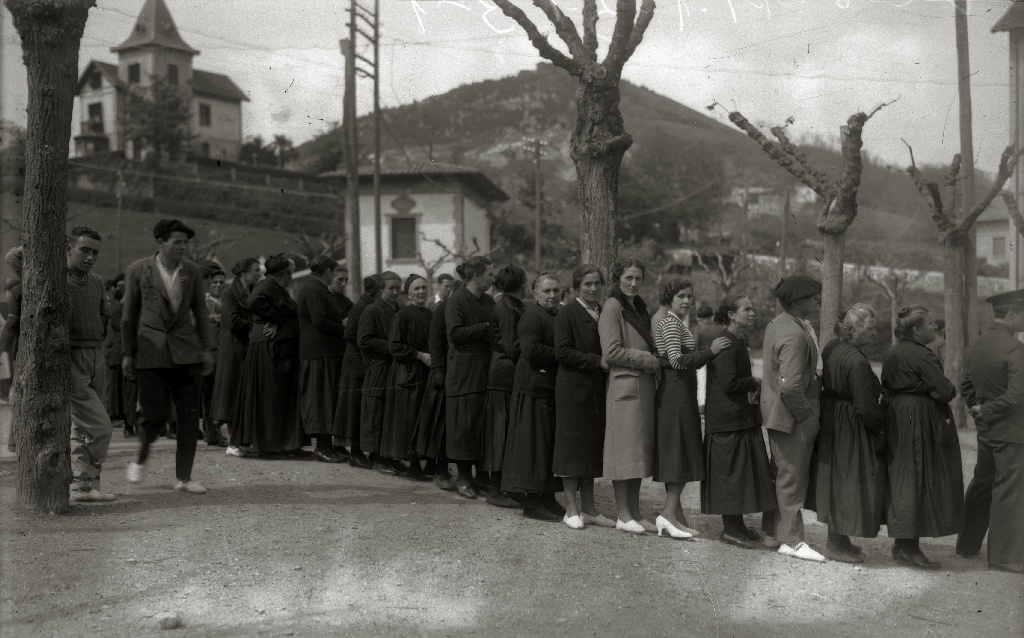
Men and women wait at Escuela Biteri in Hernani to vote in the 1933 elections.

For the first time, for the 1933 elections, women could vote in the national elections. The victory of conservative factions in the 1933 elections was blamed on women, and their voting practices in that election. They were viewed as being controlled by the Church. Only four new women entered Congress, with all but one members of PSOE joining Nelken in the Congreso de Diputados: Veneranda García Blanco, María Lejarraga and Matilde de la Torre. The other, Francisca Bohigas, came from the right wing party, CEDA.

Nelken faced difficulties in the Cortes. Her mother was French and her father was a German Jew. As a consequence, before she was allowed to sit in 1931, Nelken had to go through special bureaucratic procedures to insure she was a naturalized Spanish citizen. Her political interests were looked down upon by her male peers, including Prime Minister Manuel Azaña. Her feminist beliefs worried and threatened her male colleagues in the Cortes. Despite this, she was reelected in 1933, and found herself subject to constant attacks in the media as she proved a constant irritant to male party members who sometimes resorted to racist attacks in the Cortes to shut her down. Still, she persevered, winning election 1931, 1933 and 1936. Disillusionment with the party led her to change membership to the Communist Party in 1937.

==== February 1936 elections ====
The February 1936 elections saw the return of a leftist government. Together, the various left wing groups formed the Popular Front. They replaced a repressive right leaning government that had been in power for the two previous years.

The Popular Front won elections in February 1936 on a progressive platform, promising major reforms to government. In response, even as the left began reform plans to undo conservative efforts in the previous government, the military began planning how to overthrow the new government. Popular Front, in contrast, refused to arm its own supporters out of fear they would then use them against the Government.

The February 1936 elections saw Julia Alvarez Resano enter parliament as a member of PSOE. She came to the Cortes having previously served as a defense lawyer for the Spanish Federation of Land Workers. Matilde de la Torre won election again in 1936.

=== Feminism ===
The formational period for the Second Republic was dominated by a contest of wills between Partido Republicano Radical Socialista (PRRS) aligned Victoria Kent and Partido Republicano Radical aligned Clara Campoamor. They fiercely contested the topic of women's suffrage. PSOE's Margarita Nelken supported Kent's position that women were not ready to vote.

==== Female Republican Union ====
Clara Campoamor created the Female Republican Union (Spanish: Unión Republicana de Mujeres) during the early part of the Second Republic. Female Republican Union had the sole purpose of advocating for women's suffrage. It was often polemetic in its opposition to Kent's group Foundation for Women, and its opposition to women's suffrage.

==== Foundation for Women ====
Victoria Kent and Margarita Nelken founded the Foundation for Women (Spanish: Asociación Nacional de Mujeres Española) in 1918. Foundation for Women was a radical socialist organization at its inception, and aligned themselves with PSOE. The organization opposed women's suffrage, even as its founders sat in Spain's Cortes. The belief was if women were given the right to vote, most women would vote as their husbands and the Catholic Church told them to. This would fundamentally damage the secular nature of the Second Republic, by bringing in a democratically elected right wing government.

=== Women's suffrage ===
One of the first laws implemented allowed women to vote and to run for political office. This happened with Article 36 of the Constitution of the Second Republic, and came into force on 1 October 1931. The first women to win seats in Spain's Cortes were Clara Campoamor Rodríguez, Victoria Kent Siano and PSOE aligned Margarita Nelken y Mansbergen. They won these seats in June 1931, several months before women were given the right to vote. Nelken and Kent had both opposed giving women's suffrage, arguing most women would vote for conservatives because of the influence of their husbands and the clergy, thus undermining the Spanish Republic. Campoamor, in contrast, was a strong advocate of women's suffrage. Despite Nelken's opposition to women's suffrage, PSOE members overwhelming supported the issue when it came up for a vote. The vote was 161 in favor, and 131 against. 83 of the 115 PSOE deputies supported the motion.

=== Party governance ===
In general, PSOE began espousing a more militant approach to combating right wing actors inside Spain, continuing this thinking as the history of the Second Republic chugged along in the face of increasing numbers of labor conflicts and male leadership quarrels. Nelken was the political leader of the PSOE's women's wing. Her feminist beliefs worried and threatened her male colleagues in the Cortes. Despite this, Nelken was the only woman during the Second Republic to win three elections for the Socialists to serve in the Cortes. Her election wins came in 1931, 1933 and 1936. Disillusionment with the party led her to change membership to the Communist Party in 1937.

During the immediate pre-Civil War period, Campoamor tried to rejoin the Spanish socialists but was repeatedly rejected. Her support of universal suffrage, feminist goals and divorce had made her an anathema to the male dominated party leadership. Eventually, in 1938, she went into exile in Argentina.

=== October Revolution of 1934 ===
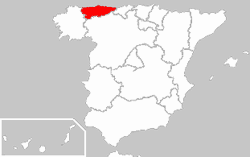
Location of Asturias, Spain.

Women played roles behind the scenes in one of the first major conflicts of the Second Republic, when workers' militias seized control of the mines in Asturias. Originally planned as a nationwide strike, the workers collective action only really took place in Asturias. Some women were involved in propaganda and others in assisting the miners. After the government quelled the insurrection by bringing in Moroccan legionaries, some 30,000 people found themselves in prison and another 1,000 were put into graves. A large number of those put into prison were women. Women also played an advocacy role in trying to see their husbands and male relatives released.

More recently, academics have debated if the Asturian miners's strike represented the real start of the Spanish Civil War. Imagery from the conflict was subsequently used by both sides for propaganda to further their own agenda, particularly inside PSOE who saw it the situation as a call for political unity on the left if they were to have any hope of countering the rise of fascism in Spain. PSOE consequently used a lot of gendered imagery to sell people on their ideas. Propaganda used featuring the events in October 1934 featured women in gender conforming ways that did not challenge their roles as feminine. This was done by male leadership with the intention of counteracting the image of strong women political leaders, who unnerved many on the right. Right wing propaganda at the time featured women as vicious killers, who defied gender norms to eliminate the idea of Spanish motherhood.

=== Start of the Civil War ===
Location of Melilla, where Nationalist forces started their campaign in 1936.

On 17 July 1936, the Unión Militar Española launched a coup d'état in North Africa and Spain. They believed they would have an easy victory. They failed to predict the people's attachment to the Second Republic. With the Republic largely maintaining control over its Navy, Franco and others in the military successfully convinced Adolf Hitler to provide transport for Spanish troops from North Africa to the Iberian peninsula. These actions led to a divided Spain, and the protracted events of the Spanish Civil War. It would not officially end until 1 April 1939.

Franco's initial coalition included monarchists, conservative Republicans, Falange Española members, Carlist traditionalist, Roman Catholic clergy and the Spanish army. They had support from fascist Italy and Nazi Germany. The Republican side included Socialists, Communists, and various other left wing actors.

Great Britain, France, Germany, Italy and the Soviet Union signed the Non-Intervention Treaty in August 1936, promising not to provide material support for the war to any of the parties, even as Germany and Italy were already and continued to provide support to Spain's fascists.

== Spanish Civil War (1936–1939) ==
PSOE continued to ignore the unique problems of women during the Civil War. When women were interested in joining the party, they found themselves locked out of leadership positions. PSOE also refused to send women to the front, perpetuating the sexist belief that a woman could best serve the war effort by staying at home.

María Lacrampe had joined UGT in 1932 and become involved with the 1934 Asturian Revolution. In November 1937, she became the secretary of the Asociación Socialista de Madrid. As part of her work, she assisted in bringing Spanish Republican children into exile in Belgium. At the conclusion of the war, she unsuccessfully tried to escape via boat by claiming she was a French citizen. By June 1939, she was in the Las Ventas Prison in Madrid, where she used her time to work as a nurse assisting children of other female prisoners. She would also be present right before many women were put to death, with many of these women offering her their last testimonies.

UGT and PSOE were both banned by Franco in 1938.

=== Women in combat ===
Partido Socialista Obrero Español was one of the only major actors on the left to immediately reject the idea of women participating in combat. The idea was too radical for them, and they believed women should serve as heroes at home, providing support to civilian populations well behind the front lines. Women who were members of PSOE who found their way to combat did so by joining communist and socialist youth groups. One of the few publicly socialist identified militia women in this period was María Elisa García, who served as a miliciana with the Popular Militias as a member Asturias Battalion Somoza company.

== Francoist Spain (1938–1973) ==
Partido Comunista de España became the dominant clandestine political organization in Spain following the end of the Civil War. It would retain this position until the death of Franco saw PSOE replace it.
