= María Cambrils =

Spanish writer and feminist (1878–1939)

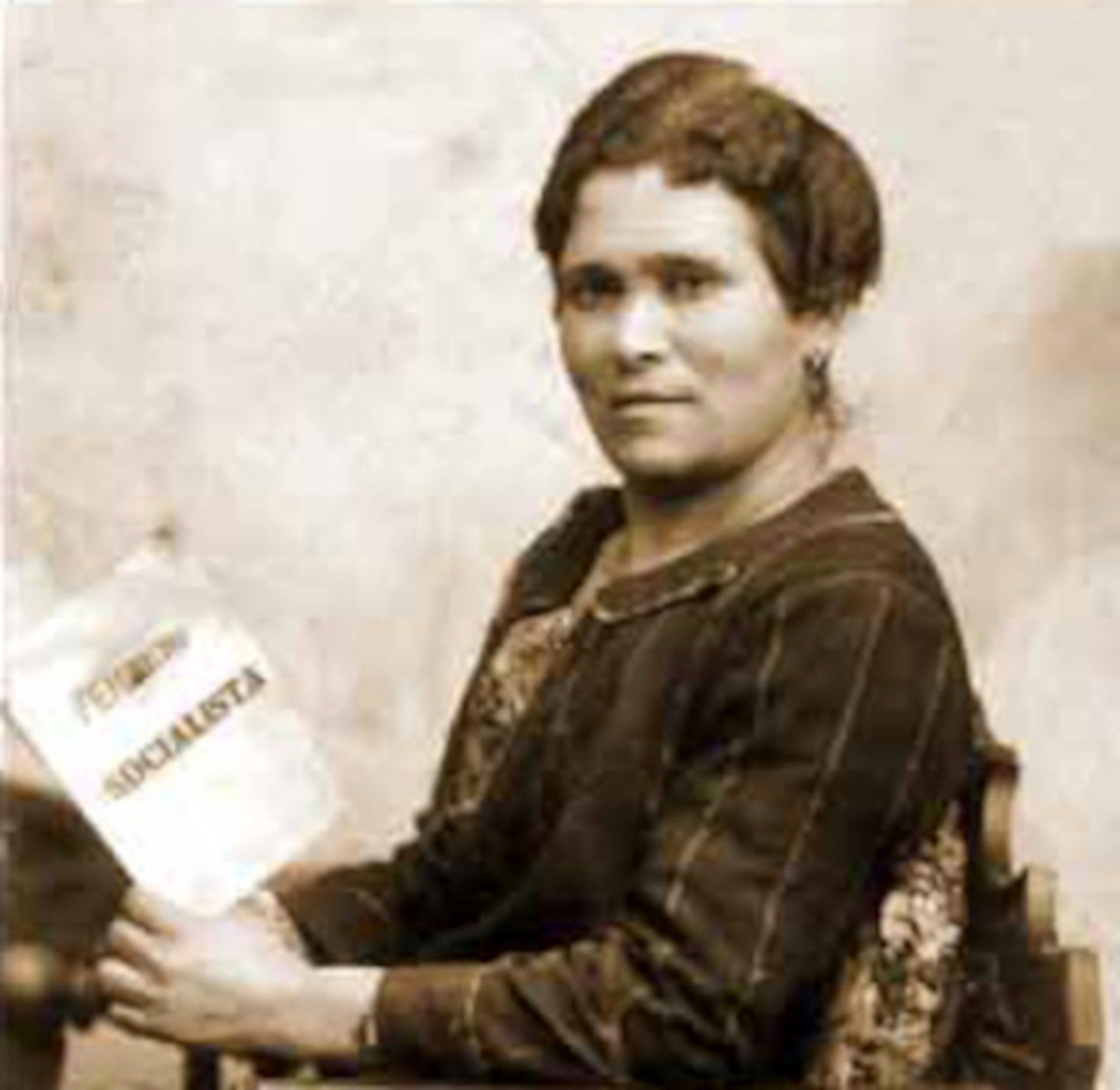
- Born: María Cambrils Sendra; 1878; Valencia, Spain
- Died: 22 December 1939 (aged 61); Pego, Spain
- Occupation: Writer
- Political party: Spanish Socialist Workers' Party
- Spouse: José Martínez Dols
- Partner: José Alarcón Herrero

María Cambrils Sendra (1878 – 22 December 1939) was a Spanish writer and feminist. She was self-taught and became part of the working class intellectual elite as a writer and lecturer. She published numerous articles in the workers' press, especially El Socialista. She is the author of the 1925 book Feminismo socialista, a reference on women's rights and feminist and socialist action.

== Biography ==
María Cambrils was the daughter of a laborer and an illiterate mother who emigrated from Pego, Alicante to Valencia, where she lived most of her life. She probably married very young, to José Martínez Dols. Upon his death, the investigation into her life indicated that she lived in an unidentified convent and may even have been a nun for a time after becoming a widow. In her writings she recalls her "conventual life" and demonstrates the handling of religious texts with solvency, however precise data have not been located. No details are known of how the change in her life occurred when, in the 1910s, she met her companion José Alarcón Herrero, a former anarchist leader born in Jumilla and, like her, a member of the Spanish Socialist Workers' Party (PSOE).

In her writings, Cambrils explains that it was readings and talks with a neighbor in Valencia that opened her eyes to the doctrine of "proletarian redemption" and the role women should play in it.

Between 1924 and 1933 she wrote hundreds of articles in the workers' press, mainly in El Socialista, where she was practically the only woman who regularly contributed, publishing her articles together with the endorsements of the founder Pablo Iglesias, Julián Besteiro, Andrés Saborit, Indalecio Prieto, and Largo Caballero.

She also wrote for El Pueblo, El Obrero de Elche, Revista Popular, El Obrero Balear, El Popular, Mundo Obrero, and La Voz del Trabajo.

Often her texts revolved around the situation of women and what she viewed as the need for feminist action, also within her party, whose militants she often reproached for not being active enough for the liberation of their comrades.

In 1925 she published the book Feminismo socialista in Valencia, prefaced by Clara Campoamor, a text with great repercussions that historians consider fundamental in the evolution of leftist feminism, and one of the first works published in Castilian on the intimate relationship between both concepts. It deals with a class of feminism involved with the era of Spain in the first third of the 20th century. It was a modest edition, paid for by Cambrils herself, dedicated to Pablo Iglesias, whom she referred to as "venerable teacher", and whose proceeds went to the press of El Socialista. "Every man who acquires and reads this book should facilitate its reading to the women of his family and his friends, because with this he will contribute to the dissemination of the principles that should be known to women for the sake of citizens' freedoms," the introduction noted.

The book was reissued in 1992 by the Clara Campoamor Association of Bilbao.

In 1933, for reasons of health, she moved with José Alarcón to Pego, where she was councilor and general secretary of the Socialist Association, director of the UGT, and member of the casa del pueblo administration board from 1933 to 1939. At the end of the Civil War, and despite the fact that it was recognized that no crimes of blood had been attributed to him, Alarcón was shot in Alicante along with Aquilino Barrachina and other socialists of Pego on 11 April 1940. María Cambrils, attended by her nieces during an illness while Alarcón was in jail, died on 22 December 1939. She was buried in a grave without a name or a tombstone.

== A story overlooked for years ==
Knowledge of the biographical aspects of Maria Cambrils is recent. Her only known photograph was published for the first time in 2004 by Elvira Cambrils. According to the journalist Rosa Solbes, in some environments it was even thought that María Cambrils was the pseudonym of a man until testimonies of survivors were obtained that offered specific information on the author, such as those of veteran CNT journalist Leonardo Herández and Juan Bautista Pons, assault guard during the Second Republic.

In April 2015, the University of Valencia published a monograph entitled María Cambrils, el despertar del feminismo socialista (María Cambrils: The Awaking of Socialist Feminism), which includes her biography, her book Feminismo Socialista, and more than 100 articles published between 1924 and 1933 in El Socialista, El Obrero Balear, El Pueblo, and Revista Popular. The work was carried out by journalist Rosa Solbes, historian Ana Aguado, and archivist Joan Manuel Almela, with a prologue by Carmen Alborch.

== Socialist feminism ==
María Cambrils represented a key turning point in the formulation of egalitarian and feminist approaches within the socialism of the first third of the 20th century in Spain, according to researchers from the University of Valencia, who in 2015 released the book María Cambrils, el despertar del feminismo socialista.

Inspired by August Bebel, Cambrils wrote: "Women workers cannot forget that the only political force of moral solvency frankly defending feminism is socialism," and defined her work as "a plea against injustice, oppression, indissoluble marriage, and violence with the affections of the heart."

In her texts, she defends the indispensable link between socialism and feminism and questions the role of the church as an institution that, she believes, retains nothing of the compassionate spirit of the defender of the weakest. She discusses women's suffrage, teaching, motherhood, paternity research, agricultural feudalism, antifeminism in disguise, divorce, advances and problems of women in other parts of the world, and female organization. She also confronts worker misogyny, reproaches many of her colleagues for not having been concerned about equality and the education of their partners and daughters, and denounces those that do not fight for suffrage. "Modern women," she writes, "aspire to share in the law, not to impose themselves, as the enemies of feminism capriciously maintain: we do not want pity but justice."

== Tributes ==
At the beginning of the Spanish transition in 1976, a group of socialist economists in Valencia, which included Ernest Lluch and Dolors Bramon, adopted the name María Cambrils. They wrote several articles in the weekly Dos y Dos about women in the economic context of the time and the necessary simultaneity of feminism and socialism.

In Bilbao, the Euskadi Information, Children's, Youth, and Women's Center is named after her.

The exhibition 100 mujeres españolas que abrieron el camino a la igualdad (100 Spanish Women Who Opened the Way to Equality) organized by the Women's Institute of Spain dedicated a reference to her, though it contained very little information beyond the cover of her book.

In January 2016, the Council for Women and Equality of the City Council of Valencia included the name of María Cambrils in the list of those to incorporate into the streets of the city, recovering the history of women.

== Works ==
- Feminismo Socialista (1925), Valencia, Tipografía Las Artes
- El Socialista Colaboraciones y artículos (1925–26)
