= José Alarcón (politician) =

Spanish politician (1878–1940)

José Alarcón Herrero (1878 – 11 March 1940) was a Spanish Socialist Workers' Party politician. He was a supporter of the Republican faction during the Spanish Civil War. After the victory of the Nationalists, he was executed by the Francoist State.

He was the romantic partner of socialist feminist writer María Cambrils.
