= Casa del pueblo =

Type of local branch office in Spain

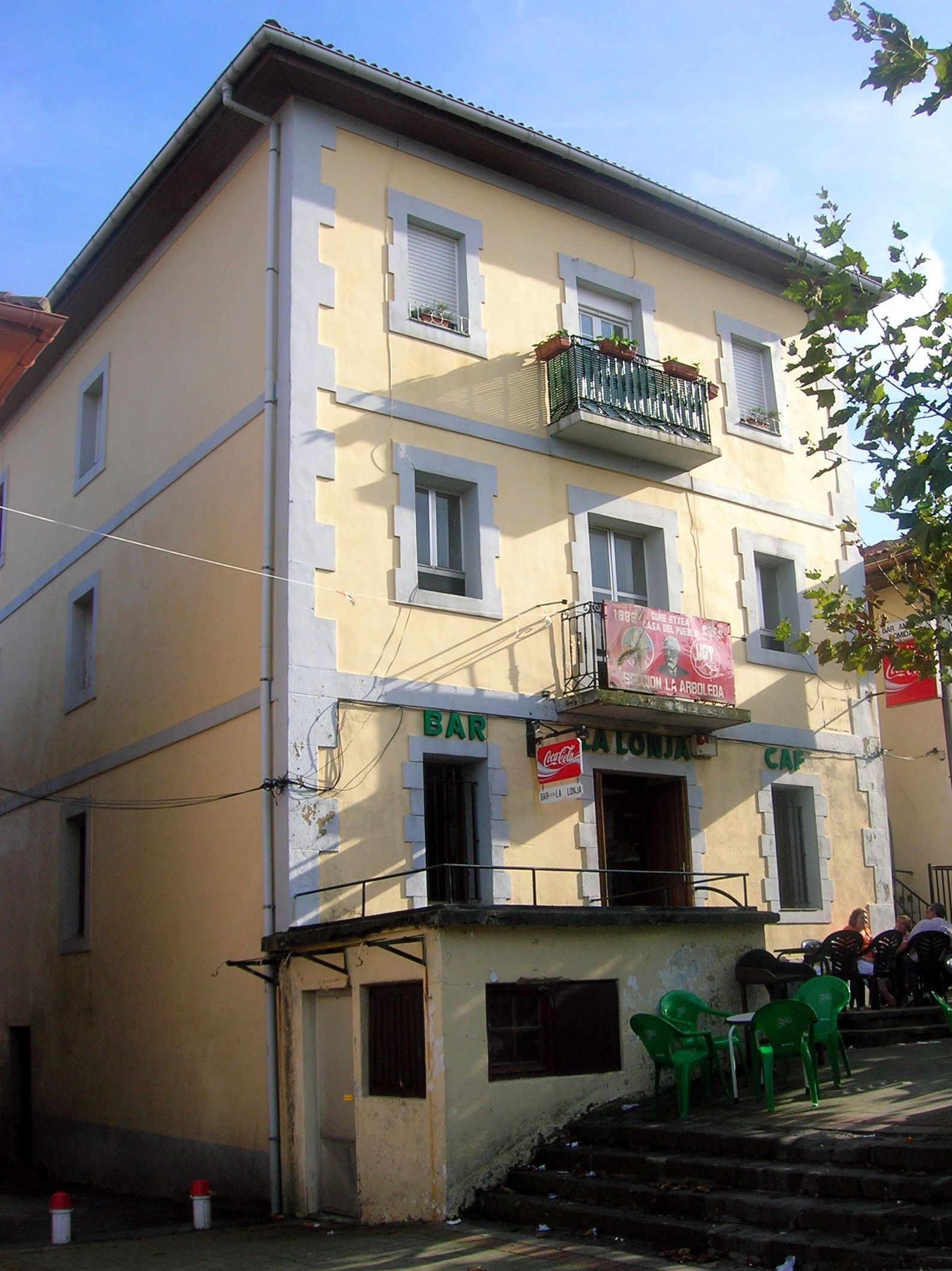
Casa del Pueblo in La Arboleda-Zugaztieta, Trápaga-Trapagaran, Biscay, Spain. The local branch was founded in 1888.

In Spain, a Casa del Pueblo (Spanish: House of the People) refers to a typical local branch office of both the PSOE and the Unión General de Trabajadores. Historically, the term has been used to describe clearing houses of information for Spanish employees and workers.

A large number of societies and labor organizations were often housed in casas del pueblo.

== Madrid ==
The first casa del pueblo was founded by Pablo Iglesias in 1908 in Madrid; the office was created in a former ducal palace on Calle del Piamonte. Inside, Arturo Barea records offices, a hall for cinema, theater and rallies, a library and the site of the first health insurance managed by the workers of Madrid, the Mutualidad, which protects the worker and his family at a time without Social Security and has a clinic that provides free medicine to the affiliate.

As of 1916, Madrid's casa del Pueblo was the headquarters of the Spanish Socialists.

The example of the Casa del Pueblo in Madrid was rife throughout Spain, particularly in the industrial areas of Asturias and the Basque Country. The workers are taught to read and write, but can also get more advanced education befitting a people's university.

Currently, the term has disappeared from most of the PSOE headquarters, except in the Basque country where it is preserved.

The name is also used for some cultural sites managed by anarchists and the union Confederación Nacional del Trabajo (CNT-AIT), although in these cases the general term was Ateneo libertario. The casa del pueblo in Alcoy is the cultural home of UCE (Communist Unification of Spain).

== See also ==
- People's House
