= Women on the Republican side of the Spanish Civil War =

Women who were part of the Republican faction in the Spanish Civil War were involved both on the home front and on the battlefield.

The birth of the Second Spanish Republic in 1931 saw the rights of women expand, including the granting of the right to vote. It represented a changing cultural and political landscape in which women's political organizations could flourish for the first time. It failed to empower women completely, as they were often locked out of governance roles and positions in political organizations.

The Spanish Civil War started in July 1936, and would pit the Nationalist forces of the right against the Republican forces of the Popular Front government. On the Republican side, women were known to mobilize in support by leaving the home and engaging in activities less associated with the domestic sphere. It was in this climate that a number of important women's organizations were created or flourished. In some cases, it led to women gaining leadership of a kind they had not achieved before, such as inside militias. It did not inspire unification among women inside the Popular Front itself as many divisions existed, eventually leading to leftist-organized internal purges with Popular Front parties turning on each other.

The end of the war and the start of the Francoism saw a return for women to the traditional gender roles of Catholic Spain. It saw ostracization and imprisonment of women who fought for the Republican side. It saw many women sent to overcrowded prisons, where the children born there faced high rates of death. Many other women went into exile. The legacy of Republican women has largely been ignored. This stems from sexism, propaganda that said they were deviants, and a lack of primary sources.

== Prelude to the Second Republic (1800–1922) ==
=== Women's rights ===
Spanish women did not hold the same status as citizens as men from 1800 to 1931. Single Spanish women enjoyed a few more legal rights than their married peers once they reached the age of 23. At that point, unmarried women could sign contracts and run businesses on their own behalf. Married women needed the approval of or involvement of their husbands to do things like change their address, accept an inheritance, and own property or a business. All women in this period were denied the right to vote or run for political office. While it was legal for men to commit adultery so long as it was not "scandalous", all forms of adultery were illegal for women and they could be imprisoned for two to six years for the offense. Divorce was also banned. Catholicism played a huge role in Spanish political thinking in nineteenth and early twentieth century Spain. The religion supported strict gender roles, which led to the repression of Spanish women and fostered ingrained sexism across the whole of Spanish society. Society, through the Catholic Church, dictated that the role of women was to marry, and bear children. They were to be invisible in society outside the domestic sphere. Violations of these norms was often met with violence. Husbands could deny women the ability to leave their homes. Families could force women into marriage against their will. Husbands could put their wives into prison for disobeying them or insulting them.

National Association of Spanish Women (ANME) was founded in 1918. Headed by María Espinosa, it lobbied for women's right to vote. The Female Republican Union was created by Campoamor to advocate for women's suffrage in Spain. Campoamor, María Lejárraga and Regina García founded the Foundation for Women to advocate for women's legal equality in Spain during the Second Republic.

Starting in the 1920s, the efforts of women to get the right to vote intensified as part of a broader western movement that saw women demanding equal rights.

=== Feminists ===
During the 1800s, the most important women advocating for women's rights in Spain were Teresa Claramunt and Teresa Mañe, with both women coming from the anarchist movement. They built on ideas that were being developed by the North American feminists, Voltairine de Cleyre and Emma Goldman. Spanish women were among the first to inject anarchism into feminist thinking.

The feminism of Spain in the period between 1900 and 1930 differed from similar movements in the United Kingdom and the United States. It also tended to come from a liberal or leftist perspective. Spanish feminist intellectuals in this period included the militant socialist María Cambrils, who published Feminismo socialista. They also included Clara Campoamor, Virginia González and Carmen de Burgos. One of the more notable pre-Republic feminists was lawyer and prison reformer Concepción Arenal. She believed it was important for women to strive for more in life beyond the confines of her home.

The movement began to take traction in 1915, when ANME first started to work together to address women's needs. ANME's early feminism was characterized by its right wing leanings, as a result of it being associated with Spain's upper classes.

The Seccion Varia de Trabajadoras anarco-colectivistas de Sabadell was founded by Claramunt and other like minded women in 1884. Working with Ateneo Obreros, the organizations sought to emancipate both men and women through education. It had folded sometime by late 1885.

Agrupación de Trabajadores was created as a labor organization in 1891 by Claramunt to support her feminist ideals, and soon organized public meetings. The organization argued that women were being doubly punished by society, as women were expected to work outside the home to provide for the family while at the same time to meet all the domestic needs of the households. The organization was never particularly successful in its goals as many women in the workforce did not see a need for representation by a union.

Belén Ságarra has been involved with the Sociedad Autónoma de Mujeres de Barcelona, an organization founded around 1891. She and Claramunt sought to create Associación Librepensadora de Mujeres. Ságarra was stopped from doing so after being arrested in 1896 for being anti-Christian and promoting free-thinking.

=== Employment and labor organizations ===
While 17% of women worked in 1877, most were peasants who were involved in agriculture. Despite industrialization in Spain and because of the industrialization of agricultural in the 1900s, restrictive gender norms meant only 9% of women were employed by 1930. This represented a drop of 12% of all women and 0.5 million total women in the workforce from 1877 to 1930. Prostitution was legal in pre-Second Republic Spain, and poor, white women had to fear being trafficked as slaved. By the 1900s, women could and did sometimes work in factory sweatshops, alongside young male workers. Most women seeking employment outside their homes worked in the homes of the more affluent in the country. These jobs paid so little that female workers often struggled to earn enough to feed themselves. When women were involved in factory work in this period, they were often paid half the wage of their male counterparts.

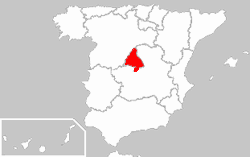
Location of Madrid in Spain

Despite the lack of presence in the workforce, women did engage in labor protests in specific industries where they were over represented. This included labor action in Madrid in 1830, where there was five days of rioting over wage reductions and unsafe working conditions by 3,000 female tobacco workers. Female tobacco workers were also the first to unionize, creating their first union in 1918. The union was successful in doubling wages for its workers in 1914 and 1920. The union also successfully had workers wages tripled in 1930. Their labor actions continued into the Second Republic period. Despite their involvement in labor organizing in tobacco, women were otherwise largely absent from late nineteenth century labor movements in Spain.

Despite the limited opportunities for women, some did manage to get highly ranked government positions, though these were few and far between.

=== Political activity ===
The nineteenth century saw for the first time the emergence of a true middle class in Spain. This precipitated internal questioning among the Spanish elite about social inequalities that had existed in Spain since the founding of the modern Spanish state when Isabella of Castille married Ferdinand of Aragon, solidifying Spanish territory under one government. These discussions would see the creation of the First Spanish Republic from 1873 to 1874.

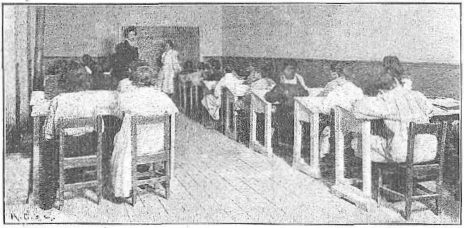
A mathematics class organized by Institución Libre de Enseñanza in 1903 with a female teacher

The Institución Libre de Enseñza (ILE) was founded by persecuted Spanish intellectuals, and catered to freethinkers in educational facilities removed from government control. The ILE would be important in forming ideologies that would lead to the creation of the Second Spanish Republic. The ILE was revolutionary in Spain in that it was one of the first organizations to recognize the potential of women, though this potential was still viewed as limited. To this end, ILE member Fernando de Castro, then dead of the Universidad de Madrid, created the "Sunday Lectures for the Education of Women" in 1868.

==== Direct women's involvement ====
Because women in the pre-Republican period were largely confined to domestic spheres, their political activity tended to be centered around issues related to consumer activities. Women protested and rioted in this period over goods and services shortages, high rents and high prices of consumer goods. Their purpose in going so was to encourage the government to change its practices to address these issues.

When political activity occurred by women in the pre-Republican period, it was often spontaneous. They were also often ignored by left-wing male political leaders. Despite this, these riots and protests represented increasing political awareness among women of their need to be more active in social and political spheres to enact change to improve their lives.

Women's protests against high food prices spread across Spain in both 1913 and 1918. In Barcelona, in 1918, women used the slogan: 'In the name of humanity, all women take to the streets!'. They organised repeated demonstrations and attacked shops, warehouses, government offices and music halls. Women also staged food riots during the Spanish Civil War.

==== Labor organizations ====
===== Confederación Nacional del Trabajo =====
The 1918 Congress of CNT demonstrated the gender based tensions among anarchists in Spain. Men tried to use the Congress to assert their own power over women in both the public and private sphere. This was in large part because male anarchists did not want to see a power dynamic change which would result in a diminishment of their own status.

==== Communists ====
===== Communist Party =====
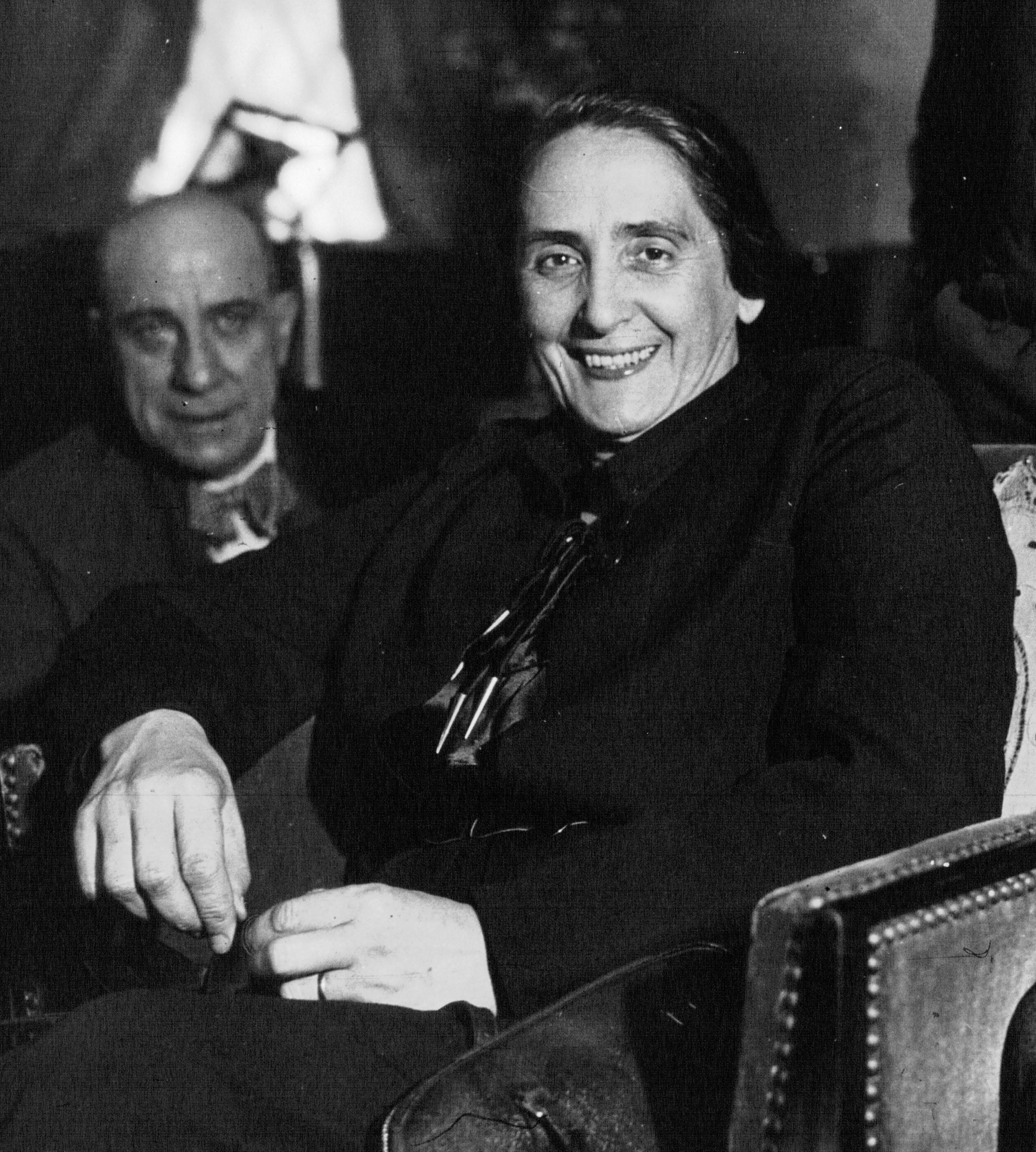
Spanish political leader Dolores Ibárruri in 1936

Dolores Ibárruri was one of the few women active in leadership in the Communist Party of Spain. Joining during the 1920s, she found herself elected to the Central Committee in 1930. Two years later, she was the head of its Women's Commission.

==== Socialists ====
===== Partido Socialista Obrero Español =====
PSOE was founded in 1879 as primarily a labor movement organization. Its early pre-1900s membership was almost exclusively male, and they had no interest in gender issues. The first women's group inside PSOE in 1902. It would not be the last. These organizations remained small and subordinate to larger, male dominated socialist groups. The early 1900s, 1910s and 1920s also saw a growth of women into the workforce in industries like nursing and education. These women also joined unions. During the 1920s and early 1930s, women became more involved with socialist movements. This did not translate to participation in the political side, as socialist political organizations were openly hostile to women and not interested in attracting their involvement. When women did create socialist organizations, they were auxiliary organizations to male dominated ones. This was the case for Group of Feminist Socialists of Madrid and Feminist Socialist Groups. This differed from anarchists, with socialist women playing much more passive roles than their anarchist peers. As a consequence, when the Civil War came, few socialist women headed to the front lines.

Prior to the Second Republic, Partido Socialista Obrero Español (PSOE) recognized that women workers lacked a compensatory educational system and access to educational facilities that was equivalent to their male peers. Yet, despite this, they failed to offer any sort of comprehensive policy solution to this problem and were not willing to advocate strongly on the need to address women's education. The extent of their activism for women's education were demands for integral education for men and women. The Feminine Socialist Group of Madrid met in 1926 to discuss women's rights. Attendees included Victoria Kent and Clara Campoamor.

During this period, the Partido Socialista Obrero Español (PSOE) did not overall want to address women's rights as they saw the movement as bourgeois. They wanted to focus on union organization. This contrasted little from the international socialist movement, which always had problems with feminism and women's rights. The International Socialist Congress, Stuttgart 1907 issued a statement in favor of women's suffrage, but said the movement needed to come from the proletariat. The conditional support was because men believed that women's rights should only come after universal male suffrage. Including women's suffrage more openly would hinder their efforts. The limited inclusion came about as a result First International Conference of Socialist Women which was being held concurrently in the same building.

Socialist woman Lidia Falcón argued that the Socialist men's position would push women away from the party, or would result in only including women who believed in subservience to men. Falcón further argued this position would make feminists into enemies of the party, a truth that would be born out by 1921, which Socialist men decided that to stop their small efforts to promote rights of women as they did not believe it was the time to push for electoral reforms.

=== Women's media and writing ===
Margarita Nelken, María Martínez Sierra and Carmen de Burgos were all important pre-Republic writers who influenced feminist thinking inside Spain.

Carmen de Burgos was not primarily known for her feminist writings in the pre-Republican period. Instead, she was known as a writing of popular novellas. Despite that, her La mujer moderna y sus derechos in 1927 was one of the most important feminist works of its time. As feminist, she started her writing career in the early 1920s as a relative moderate feminist. Having written for various liberal and progressive newspapers from the 1900s to 1920s, it was only as time passed during the latter part of the decade that she became more radical and part of the First Wave Feminism. As a feminist, she advocated reforms to Spain's legal system, including legalizing divorce and women's suffrage.

María Martínez Sierra wrote under the name Gregorio Martínez Sierra, publishing a series of four essays using her husband's name during the period from 19116 to 1932. These include Cartas a las mujeres de España, Feminismo, femindidad, españolismo, La mujer moderna, and Nuevas cartas a las mujeres de España. Not until the death of her husband in 1947 did María de la O Lejárraga claim authorship of these writings and admit to intentionally trying to use a masculine voice to try add credibility to them. The feminism she espoused in these letters were a paradox given the impression of male authorship. Her wider body of feminist work also sat outside the feminism being developed by Anglo women in North America and Great Britain, but was well received inside Spain where her plays were performed in Madrileño theaters. One of her major contributions was in changing the medium from which feminist themes were shared, with her primary themes being the problem of subordination of women.

La condición social de la mujer en España was the most notable work of Margarita Nelken in this period. Published in 1919, it was revolutionary in Spanish feminism to the extent that it went beyond describing the problems of women to proscribing solutions, and advocating for changes in women's relationships to groups like working and middle-class men, women of different classes, and institutions like the Catholic Church. Writing from a socialist perspective, her feminist works sought to address the conflict between the roles women were expected to maintain in a patriarchal society.

=== Education ===
The cultural situation in Spain resulted in a largely uneducated female population, with the literary rate for women only at 10% in 1900. The number of women known to have university titles in the period between 1800 and 1910 was around one, with María Goyri being the exception among Spanish women. When education was offered to women, it was with the goal of improving their performance in their domestic roles. This began to slowly change, with the literacy rate for women being 62% by 1930 and the gender ratio in schools being close to 50/50 on the primary school level. This did not carry over to universities, where only 4.2% of students were women in 1928.

Institución Libre de Enseñza (ILE) member Fernando de Castro, then dead of the Universidad de Madrid, created the "Sunday Lectures for the Education of Women" in 1868. In 1870, only 9.6% of women were literate, capable of reading and writing. Most of the lectures organized by Castro were around the theme of being a good wife and mother. Following the success of the Sunday lectures, Castro then helped create in 1869 the Ateneo for Women and the School for Female Teachers as a tool for getting women more involved in public life in Spain. Most of the women educated by these programs were ones with affluent, freethinking fathers.

María de Maeztu was an early twentieth century Spanish feminist and pedagogist. She helped co-found the International Institute for Young Ladies in Spain in 1913 as part of larger collaborative efforts. Two years later, she would go on to found the Residence for Young Ladies. She would continue to push for women's education in pre-Republican days. She founded the Lyceum Club Femenino in 1926 with cooperation for the International Institute for Young Women. The club was the first of its kind in Madrid. It would see its ranks include other important Spanish feminists of its day, including Isabel Oyarzabal de Palencia and Victoria Kent. It had over 500 members by 1930, and also included a branch in Barcelona.

The Feminine Youth University Group was created in 1920. It was an affiliate of the International Federation of University Women. The International Federation of University Women held their twelfth international congress in Madrid in 1928.

=== Childbirth and life expectancy ===
Infant mortality rates were very high in the late 1800s and early 1900s, and many children in Spain were born out of wedlock. Life expectancy for women was low, at 35 in 1902 and rising to 50 by 1930.

== Dictatorship of Primo de Rivera (1923–1930) ==
The Dictatorship of Primo de Rivera started in 1923 and continued until 1929, with its end resulting in elections being called for June 1931.

During the Dictatorship of Primo de Rivera's had no real national congress until the creation of the Asamblea Nacional Consultiva in 1927. Despite representing various factions across Spain by based on appointment, the body had very little power. A quota system drawn from 18 different regions of Spain, representing different political parties, determined who sat in the body. The last Asamblea Nacional Consultiva group had a representation of only 3% women. Some of the women who sat in the body were wives of nobility, who often did not take their role seriously. Some were drawn from wider society because of their contribution in culture and the arts. Their appointments were a desire to see women become more involved in political life.

PSOE and UGT both had internal divisions over whether to participate in the assembly as it lacked real powers. After much internal debate, both refused to participate. Consequently, the government appointed socialists to the assembly without any party or union oversight. María Cambrils would be one of these socialist women to serve in the 1927 Assembly.

=== Feminists ===
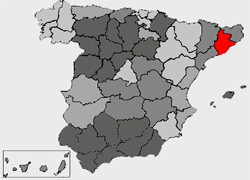
Location of the Province of Barcelona

The dictatorship of Primo de Rivera saw few feminist events in Spain. When they did organize, men viewed their activities as a joke. Feminine independence, principally organized in Madrid around the Lyceum Club, was condemned by members of the Catholic Church and viewed as scandalous in nature. It was viewed by some men as threatening to the status quo. Feminists in the dictatorship period were often focused on restrained but determined efforts to be nonconformist in their approach to womenhood. Most of their activity was devoted towards creating fictional works as a form of social criticism. Other feminist organizations also existed by 1920, though they were much less visible and successful in their goals. They included the Future and Feminine Progressive in Barcelona, the Concepción Arenal Society in Valencia and Feminine Social Action Group in Madrid. Most members came from middle-class backgrounds, and consequently did not represent the broader spectrum of women in Spain. The Feminine Socialist Group of Madrid met in 1926 to discuss women's rights. Attendees included Victoria Kent and Clara Campoamor.

In the lead up to the founding of the Second Republic and the Civil War, many middle class and upper-class women who became feminists did so as a result boarding school educations resulting in parents unable to guide the evolution of their political thoughts, fathers encouraging daughters towards political thinking, or being indoctrinated in classes essentially aimed at reinforcing societal gender norms. Left leaning families were more likely to see their ideas manifested by their daughters as feminists through active influence. Right leaning families were more likely to see their daughters become feminists through rigid gender norms resulting in a familial break.

Nelken saw both Socialists and the Catholics as offering little hope for women, as neither was capable of seeing the problems faced by women. This issue was one she saw as the central failing of feminism, a position that demonstrated a massive rift in Spanish feminism in the Primo de Rivera period.

=== Women's rights ===
Agrupación Femenina Socialista de Madrid were active during this period. Trying to engage more broadly, they invited three Madrid based women lawyers, Victoria Kent, Clara Campoamor and Matilde Huici, to speak at Casa del Pueblo to better understand women's demands during the period in 1925 and 1926. By 19 March 1926, Campoamor had withdrawn her assistance to Socialists working on women's issues.

=== Education ===
Prior to the Second Republic, Partido Socialista Obrero Español (PSOE) recognized that women workers lacked a compensatory educational system and access to educational facilities that was equivalent to their male peers. Yet, despite this, they failed to offer any sort of comprehensive policy solution to this problem and were not willing to advocate strongly on the need to address women's education. The extent of their activism for women's education were demands for integral education for men and women.

=== Employment and labor organizations ===
40% of all Spanish working women in 1930 worked in domestic roles, representing the largest single industry for which women were present.

Despite Primo de Rivera's view about the role of women, women were still able at times to have high ranking places in Spanish bureaucracy.

=== Political activity and government participation ===
When political activity occurred by women in the pre-Republican period, it was often spontaneous. They were also often ignored by left-wing male political leaders. Despite this, these riots and protests represented increasing political awareness among women of their need to be more active in social and political spheres to enact change to improve their lives.

Middle-class women in urban areas, freed from earlier labor in the home, began to start to lobby for changes to improve their own lives. This included things like changes to divorce laws, better education and equal pay. When politicians were faced with these demands, they often labeled them "women's issues." No serious reforms were able to be manifested under the Primo de Rivera dictatorship.

The 8 March 1924 Royal Decree's Municipal Statue Article 51 for the first time included an appendix which would allow electoral authorities on a municipal level to list women over the age of 23 who were not controlled by male guardians or the state to be counted. Article 84.3 said women could vote in municipal elections assuming they were the head of household, over the age of 23, and their state did not change. Changes were made the following month that allowed women who met those some qualifications to run for political office. Consequently, some women took advantage of this political opening, ran for office and won some seats in municipal governments as councilors and mayors.

Women would gain access to national representation during the 1927 - 1929 legislative period as a result of the Royal Decree Law of 12 September 1927, Article 15. This law stated, "to it may belong, indistinctly, males and females, single, widowed or married, these duly authorized by their husbands and as long as they do not belong to the Assembly [...]. Its designation will be made nominally and of Royal order of the Presidency, agreed in the Council of Ministers before October 6 next."

The 1927 - 1929 session also began the process of drafting a new Spanish constitution that would have fully franchised women voters in Article 55. The article was not approved. Despite this, women were eligible to serve in the national assembly in the Congreso de los Diputados, and fifteen women were appointed to seats on 10 October 1927. Thirteen were members part of the National Life Activities Representatives (Spanish: Representantes de Actividades de la Vida Nacional). Another two were State Representatives (Spanish: Representantes del Estado). These women included María de Maeztu, Micaela Díaz Rabaneda and Concepción Loring Heredia. During the Congreso de los Diputados's inaugural session in 1927, the President of the Assembly specifically welcomed the new women, claiming the exclusion of them had been unjust.

Loring Heredia would interrupt and demand an explanation from the Minister of Public Instruction and Fine Arts on 23 November 1927, marking the first time a woman had done this on the floor of Congress.

=== Daily life for women ===
In the days of the pre-Republic period and dictatorship, women on the streets of major cities like Barcelona and Madrid were often subjected to street harassment.

Women entered the workforce in much more visible numbers in this period, working in universities, and the service sector. Women had also encroached on the previously masculine domain of cafes and ateneos. The 1920s saw a backlash against women in conservative circles, with many men seeing these women as gender confused.

== Second Spanish Republic (1931–1937) ==
One of the most important things about the Second Republic for women is it allowed them to formally enter the public sphere en masse. The period also saw a number of rights available to women for the first time. This included the right to vote, divorce and access to higher education.

=== Elections in the Second Republic ===
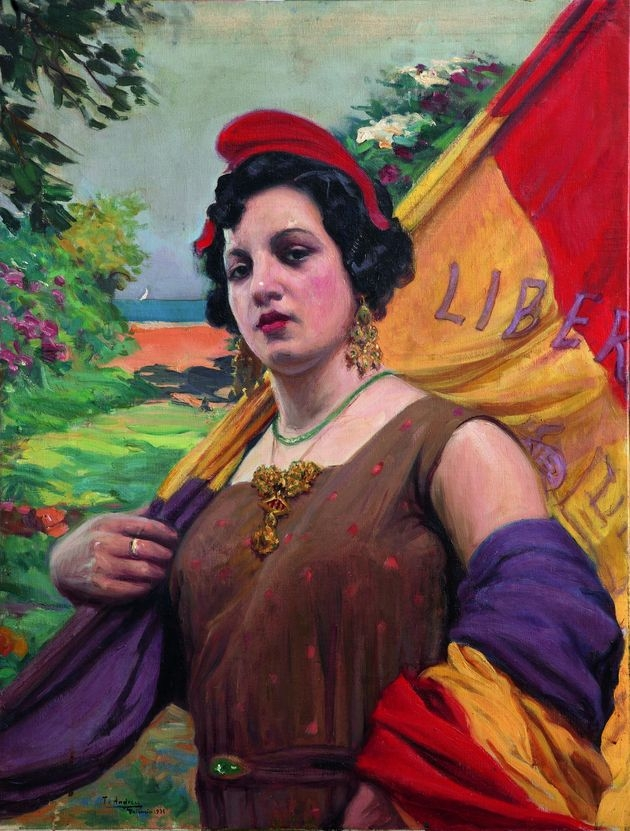
"República Española" (1931) by painter Teodoro Andreu

The Spanish monarchy ended in 1931. Following this and the end of the Dictatorship of Primo de Rivera, the Second Republic was formed. The Second Republic had three elections before being replaced by the Franco dictatorship. These elections were held in 1931, 1933 and 1936.

==== June 1931 Elections ====
Following the failure of the Primo de Rivera dictatorship, Spain set about writing a constitution. The initial draft did not give women the right to vote, though it did give them the right to run for office on 8 May 1931 for the June elections. Three women would win seats in Spain's national congress, the Cortes in the 1931 elections, Spain's Cortes were Clara Campoamor Rodríguez, Victoria Kent Siano and Margarita Nelken y Mansbergen.

Campoamor, in arguing for women's suffrage before the Cortes on 1 October 1931, that women were not being given the right to vote as a prize, but as a reward for fighting for the Republic. Women protested the war in Morocco. Women in Zaragoza protested the war in Cuba. Women went in larger numbers to protest the closer of Ateneo de Madrid by the government of Primo de Rivera. She also argued that women's inclusion was fundamental to saving the Republic by having a politically engage populace, so that the errors of the French Republic would not be repeated.

Kent, in contrast, received much more support from Spain's right, including Catholics and traditionalists, during this period of constitutional debate as she, alongside Nelken, opposed women's suffrage. Kent and Campoamor became involved in a grand debate over the issue, receiving large amounts of press related to their arguments around women's suffrage.

==== 1933 Elections ====
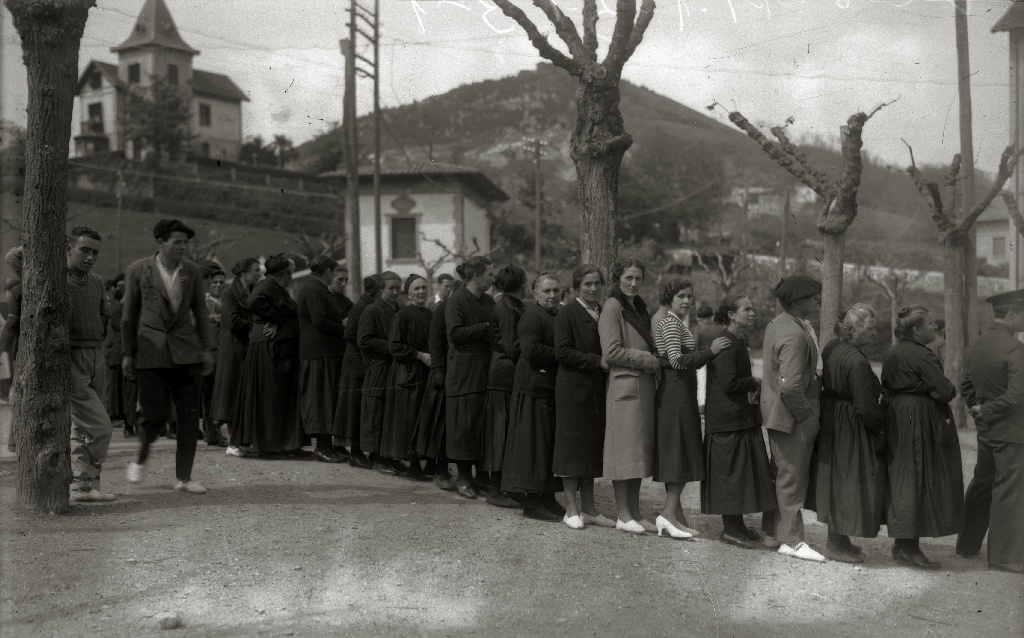
Men and women wait at Escuela Biteri in Hernani to vote in the 1933 elections.

For the first time, for the 1933 elections, women could vote in the national elections. The victory of conservative factions in the 1933 elections was blamed on women, and their voting practices in that election. They were viewed as being controlled by the Church.

Campoamor, along with Kent, lost her seat in the Cortes following the 1933 elections. The most active of the three women elected in 1931, she had been heckled in the congress during her two-year term for her support of divorce. She continued to serve in government though after being appointed the head of Public Welfare later that year, only to leave her post in 1934 in protest to the government response to the 1934 Revolution of Asturias.

Nelken faced similar problems in the Cortes. Her mother was French and her father was a German Jew. As a consequence, before she was allowed to sit in 1931, Nelken had to go through special bureaucratic procedures to insure she was a naturalized Spanish citizen. Her political interests were looked down upon by her male peers, including Prime Minister Manuel Azaña. Her feminist beliefs worried and threatened her male colleagues in the Cortes. Despite this, she was reelected in 1933, and found herself subject to constant attacks in the media as she proved a constant irritant to male party members who sometimes resorted to racist attacks in the Cortes to shut her down. Still, she persevered, winning election 1931, 1933 and 1936. Disillusionment with the party led her to change membership to the Communist Party in 1937.

Matilde de la Torre won election in 1933, representing Asturias in the Cortes.

CNT helped bring a right wing government to power after the 1933 elections by refusing to support the Popular Front alliance, and largely chose to abstain from the elections. They changed their positions for the 1936 elections, which assisted in bring the left back into power in the Second Republic.

==== February 1936 elections ====
During the elections, pamphlets were distributed in Seville that warned women that a leftist Republican victory would result in the government removing their children from their homes and the destruction of their families. Other pamphlets distributed by the right in the election warned that the left would turn businesses over to the common ownership of women.

Ibárruri campaigned for a deputy in the Cortes ahead of the 1936 elections as a member of the Popular Front. During her campaign in Asturias, she campaigned before groups of Socialists, Communists, Anti-fascists and Republicans. She used her experiences to improve her oratory skills that would serve her later during the Civil War by observing other speakers who managed to successfully engage audiences. Ibárruri won, and entered the Cortes as a member of the Popular Front, in the Communist minority. Unlike some of their peers on the left, she and other Communists advocated citizens taking up arms in preparation for what they saw as the coming conflict.

The February 1936 elections saw the return of a leftist government. Together, the various left wing groups formed the Popular Front. They replaced a repressive right leaning government that had been in power for the two previous years.

The Popular Front won elections in February 1936 on a progressive platform, promising major reforms to government. In response, even as the left began reform plans to undo conservative efforts in the previous government, the military began planning how to overthrow the new government. Popular Front, in contrast, refused to arm its own supporters out of fear they would then use them against the Government.

The 1936 elections saw Julia Alvarez Resano enter parliament as a member of PSOE. She came to the Cortes having previously served as a defense lawyer for the Spanish Federation of Land Workers. Matilde de la Torre won election again in 1936.

=== Women's rights ===
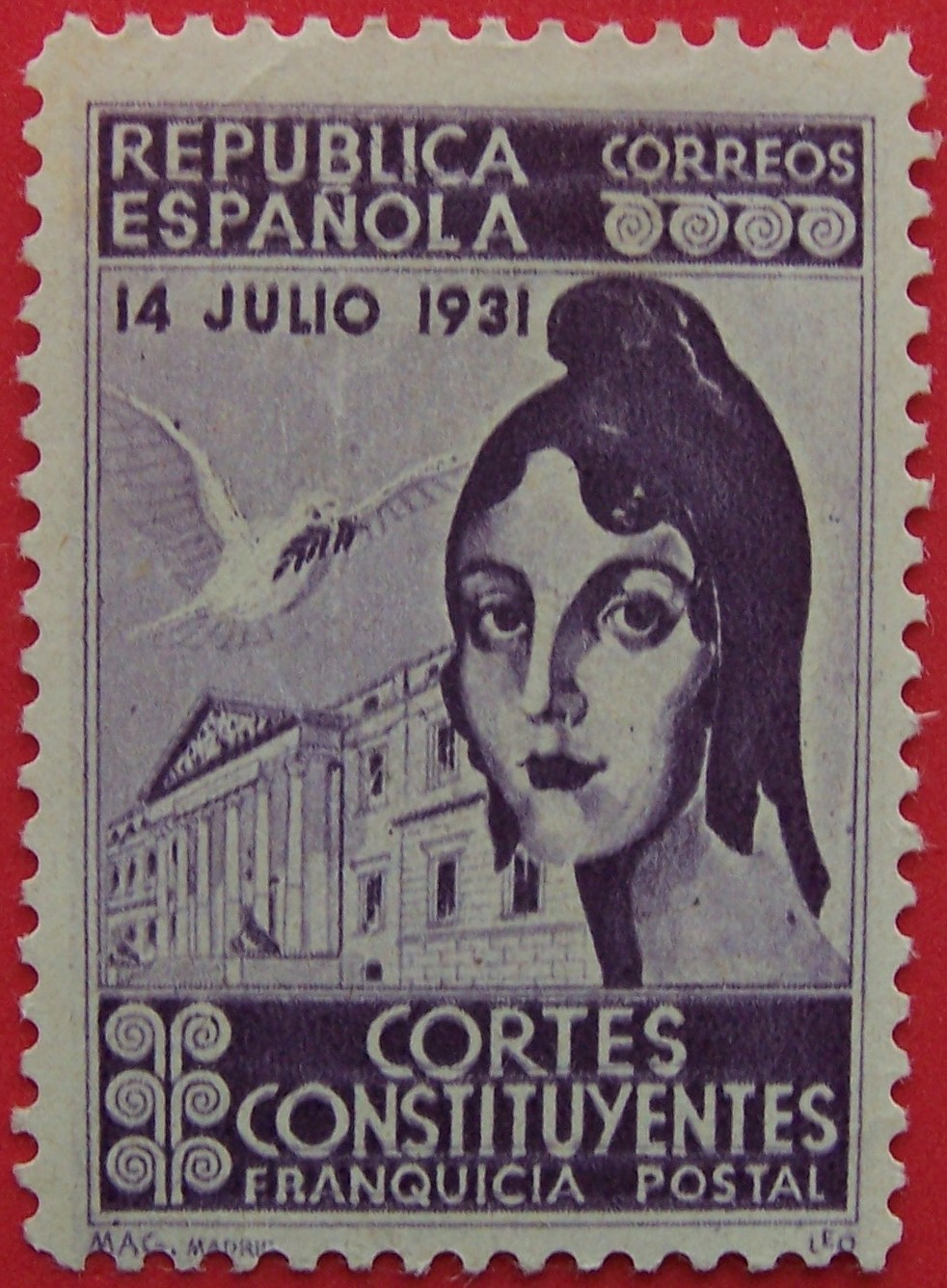
A postage stamp by issued by Correos during the Second Republic honoring women in the 1931 Cortes Constituyentes

The founding of the Second Republic in 1931 brought in a five-year period that began to see both a change in historical gender roles and in legal rights for women. These changes were slowed in 1933, after a conservative block came into power. This group tried and succeed in rolling back many of the reforms passed in the previous two years.

The Second Republic brought in legal and cultural changes for women in Spain, with most reforms occurring within the first two years of its founding on 14 April 1931. The debate over women's suffrage began in the Cortes in 1931. This debate brought more attention to the legal status of women by Spanish Republicans. In turn, this led to many Republicans wanting to bring women into the public sphere, making women and their problems more visible, as a way to further advance the Republican political agenda. Women eventually gained absolute equality under the law during the Second Republic. Because of a deteriorating political situation and economic difficulties in the country, many of the rights attached to this were never fully realized or were later reversed.

One of the first laws implemented allowed women to vote and to run for political office. This happened with Article 36 of the Constitution of the Second Republic, and came into force on 1 October 1931. The first women to win seats in Spain's Cortes were Clara Campoamor Rodríguez, Victoria Kent Siano and Margarita Nelken y Mansbergen. They won these seats in June 1931, several months before women were given the right to vote. They were joined in February 1936 by Matilde de la Torre, Dolores Ibárruri and Federica Montseny. Nelken and Kent had both opposed giving women's suffrage, arguing most women would vote for conservatives because of the influence of their husbands and the clergy, thus undermining the Spanish Republic. Campoamor, in contrast, was a strong advocate of women's suffrage. Montseny became Spain's first female minister, serving as the Minister of Health and Public Assistance from September 1936 to May 1937. Federica Montseny was the Anarchist counterpart to the Communist Stalinist Dolores Ibárrui.

Other laws passed during the Second Republic included maternity leave, civil marriage and no fault divorce. Contraception was also legalized. Despite divorce being made legal by the Second Republic, in practice it rarely occurred and only generally in large, liberal cities. The first year divorce was allowed in the Second Republic, only 8 of 1,000 marriages ended in divorces in Madrid.

Many of the issues brought up by women were portrayed as the "question of women", which served to remove women's only policies from broader debates about societal needs. They removed them from context, and in turn served to re-inforce societal views about gender.

As a result of being locked out of or largely ignored by men leading political, anarchist and labor organizations, women created their own organizations during the Second Republic. One such organization was Mujeres Antifascists founded in 1933. It attracted support from many middle-class women, and sought to address issues like wage inequality, childcare provisions and employment opportunities in 1936. At the same time, they also wanted to increase the number of women serving on local councils.

Legal equality for women was opposed by many on Spain's right. They saw it as a degeneration of Spain, which would result in the destruction of the Spanish family. This tension about the rights of women was part of their tension over the existence of the Republic, and one of the reason they were opposed to it.

=== Education ===
The Second Republic had a goal of educating women. This was viewed as a radical concept, and many reactionaries inside the Republic were opposed to it. Many others supported it, seeing education as a tool to allow women to pass along Republican values to their children.

=== Feminism ===
Feminism in the Republican and Civil War eras was typically about "dual militancy," and was greatly influenced by anarchism, and understanding the role feminism should play in society. The Civil War would serve as a break point for feminist activity inside Spain. There was little continuity in pre-war and post war Spanish feminism.

==== Feminist organizations ====
===== Female Republican Union =====
Clara Campoamor created the Female Republican Union (Spanish: Unión Republicana de Mujeres) during the early part of the Second Republic. Female Republican Union had the sole purpose of advocating for women's suffrage. It was often polemetic in its opposition to Kent's group Foundation for Women, and its opposition to women's suffrage.

===== Foundation for Women =====
Victoria Kent and Margarita Nelken founded the Foundation for Women (Spanish: Asociación Nacional de Mujeres Española) in 1918. Foundation for Women was a radical socialist organization at its inception, and aligned themselves with PSOE. The organization opposed women's suffrage, even as its founders sat in Spain's Cortes. The belief was if women were given the right to vote, most women would vote as their husbands and the Catholic Church told them to. This would fundamentally damage the secular nature of the Second Republic, by bringing in a democratically elected right wing government.

=== Employment and labor organizations ===
Margarita Balaguer attempted to collectivize seamstresses working with her at an haute coutre fashion house during the Second Republic. Her efforts proved unsuccessful, largely as a result of her inability to connect with her co-workers as women in explaining the need to organize a union with them.

Gibraltar was a major employer in southern Spain during the Second Republican, which upset the Spain's Ministry of State who felt they could not do much as the local economy benefited from the higher wages people earned there. While 4,000 men worked in the port, around 2,400 Spanish women made the daily voyage across the border to work in domestic roles in hotels, laundries, shops, cafes and homes of locals.

=== Political activity ===
The changing political landscape of the Second Republic meant there was an environment for the first time in which women's political organizations could flourish.

Women were also largely locked out of organized political groups and events in this period, even when said groups claimed to be for gender equity. Major trade unions at the time like UGT and CNT ignored specific needs of women, including maternity leave, childcare provisions and equal pay; they instead focused on general needs or needs of men in the workforces they represented. The CNT also perpetuated gender inequality, by paying its female employees less than men in comparable positions. Only 4% of UGT's membership was female by 1932.

One of the biggest challenges faced by leftist women was Marxism prioritized the issue of class equality over gender issues. For anarchists, syndicalists, communist and socialist women, this often resulted in male leadership deprioritizing women's needs and locking women out of participation and governance as their needs did not directly relate to the class struggle. Some leftist men, both in political and labor organizations, also resented women entering the workforce, viewing their lower wages as contributing to employers lowering wages among male workers.

Despite differences in ideology, communist, Republican and socialist women would come together for discussions about the political issues of the day. They also worked to mobilize women en masse to protest issues they felt were important. One such mobilization occurred in 1934, when the Republican government considered mobilizing its reserve forces military action in Morocco. Within hours of the news hitting the streets, Communist, Republican and Socialist women had organized a women's march to protest the proposed action in Madrid. Many women were arrested, taken to the police headquarters and later released.

==== Anarchists ====
On the whole, the anarchist movement's male leadership engaged in deliberate exclusion of women and discouragement from seeking leadership positions in these organizations. Women were effectively locked out of the two largest anarchist organizations, Confederación Nacional del Trabajo (CNT) and the Federación Anarquista Ibérica (FAI).

===== Confederación Nacional del Trabajo (CNT) =====
CNT was one of the two major anarchist organizations active during the Second Republic. By July 1936, their membership ranks were over 850,000, and were organized by region and sector of employment. CNT ignored specific needs of women, including maternity leave, childcare provisions and equal pay; they instead focused on general needs or needs of men in the workforces they represented. The CNT also perpetuated gender inequality, by paying its female employees less than men in comparable positions.

===== Federación Anarquista Ibérica (FAI) =====
Federación Anarquista Ibérica (FAI) was one of the two major anarchist organizations in the Spanish Second Republic. It was created by more militant members of CNT. Women found it difficult to join the organization, and even more difficult to get leadership positions.

===== Federació Ibèrica de Joventuts Llibertàries (JJLL) =====
Federació Ibèrica de Joventuts Llibertàries (FIJL, JJLL or JJAA) was founded in 1932 as an ancharist youth organization. It was one the third most important anarchist organization of its day. Like CNT and FAI though, it largely rejected women's issues and discouraged women from becoming involved in its governance. Like both FAI and CNT, it focused on the rights of Spain's working class.

===== Mujeres Libres =====
Existing tensions within the anarchist movement, as a result of deliberate exclusion or discouragement by male leadership, eventually led to the creation of Mujeres Libres by Lucia Sánchez Saornil, Mercedes Comaposada and Amparo Poch y Gascón in May 1936, shortly before the start of the Civil War. Suseso Portales served as the national vice-secretary. Initially based in Madrid and Barcelona, the organization had the purpose of seeking emancipation for women. Their goals also included "to combat the triple enslavement to which (women) have been subject: enslavement to ignorance, enslavement as women and enslavement as workers". It was from the anarchist movement that many militia women (Spanish: milicianas) were to be drawn.

Mujeres Libres organized ideological classes designed to raise the female consciousness. Compared to their fellow Second Wave feminists in the United States, they were more radical in that they provided job training skills, health information sessions, and classes where they taught other women how to read. This information was viewed as critical if they wanted women to be part of the wider revolutionary movement. Lack of education was one of the reasons men had sidelined many other women in the movement, and Mujeres Libres sought to remove this sexist rational. In their approach to women's liberation as requiring multiple solutions, they ended up being closer ideologically to intersectional feminism. Mujeres Libres also set up storefront cultural centers (Spanish: ateneos libertario), which provided solutions on the local level, and decentralized governance in a way that made it accessible to everyone. They avoided direct political engagement through lobbying of the government. They also did not identify as feminist, as they saw goals of other feminists at the time as too limited in their scope for the freedom they sought for their fellow women, perceiving feminism as too bourgeoisie. It is only starting in the 1990s that they have been identified by academics as such.

==== Anti-fascists ====
===== Partido Obrero de Unificación Marxista (POUM) =====
One of Partido Obrero de Unificación Marxista (POUM)'s goals during the early part of the Second Republic was to give working-class women a feeling of empowerment. To do this, the Women's Secretariat set about organizing neighbor hood women's committees to address day-to-day concerns of women living in specific areas.

POUM's Women's Secretariat also trained women in cities like Barcelona in using weapons. They wanted women to feel prepared for the war that seemed inevitable.

Known as the Women's Cultural Grouping in Barcelona, POUM's women's group also organized classes in Barcelona that saw hundreds of women taking part. Classes focused on hygiene, knitting, sewing, reading books, children's welfare and discussing a broad range of topics including socialist, women's rights, the origin of religious and social identities.

Contacts took place in this period between POUM's Alfredo Martínez and leadership in Mujeres Libres in Madrid about possibly forming an alliance. These talks never went anywhere.

==== Communists ====
===== Partido Comunista de España =====
During the Second Republic, Partido Comunista de España was the primary Communist political organization in Spain.

Communists began to recognize the importance of women during the Second Republic, and started to actively seek female members to broader their female based in 1932. To this further this goal, the first Communist women's organization, Committee of Women against War and Fascism in Spain, was created as a way of trying to attract women to Communist connected unions in 1933. Membership for women in PCE's Asturias section in 1932 was 330, but it grew By 1937, it had increased to 1,800 women.

During the Austrian miners action, the government of the Second Republic responded by arresting thousands of miners and closing down their workers centers. Women rose up to support striking and imprisoned miners by advocating for their release and taking jobs to support their families. PCE male leadership strove to find roles for women that better comported with what they saw as more acceptable for their gender and better fit into the new, more conservative legal framework being created by the Second Republic. This included changing the name of the Committee for Women against War and Fascism to Pro-Working Class Children Committee. PCE's goal and the actual result was to discourage women's active participation in labor protests.

VII Comintern Congress in 1935 in Moscow had two representatives from the PCE. They were Ibárruri and Jose Díaz. Sesé and Arlandis attended as a representative of the Communist Party of Catalonia. Ibárruri's profile rose so much during the Second Republic, while being coupled with the outlawing of the Communist Party, that she was regularly hunted by the Spanish police. This made it difficult for her to travel, both internally and externally. Being too close to her would also prove deadly. Twenty-three year old Juanita Corzo, a member of Women Against War, would was given a death sentence in 1939 for aiding Ibárruri, which was later commuted to life in prison.

Women in Partido Comunista de España faced sexism on a regular basis, which prevent them from rising up the ranks in leadership. They were denied the ability to be fully indoctrinated by keeping them out of Communist ideological training classes. At the same time, men insisted women were not capable of leadership because they were not educated in these principals. The sexism these leftist women faced was similar to their counterparts on the right, who were locked out of activities of the Catholic Church for the exact same reason.

For the 1936 May Day celebrations, the Communist Party of Spain worked hard to convey a perception that they were one of the dominant political groups in the country by turning out party members in Madrid. They successfully organized hundred of Communist and Socialist women to participate in a march, where they chanted "Children yes, husbands no!" (Spanish: ¡Hijos sí, maridos no!) with their fists clenched in the air behind huge Lenin and Stalin banners. The party the year was also successful in convincing many socialist women to embrace Bolshevism.

Matilde Landa became a PCE militant during the Second Republic while in Madrid. Following the start of the civil war, she worked at a PCE affiliated war hospital in Madrid. In 1939, she was tasked with reorganizing Madrid's Comité Provincial del Partido Comunista. Soon after, she was arrested by the Francoist government. Put into a prison in Sales, she was given a death sentence where she worked to overturn her and other women's death sentences by engaging in a writing campaign. By 1940, her death sentence was commuted and she was moved to a women's prison in Palma de Mallorca. This was one of the worst post-war women's prisons in Spain, where prison leaders also attempted coerced conversion to Catholicism. Rather than go through with a forced baptism in 1942, she committed suicide using a weapon. Landa did not immediately die, and lay in agony for over almost an hour before she died. During this time, prison officials baptized her.

===== Spanish Committee of Women against War and Fascism =====
The Spanish Committee of Women against War and Fascism was founded as a women's organization affiliated with Partido Comunista de España in 1933. They represented a middle class feminist movement. As a result of PCE male governance trying to remove women from more active roles in the Communist movement, its name was changed to Pro-Working Class Children Committee around 1934 following the Asturian miners strike.

Dolores Ibárruri, Carmen Loyola, Encarnación Fuyola, Irene Falcón, Elisa Uriz and María Martinez Sierra, part of a larger group representing Spain's communist, anarchist and socialist factions, attended the 1933 World Committee of Women against War and Fascism meeting in France.

===== Falangists =====
====== Seccion Feminina ======
Sección Femenina was founded in 1934 as a women's auxiliary to the Falangist party by Pilar Primo de Rivera, sister of the founder of the Falangist party. Fascist in the mold of Mussolini's Italian party, both organizations were misogynistic in their approach to the goals of building a revolutionary organic society that would support traditional Spanish values. There were three things they saw as critical to doing this: the family, the municipality and the syndicate. Using traditional gender roles from the Catholic Church, they would impose their values on women in the home. By 1939, Sección Femenina would eclipse the male run party in memberships, with over half a million women belonging to the group.

==== Republicans ====
===== Partido de Unión Republicana (PUR) =====
Despite many divisions on the left, Communist and other women would often visit Republican Union Party (Spanish: Partido de Unión Republicana) (PUR) centers, where they would interact with other leftist women and discuss the political situation of the day during the early period of the Second Republic. Participants included Dolores Ibárruri, Victoria Kent and Clara Campoamor. Many of these women were very knowledgeable about these topics, more so than many of their male peers. This cross party collaborative discussion was at times threatening to male leaders in parties like the Republican Union Party, who in 1934 put a stop to it by posting police officers at the entrances to keep non-party members out. As a consequence, many women left the Republican Union Party at this time.

==== Socialists ====
Prominent women socialists included Matilde Huici, Matilde Cantos and Matilde de la Torre. Women's caucus were often very weak inside the broader socialist party governance structure. As a consequence, they were often ineffective in advocating for women's rights.

===== Partido Socialista Obrero Español =====
In general, PSOE began espousing a more militant approach to combating right wing actors inside Spain, continuing this thinking as the history of the Second Republic chugged along in the face of increasing numbers of labor conflicts and male leadership quarrels.

Nelken was the political leader of the PSOE's women's wing. Her feminist beliefs worried and threatened her male colleagues in the Cortes. Despite this, Nelken was the only woman during the Second Republic to win three elections for the Socialists to serve in the Cortes. Her election wins came in 1931, 1933 and 1936. Disillusionment with the party led her to change membership to the Communist Party in 1937.

During the immediate pre-Civil War period, Campoamor tried to rejoin the Spanish socialists but was repeatedly rejected. Her support of universal suffrage, feminist goals and divorce had made her an anathema to the male dominated party leadership. Eventually, in 1938, she went into exile in Argentina.

Martinez Sierra served for a time as a Socialist deputy in 1933.

=== Prison reform ===
In 1931, Kent became the Director General of the Spanish prison system. She was the first woman to hold this post, and she largely disengaged from politics in order to enact reforms to the system.

Kent changed prison guards in women's prisons from Catholic nuns to trained lay officials, who received instruction for their roles at the newly created Feminine Corps of Prison. She set about humanizing prisons, by trying to make them into correctional institutions. In some cases, this meant permitting prisoners to leave and return under specific circumstances. She set up the Model Prison in Las Ventas, which was designed to hold around 500 prisoners.

=== Pre-war interactions with the Guardia Civil and Falange ===
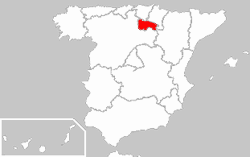
Location of La Rioja, home region to Arnedo near Logroño, where four women were killed in 1931

Near the end of 1931, workers at a shoe factor in the village of Arnedo near Logroño were fired because they were members of Unión General de Trabajadores (UGT). Villagers decided to protest their firing outside the townhall, and were fired upon for no discernible reason by the Guardia Civil. Four women, a child and a male worker were killed, while another thirty were injured.

Falangists were seeking to engage in attacks that would provoke Republican reprisals in 1935 and 1939. One such attack occurred on 9 March 1936 in Granada during a strike by workers. A squad of Falangist loyalist fired on workers, and their families who were protesting with them. Among the wounded were many women and children. The left in the city immediately retaliated by calling for a general strike, and people in the city setting fire to the offices of Falange, Acción Popular, the offices of the newspaper Ideal and two churches.

=== October Revolution of 1934 ===
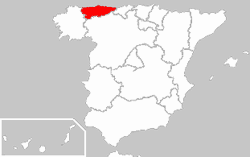
Location of Asturias, Spain

Women played roles behind the scenes in one of the first major conflicts of the Second Republic, when workers' militias seized control of the mines in Asturias. Originally planned as a nationwide strike, the workers collective action only really took place in Asturias. Some women were involved in propaganda and others in assisting the miners. After the government quelled the insurrection by bringing in Moroccan legionaries, some 30,000 people found themselves in prison and another 1,000 were put into graves. A large number of those put into prison were women. Women also played an advocacy role in trying to see their husbands and male relatives released.

During the Austrian miners action, the government of the Second Republic responded by arresting thousands of miners and closing down their workers centers. Women rose up to support striking and imprisoned miners by advocating for their release and taking jobs to support their families. Following this, Partido Comunista de España tried to intentionally repress its female membership from becoming more politically active from within the party. During fighting in Oviedo, women were on the battlefield serving in a variety of roles. At least one attended to the wounded while shelling went on around her. Others took up arms. Still more went from leftist position to leftist position with active shelling happening, providing fighters with food and motivational speeches.

During the Asturian conflict, there were a few instances of women initiated violence. This fed into paranoia among those on the right that women would violently try to seize power from men. Both on the left and the right, these women were not viewed as heroic, and men wanted to limit their potential for further political action. Women were also involved in building barricades, clothing repair, and street protests. For many women, this was the first time they were civically engaged without a male chaperone as in many cases, they were working on behalf of imprisoned male relatives. Women were also killed in this conflict. Aida Lafuente was active on the front, and died during the Asturian conflict.

There were a number of women playing important roles behind the scenes in organizing. They included Dolores Ibárruri, Isabel de Albacete and Alicia García. They were aided by the PCE's Committee to Aid Workers' Children.

More recently, academics have debated if the Asturian miners's strike represented the real start of the Spanish Civil War. Imagery from the conflict was subsequently used by both sides for propaganda to further their own agenda, particularly inside PSOE who saw it the situation as a call for political unity on the left if they were to have any hope of countering the rise of fascism in Spain. PSOE consequently used a lot of gendered imagery to sell people on their ideas. Propaganda used featuring the events in October 1934 featured women in gender conforming ways that did not challenge their roles as feminine. This was done by male leadership with the intention of counteracting the image of strong women political leaders, who unnerved many on the right. Right wing propaganda at the time featured women as vicious killers, who defied gender norms to eliminate the idea of Spanish motherhood.

=== Start of the Civil War ===
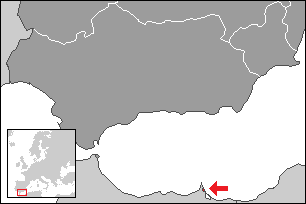
Location of Melilla, where Nationalist forces started their campaign in 1936

On 17 July 1936, the Unión Militar Española launched a coup d'état in North Africa and Spain. They believed they would have an easy victory. They failed to predict the people's attachment to the Second Republic. With the Republic largely maintaining control over its Navy, Franco and others in the military successfully convinced Adolf Hitler to provide transport for Spanish troops from North Africa to the Iberian peninsula. These actions led to a divided Spain, and the protracted events of the Spanish Civil War. It would not officially end until 1 April 1939.

Franco's initial coalition included monarchists, conservative Republicans, Falange Española members, Carlist traditionalist, Roman Catholic clergy and the Spanish army. They had support from fascist Italy and Nazi Germany. The Republican side included Socialists, Communists, and various other left wing actors.

The military revolt was announced on the radio across the country, and people took to the streets immediately as they tried to determine the extent of the situation, and if it was a military or political conflict. Ibárruri would soon coin the phrase "¡No pasarán!" a few days later, on 18 July 1936 in Madrid while on the radio from the Ministry of the Interior's radio station, saying, "It is better to die on your feet than live on your knees. ¡No pasarán!"

At the start of the Civil War, there were two primary anarchist organizations: Confederación Nacional del Trabajo (CNT) and the Federación Anarquista Ibérica (FAI). Representing working-class people, they set out to prevent the Nationalists from seizing control while also serving as reforming influences inside Spain.

Great Britain, France, Germany, Italy and the Soviet Union signed the Non-Intervention Treaty in August 1936, promising not to provide material support for the war to any of the parties, even as Germany and Italy were already and continued to provide support to Spain's fascists.

== Spanish Civil War (1936–1939) ==
=== Daily life for women ===
During the Civil War, the problems of everyday life for women changed at times. In major cities like Madrid and Barcelona, women were subjected to much less street harassment. When serving out near the front, men and women could share the same men bed without women having to fear being molested. Women had gone from being objects of men's attention to being viewed as fellow human beings. By the final stretch of the war, women were having to do the jobs of men in many cases as there were not enough men around to do them. Their presence and the need of their presence often induced anxiety among men, who felt threatened by their presence in factories.

As a result of the start of the Civil War, many women's organizations on both the right and the left were shutting down.

=== Women's rights ===
During the Second Republic and during the initial stages of the Civil War, there was a social and economic revolution in women's rights, especially in areas like Catalonia. Because of the nature of war, many reforms were sporadically and inconsistently implemented, and advances made during the latter half of 1936 were largely erased by May 1937.

On 25 December 1936, the Generalitat de Cataluña made abortion legal for the first time in the history of Spain following a decree from the Health Department. The anarchist-dominated Health Department then followed this up in March 1937 with regulations for hospitals and clinics about how to conduct abortions. The same government also for the first time provided government sponsored information and access to birth control, coupling it with information and treatment for venereal disease.

Women's liberation failed on the Republican side by the close of the Civil War. The lack of implementing full liberation during the peaceful period of the Second Republic was a leading cause, as sexist thinking that existed on that side had continued to exist and only found itself being further reinforced as the war progressed.

In August 1936, the Commission of Women's Aid in Madrid was created following a decree by the Republican Prime Minister.

=== Feminism ===
In the Civil War period, mainstream leftist feminism often took on an individualistic approach to addressing inequalities. There was also often battles over this issue, whether the personal should be political and vice versa.

A few groups challenged the mainstream feminism of the period, including Mujeres Libres. While deliberately rejecting the label of feminism, the group's version of feminism was about creating leadership structures that incorporated everyone, instead of having a feminist leadership model that paralleled patriarchal ones. Many feminists disliked the organization though, as it was affiliated with CNT, where women were often locked out of leadership positions and instead encouraged into their women's auxiliary organization. Others disliked Mujeres Libres decision to downplay the role of specific female leaders, and instead make all feminist actions appear the sole result of collectivist action.

=== Gender roles ===
The Spanish Civil War served to break traditional gender roles on the Republican side. It allowed women to fight openly on the battlefield, a rare occurrence in twentieth century European warfare.

The war also served to remove the influence of the Catholic Church in defining gender roles on the Republican side.

While the war broke down gender norms, it did not create an equitable employment change or remove the domestic tasks as the primary role of women. Behind the scene, away from the front, women serving in personal family and Republican opposition support roles were still expected to cook for soldiers, launder their uniforms, look after children and tend to dwellings. Women supporting CNT militants found themselves at once liberated from these gender roles, but still expected to serve male fighters in traditional roles.

=== Role in the family ===
Mothers had a variety of different experiences during the Civil War depending on their personal situations. Many mothers in rural areas were apolitical, no matter what side of the front they lived on. They had little access to resources that would have allowed them to be politically engaged, and were often short on resources required for basic living.

During the war, mothers worked hard to try to maintain a sense of normalcy. This included continuing domestic education, both among Republican and Nationalist women. Topics of focus included understanding the water, agriculture and religious education. Spanish sayings used by mothers at this time included, "After you eat, do not read a single letter." Reading was not viewed as good for digestion. Children were also encouraged by their mothers in rural areas to take a siesta after a meal.

Mothers would often engage in activities like slapping and hitting their children as a way of reinforcing social education.

Songs played an important part of rural life for women, in that singing signaled a woman was happy. For mothers, songs served another important function of passing along social values to their children. Songs also passed along messages about gender roles, including the importance of outward appearance.

During the war, many mothers went to great lengths to try to feed their children during periods of food shortages. They might sneak into other towns to try to get food rations when the ration in their town was too small. They might forgo eating themselves so their children could have bigger portions.

For many mothers in rural areas, the idea of being politically engaged was not possible. They had too many things they had to do at home to have time for that. They had to make soap. They had to work in the fields because of national rationing. Most Spanish homes during the war lacked running water at home. Mothers had to acquire water from local wells, lakes or rivers. They had to wash clothing for the whole family, making a journey to a body of water to do that. They also had to be home to prepare food when it was available. Most homes at this time did not have modern kitchens, and mothers had to cook over open flames using hay and wood for heat.

The war upset the social structure inside the family. Because of survival issues related to food and fear of political persecution, the skills of mother in acquiring and preparing food while also remaining politically invisible meant they began to take on the role of head of household. Silence became a virtue, because doing or saying the wrong thing could lead to death at the hands of Nationalist forces. Women were less likely to be harassed than men, which meant they were often more out of the home. This could create tensions behind closed doors, as it attacked traditional Spanish definitions of masculinity as it made the home the domain of the mother. This change of women being the boss of the home would continue after the Civil War for both Republican and Nationalist families.

The repressive nature of the Civil War and women needing to take charge of the family in rural Spain led to feelings of solidarity among women, and specifically mothers, in pueblos. It led to mothers creating a form of female specific identity that had largely not existed in rural Spain prior to the war.

=== Political parties and political activity ===
During the Spanish Civil War, various political and government forces on the Republican side tried to encourage women's participation on their side. Only one group though would be overtly about feminist goals. That group was Mujeres Libres. For the rest of the political parties, labor groups and government organizations, women's rights and feminists goals were not one of their top concerns.

Working-class girls involved with both anarchists and socialists often found themselves ostracizing women from other villages who came from different left wing political parties. There was a lack of solidarity. Pilar Vivancos explained this as a result of a lack of education among women, with patriarchy within parties being used to set women against each other instead of collectively workings towards emancipation of women. They did not understand what it truly meant, and it made them vulnerable to political puritanism that would later sweep through the left.
Women continued to be locked out of political activity on the Republican side. Meetings for women's rights among union members might be only be attended by men, as the idea of allowing women to attend political events was often alien.

==== Anarchists ====
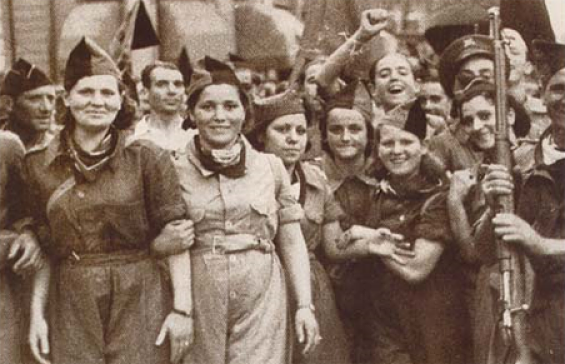
An Anarcha-feminist militia during the Spanish Social Revolution

During the Civil War, there were often tensions Mujeres Libres and other anarchist groups. The Economic Council of the Socialized Woodwork Industry and Solidaridad Internacional Antifascista both had women in high level leadership positions, and in leadership spots further down. In contrast, Mujeres Libres was a CNT auxiliary, and the women were often denied a specific spot at the table as there was a view among anarchist leaders that the adults, not women, should be the ones making decisions. Anarchists often were unwilling to give solidarity to women combating gender based problems at this time. There were always questions of if women should be fully integrated or should work in women's only groups to achieve specific aims. This resulted in making the movement less effective in accomplishing goals related to women.

Most of the militias that were created during the immediate outbreak of the Civil War came from civil society groups like trade unions and political parties. CNT, UGT and other unions stepped in to provide logistical support for many of these militias. The number of women mobilized was never high. Most joined in order to further support political ideologies they supported. Most came from militant libertarian organizations like CNT, FAI and FIJL. These militias often lacked the typical military structure in order to better represent their ideologies and better mobilize local populations.

===== Mujeres Libres =====
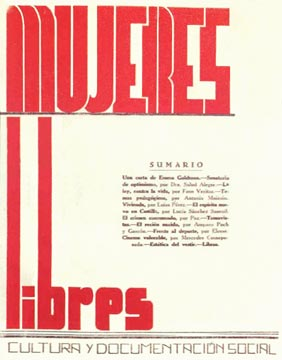
The first edition of Mujeres Libres, a magazine published by the organization of the same name

Mujeres Libres became one of the most important women's anarchist organizations during the Civil War. Their Civil War ranks were aided by women moving over from CNT to participation in their organization. The organization's importance was a result of the activities they were carrying out. They included running educational programming, and trying to increase the literacy rate among women. They were also organizing collective kitchens, parent controlled daycare centers, and providing prenatal and infant health information to expecting parents. One of their biggest struggles during the Civil War was around fighting prostitution. Education was viewed a key aspect of this, as they believed educated women would be less likely to turn to prostitution. They had over 20,000 members by 1938. Mujeres Libres also published a journal of the same name. Writings found in it focused on personal autonomy, the creation of female identities, and self-esteem. It also often addressed the conflicts in identity between being a woman and being a mother, and how women should navigate their identities as maternal figures.

The October 1938 CNT congress in Barcelona saw Mujeres Libres locked out, with the fifteen women strong delegation barred from entering. Women had previously been allowed to attend, but only as representatives of other, mixed gendered anarchist organizations. A women's only organization was not tolerated. The women protested this, and would not get an answer until an extraordinary meeting of CNT on 11 February 1939. When their answer came, it was that "an independent women's organization would undermine the overall strength of the libertarian movement and inject and element of disunity that would have negative consequences for the development of working-class interests and the liberarian movement on the whole."

Foreign anarchists often found organizations like Mujeres Libres baffling, as discussions around women's rights by Spanish anarchist women were often based around expanding rights while at the same time maintaining traditional gender roles. Older members were often critical of younger ones, whom they viewed as being too hesitant to act and over their perceived obsession on issues like sexuality, birth control and access to abortions.

Mujeres Libres folded by the end of the Civil War.

==== Anti-fascists ====
Anti-fascist organizations often attracted a heterogeneous membership. This at times could lead to major differences, discrepancies and priorities when it came to implementing anti-fascist programs. Different groups including socialists, communists and anarchists would sometimes work to take advantage of this inside these organizations.

===== Partido Obrero de Unificación Marxista (POUM) =====
Partido Obrero de Unificación Marxista (POUM) was the dissident communist party during this period. Their engagement for women involved trying to create specific female sub-organizations for them to join. In June 1937, the Franco regime and the Communists in control of Republican areas both declared POUM illegal, leading to the dissolution of the group. POUM women served on the front, but were also engaged in many other important roles including in POUM governance, writing and publishing POUM affiliated publications, and serving as teachers among the civilian population.

===== Agrupación de Mujeres Antifascistas =====
While the Agrupación de Mujeres Antifascistas (AMA) represented women from a wide variety of political backgrounds, it ended up serving as a vehicle of communist orthodoxy designed to mobile women to support the Communist cause on the Republican side of the civil war.

==== Centre right ====
===== Unión Democrática de Cataluña =====
Unión Democrática de Cataluña (UDC) saw a communist hegemony emerge by late 1937. They moved more away from their center right policies of their founding, and more towards positions supported by PSUC.

==== Communists ====
Asociación de Mujeres contra la Guerra y el Fascismo underwent a second name change in 1936, shortly after the start of the Civil War. Their new name was Agrupación de Mujeres Antifascistas. From there, the group would play a prominent role in sending and supporting women on the front lines in the war.

===== Partido Comunista de España =====
While other communist organizations existed, Partido Comunista de España remained the dominant one.

In the first year of the Civil War, the PCE rapidly increased their membership by nearly three-fold. Among the peasantry, women represented nearly a third of PCE's membership.

During the Civil War, Ibárruri earned herself the nickname La Pasionaria as she traveled the country to speak in opposition to Francoist forces. She also used radio to spread her message, becoming famous for calling men and women to arms, saying, "¡No pasarán!" One of the most famous phrases she uttered in the civil war was, "It is better to die on your feet than live on your knees." The Communist Party did not approve of her private life though, asking her to end her relationship with a male party member who was seventeen years younger than her, which she did.

Female Stalinists actively participated in POUM and Trotskyite purges in Barcelona. Women like Teresa Pàmies intentionally excluded POUM affiliated women even as they tried to build bridges with PSOE.

Teresa Pàmies wrote for a number of Communist publications during the war while she was only a teenager. These publications included Juliol, Treball, and La Rambla.

During the Civil War, Teresa Pàmies founded the Catalan branch of JSU. Near the end of the war, she was a delegate at the Second World Youth Peace Conference at Vassar College in the United States. While there, she was surrounded by all the Spanish leftist factions, except POUM.

Pàmies would also be responsible for isolating POUM's youth organization, Juventudes Comunistas Ibéricas, in such a way that it would leave blood on her hands. Teresa Pàmies exclusion of POUM is notable as her cousins were part of the organization, and her opinion of them was that they were committed anti-Fascists. T

==== Socialists ====
During the Civil War, broader problems that pre-dated it continued, and meant socialist groups tended to lack female participation. When socialist women wanted to get involved, they either had to do so through socialist youth organizations or they had to switch allegiances to the communist, who were more accepting of women and more likely to put them into leadership positions.

Abroad, socialist women were more active in their opposition to the Spanish Civil War. Belgian women socialists were opposed to their socialist party's neutrality during the Spanish Civil War. To counter this, these women socialist were active in trying to evacuate refugees. Among their accomplishments were evacuating 450 Basque children to Belgium in March 1937. With the assistance of the Belgian Red Cross and Communist's Red Aid, socialist women organized the placement of 4,000 Spanish refugees.

===== Partido Socialista Obrero Español =====
PSOE continued to ignore the unique problems of women during the Civil War. When women were interested in joining the party, they found themselves locked out of leadership positions. PSOE also refused to send women to the front, perpetuating the sexist belief that women could best serve the war effort by staying at home.

One of the few publicly socialist identified militia women in this period was María Elisa García, who served as a miliciana with the Popular Militias as a member of Asturias Battalion Somoza company.

===== Unified Socialist Party of Catalonia =====
Unified Socialist Party of Catalonia began to dominate on the socialist side in Catalonia late 1936, and finally consolidated power in 1937 on the Republican side.

=== Women in governance ===
Collectives were created during the Second Republic, and were run by village committees and general assemblies. These were supposed to work towards the well-being of the whole village, but in practice locked women out from participating and did not address their specific needs. This diminished status continued into the Civil War period.

==== Women's Aid Committee ====
The Women's Aid Committee was formed during the Civil War at the direction of the Minister of Defense. It was largely staffed by members of the Women Against War. Their activities included mobilizing women into large protest. One such protest demanded that men deemed non-essential by the government were sent to the front, with women taking their places in the workforce. The organization held its first national conference in 1937 in Valencia, drawing women from across Spain who represented all classes and leftist ideologies.

=== Civilian women on the home front ===
Many poor, illiterate and unemployed women often found themselves immersed in the ideological battle of the Civil War and its connected violence as a result of forces beyond her control. Some of these women chose to try to reassert control by becoming active participants in the violent struggle going on around them. When it came to deciding who was right and wrong, many women had to use their own moral judgement formed by a lifetime to do so. They were not guided by political radicalization leading to ideological based morality.

Women and children behind the lines were used by all sides, as a way of trying to garner support for their sides in the Civil War both internally and internationally. Nationalists often appealed to Catholics overseas, condemning Republican bombings on women in civil populations, claiming over 300,000 women and children had been killed. This met with limited success in the United States, where Catholics were uneasy with bombings against women and children that were being committed by both sides.

In the Republican offensive against Nationalist held Teruel from December 1937 to February 1938, brigades on the ground tried to honor Indalecio Prieto's call to protect civilians, and particularly women in children. They sometimes stopped shelling buildings when people inside made clear they were non-combatant women and children. The reality of the offensive and life on the front lines meant many of those civilians had nothing. Women would often risk their lives to loot recently shelled buildings. They needed furniture to burn to melt snow for water, to cook and to provide some heat. Many women, on both sides in the city, died of starvation during the month long battle.

One tactic employed by Nationalist troops was to use women to try to lure out Republican forces from concealed positions. They would use women's voices or get women to say they were civilians under siege. As a consequence, some Republican troops were hesitant when confronting women under apparent siege on the front as they did not always trust claims of needs for assistance.

Many women on the Republican side joined JSU, serving in civilian roles near the front.

From February to May 1937, there were many women led protests over the subsistence living created as a result of high food prices and bread shortages that came into great effect following the sixth anniversary of the Republic.

Spanish women supported the Republican war efforts behind the frontlines. They made uniforms, worked in munitions factors, and served in women's corps similar to those organized by the US and British during World War I.

The start of the Civil War saw women in Barcelona change their behavior, notably in the way they dressed. For the first time, they were able to appear in public wearing pants without people perceiving them as violating societal norms about decency.

In Madrid, women would go in pairs to cafes around the city, collecting money to support in the war effort.

==== Republican women behind Nationalist lines ====
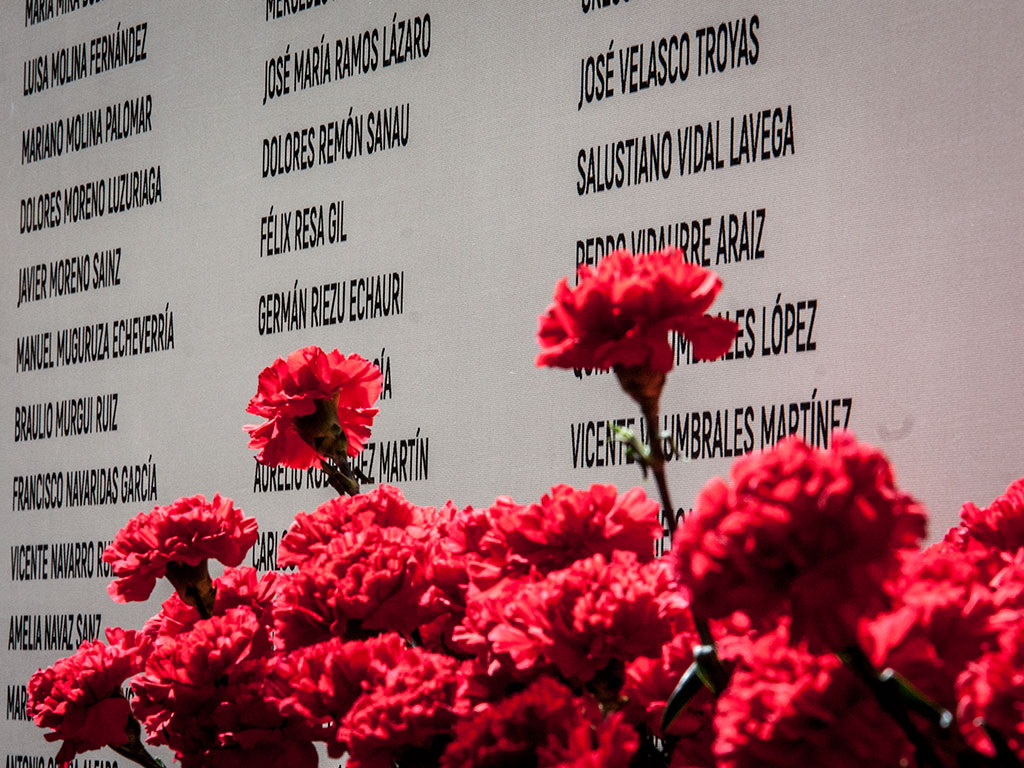
Memorial plaque in Pamplona with the list of teachers murdered and cracked down on in the rearguard of Navarre by the Spanish Nationalists, 1936 and later

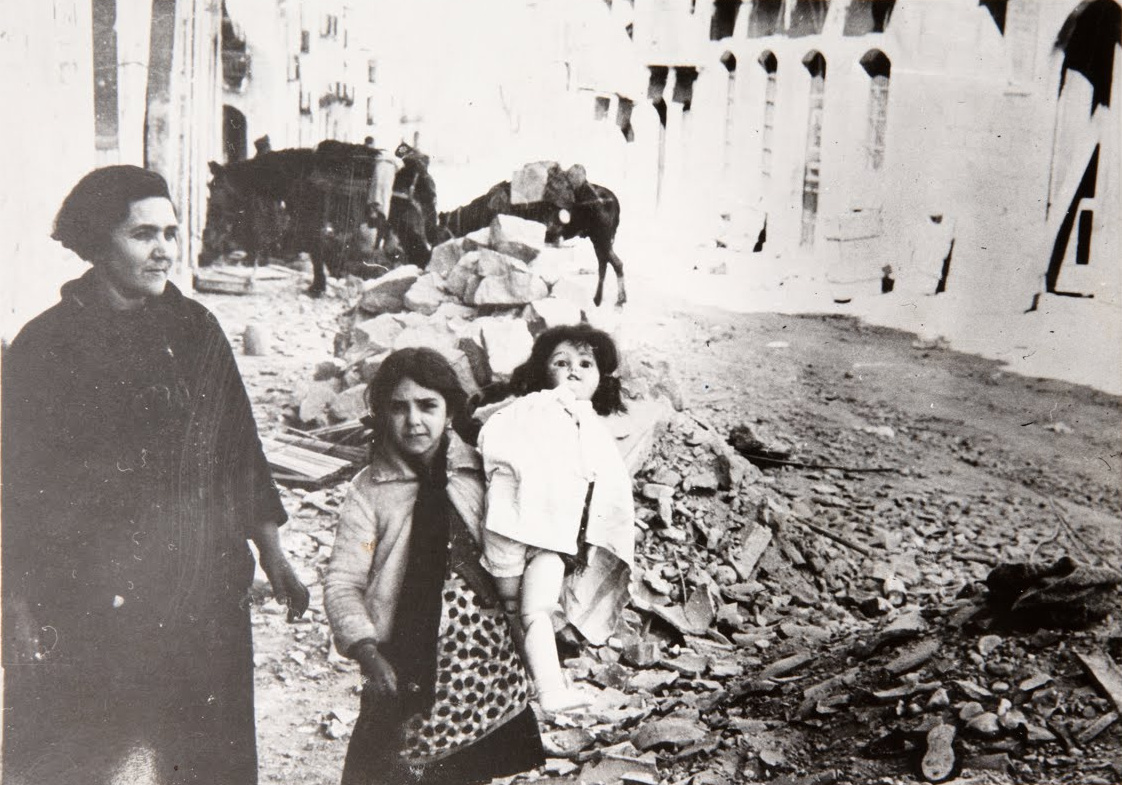
A girl with her doll in 1938 after a bombing

Behind Nationalist lines, all women were forbidden from wearing pants. Instead, women were to wear skirts, which had to be long. Shirts were required to be long sleeved. Rape was so common that many pregnant women did not know who the fathers of their children were. Rape, along with murder and torture, were frequent tools used by Nationalist forces to instill terror in women and keep them in line.

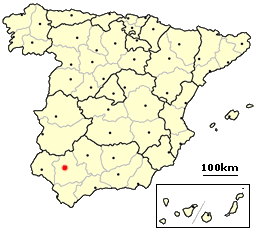
Location of Sevilla, near Constantina and Lora

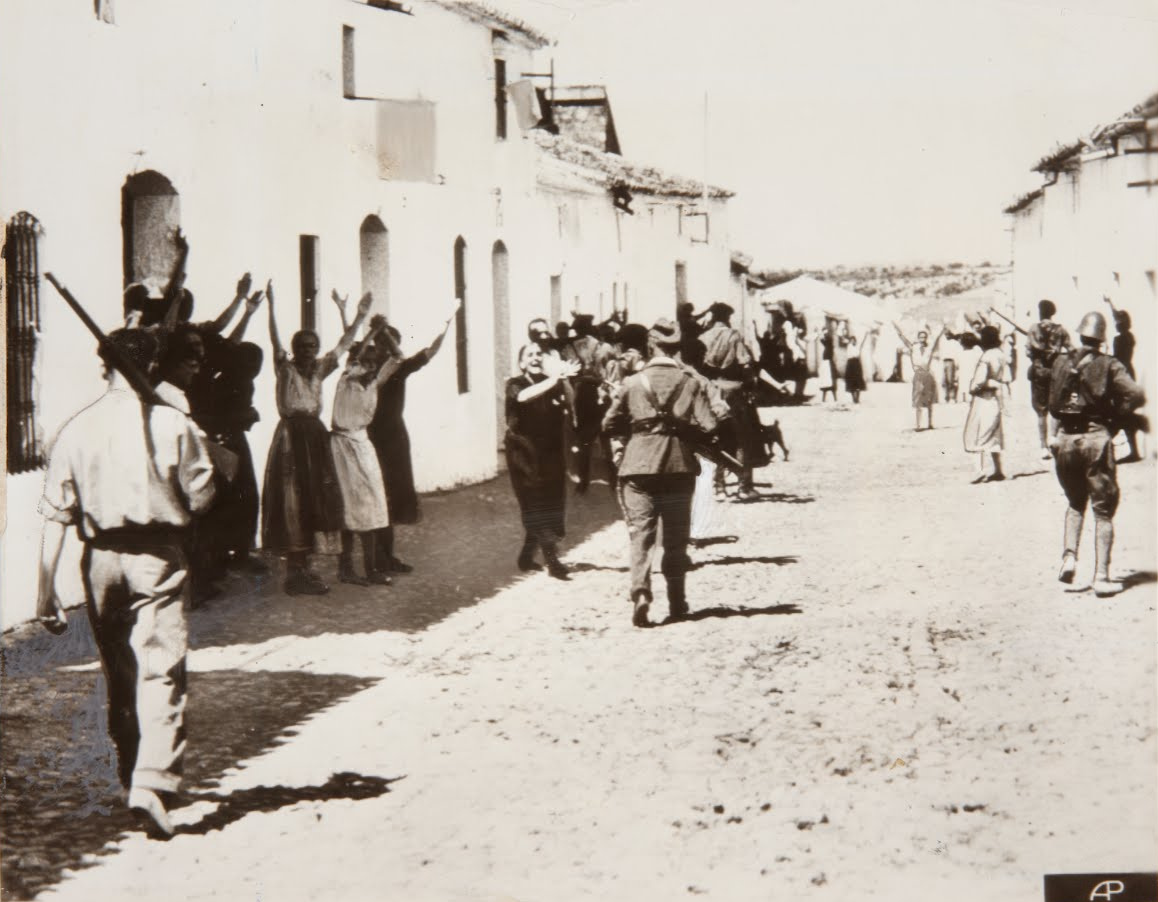
Women pleading with Nationalist forces for lives of prisoners in Constantina, Seville in 1936

When Constantina was taken by Nationalist forces on 7 August, those forces sought revenge for anarchist shooting of Nationalist prisoners. Women who had found themselves widowed recently or who had husbands serving with the Legionaries were raped in a mass orgy event fueled by alcohol provided by local wineries. On 10 August, show trials were held and many women were given death sentences for things like displaying Republican flags, expressing admiration for President Roosevelt or criticizing their employers. Among the women executed were two pregnant girls.

In Lora, where Nationalist forces killed between six hundred and one thousand people, women who survived often had their heads shaved to where just a tuft remained, and that tuft then had a ribbon with monarchist colours tied to it. These women were also often subject to abuse and further humiliation.

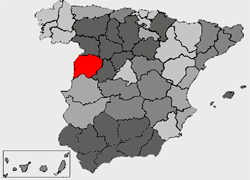
Location of the province of Salamanca

Martín Veloz led a column of Bloque Agrario, Acción Popular and Falange members on a purge of Republican forces in 1937 in villages in the Salamanca area like El Pedroso, La Orbada, Cantalpino and Villoria. Republican men were shot, while Republican women were raped, and then had their heads shaved before being paraded through their villages. The area had not had any major uprising prior to this by Republican forces.

Martín Veloz was part of a group that on 24 August 1937 that murdered twenty-two men and one woman in Cantalpino. Following this, the group then raped many women, and shaved the heads of around one hundred women before making them parade through the streets.

The Moorish troops of General Gonzalo Queipo de Llana were promised the opportunity by the General to rape Republican women. It was not unusual, and turned into a standard practice for captured women to be turned over to these men for abuse as a way of terrifying local populations.

20 women believed to be Republican sympathizers were removed from a maternity ward in Toledo and executed. The Nationalist soldiers then threw their bodies down a nearby well, and proceeded to parade through a local village with the dead women's underwear draped on their rifles.

The Nationalists using rape by Berber forces as a way of bringing women and children into compliance was so problematic, that the British who were scared of allowing Republican refugees in lest they spread the contagion of Communism in the country, finally allowed 3,889 Basque children and 219 female Basque teaches in 1937 to board the Habana and the Goizeko Izarra and head to Britain. The British Government feared being made complicit in rape.

Many Spaniards headed to Gibraltar to tried to seek refuge from the war. The British were largely unwilling to deal with this as most did not want to return to Spain. Still, the British evacuated most Spaniards in Gibraltar to Málaga. On 22 November 1936, they evacuated 157 on the HMS Griffin of which 54 were women and 82 were children. On 27 December 1936, 185 were evacuated on the HMS Gipsy including 16 women and 26 children. On 3 January 1937, 252 people were evacuated on the HMS Gallant including 67 women and 49 children. On 13 January 1937, 212 were evacuated by the HMS Achates of which were 36 were women and 22 were children. Another 536 people were on three other ships where total numbers of women were not recorded.

==== Republican women on the home front ====
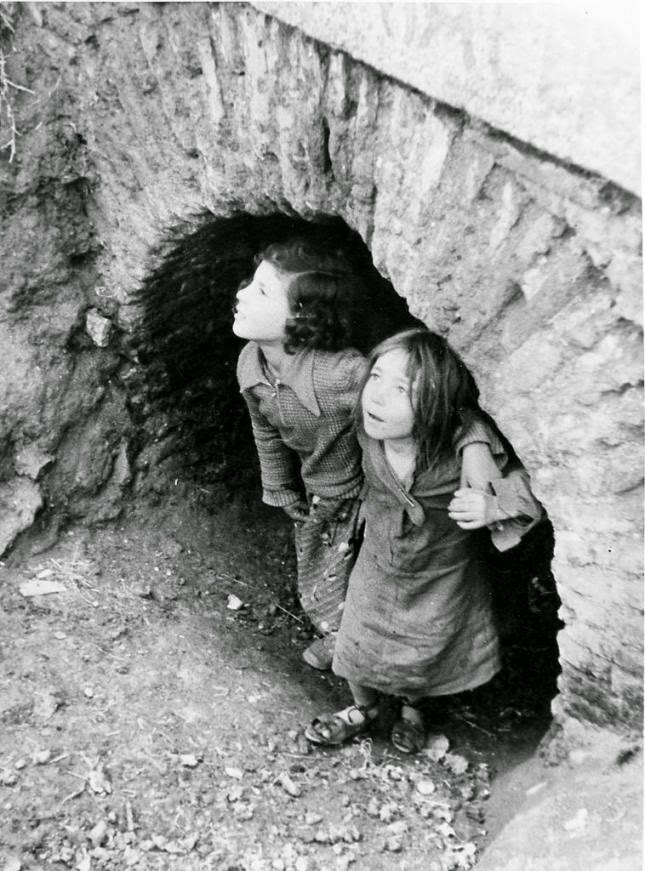
Girls hiding during a Nationalist bombing of Madrid in 1937

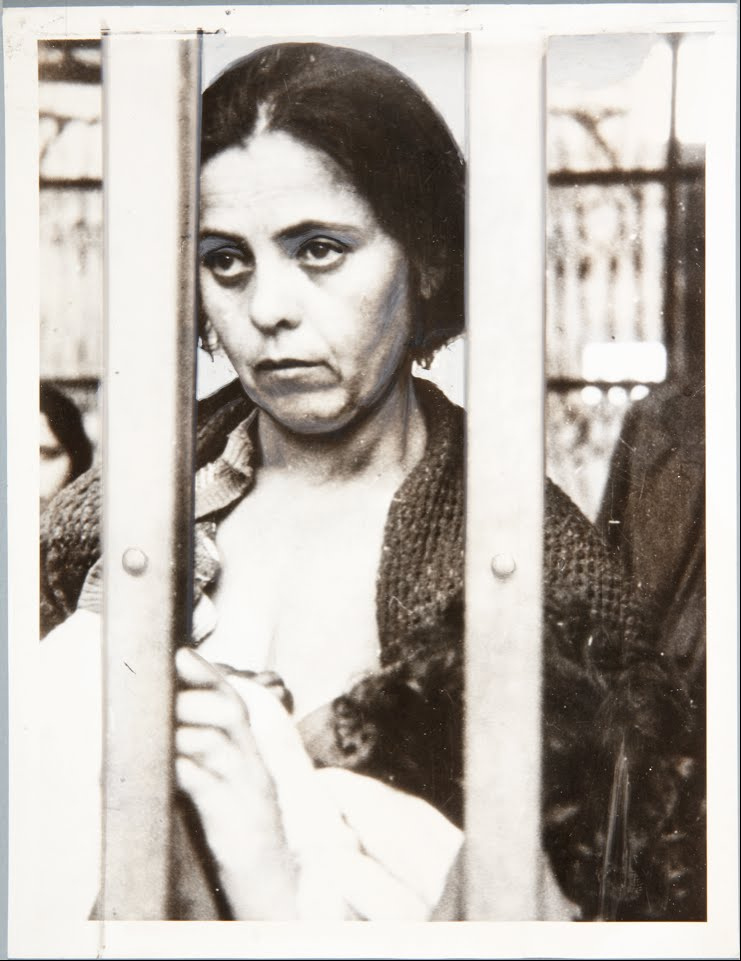
A woman in Barcelona waits during the Spanish Civil War.

Working-class women in Barcelona would often queue for hours for bread in 1937, only to find none was available. This sometimes would lead to rioting, which CNT leadership then worked hard to fault each other over in an attempt to avoid responsibility for the bread shortage. The problem was compounded by the fact that middle and upper-class people in Barcelona were readily buying bread on the black market. One riot occurred on 6 May 1937, when women looted vans full of oranges at the Barcelona port. When this aspect was brought to attention, CNT offered sexist excuses as to why working-class women were unable to buy bread. The result was that ordinary working-class women in the city often turned on anarchist women, and blaming them despite the anarchist women not being involved in CNT leadership. Mujeres Libres, CNT's women's arm, addressed this problem by taking action into their own hands, and staging assaults on markets to provide food for other women. Food riots would become a common feature in Barcelona during the Civil War.

Women were often highly involved with their local agricultural collectives during the war. When the local government tried to confiscate milk from Peñalba, Huesca, women farmers were some of the most vocal in protesting the action.

==== Republican women supporters abroad ====
Much of the aid work on the Republican side by women supporters abroad was done by working-class women. In Scotland, they often utilized strollers and prams to collect donations. Working-class women were also heavily involved in organizing fundraisers in Scotland on behalf of Republicans. These were some of the few positions easily available to them, as they were and continued to be locked out of more overt political and union activity during the war.

=== Women in combat and on the front ===
Because of changes in society, women who wanted to be involved in the fight against fascist forces had two options: they could fight on the front lines or they could serve in auxiliary roles away from the front. Their options were not limited, like that of many women near the battlefields of World War I, where the only available role was that of auxiliary role to support men on the front.

==== Background ====
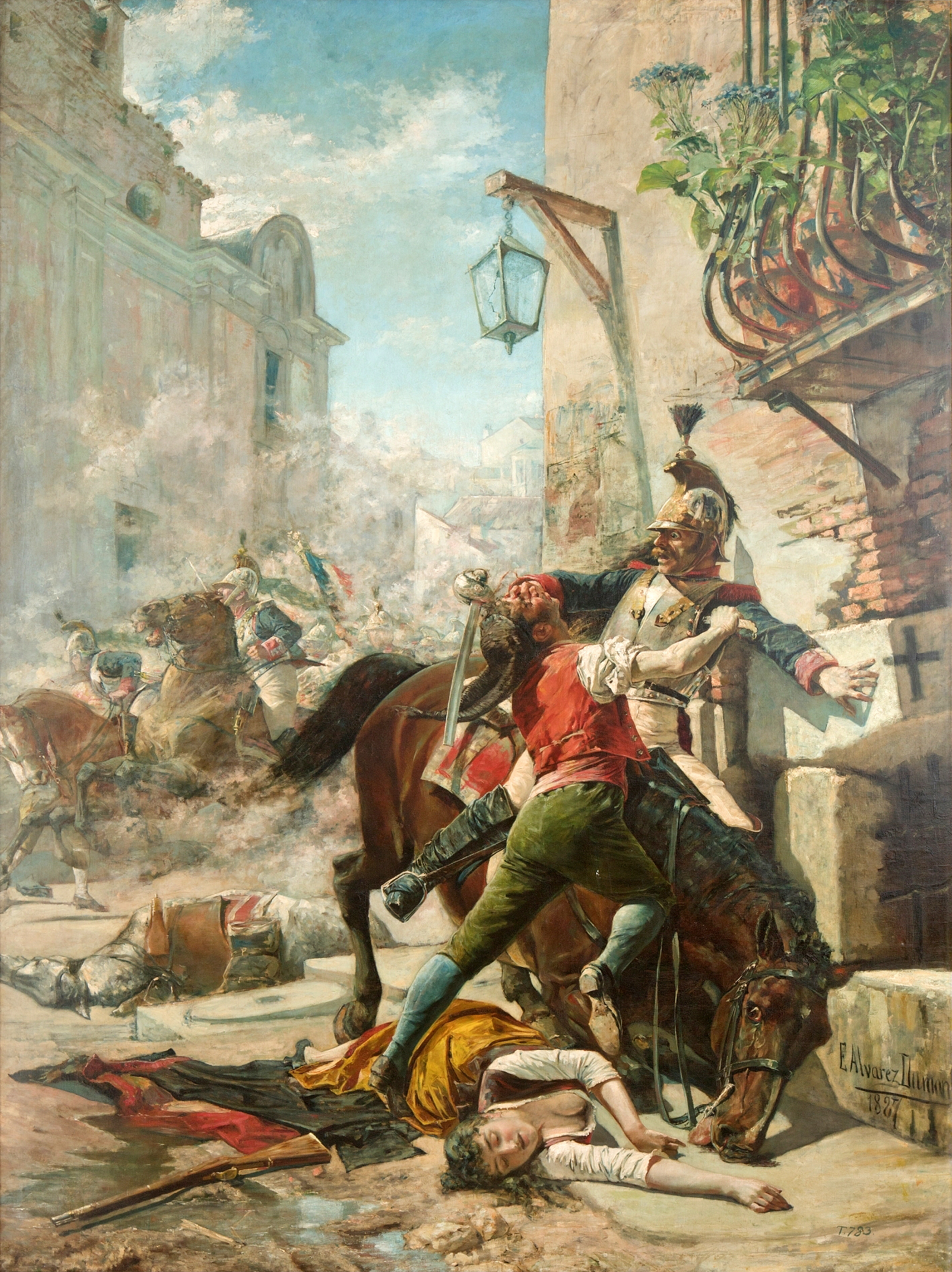
Malasana y su hija by Eugenio Álvarez Dumont. The piece shows moment in which the guerrilla Juan Malasaña kills the French dragon who has just murdered his daughter, the embroiderer Manuela Malasaña, who supplied his father with rifle cartridges to fight French troops from his home during the assault on the Monteleón park.

While women had been sporadically involved in combat in Spain, no large organized force of female fighters (Spanish: miliciana) had been mobilized prior to the Civil War. Notable women who had participated in the past included Napoleon resistance fighter Agustina de Aragón, Manuela Malasaña and Clara del Rey during the Peninsular War and Adia Lafuente, who took part in militant labor action in October 1934 in Asturias. During the Peninsular War, a writer for the La Gaceta de Madrid would ask why the city's women fighters exceeded their men in courage. espite their status as national icons, these women were the exception to the rule about women's roles in war.

In the last half of 1936, milicianas were not considered exceptional; they served as comrades alongside men in separate or mixed gender battalions. This was in large part because many of the milicianas were motivated to fight because their own revolutionary beliefs: they believed their involvement could change the course of the war, and bring about a new revolution in thinking in society.

A few women fought because they were following husbands, fathers or sons into battle. This group though represented a very small minority, with the majority fighting for ideological reasons.

While the national branches of Communist Party supported sending foreign fighters to Spain to fight in the Civil War in the International Brigades, they often opposed their female members from going. When they sometimes agreed to send determined women to Spain, it was often in support roles as reporters or propagandists. The party apparatus in Spain then actively worked to keep women away from the front.

==== Mobilization ====
The Spanish Civil War started on 17 July 1936 with a coup d'état. The military revolt that started the civil war did not immediately succeed in part because of women who took part in spontaneous uprisings.

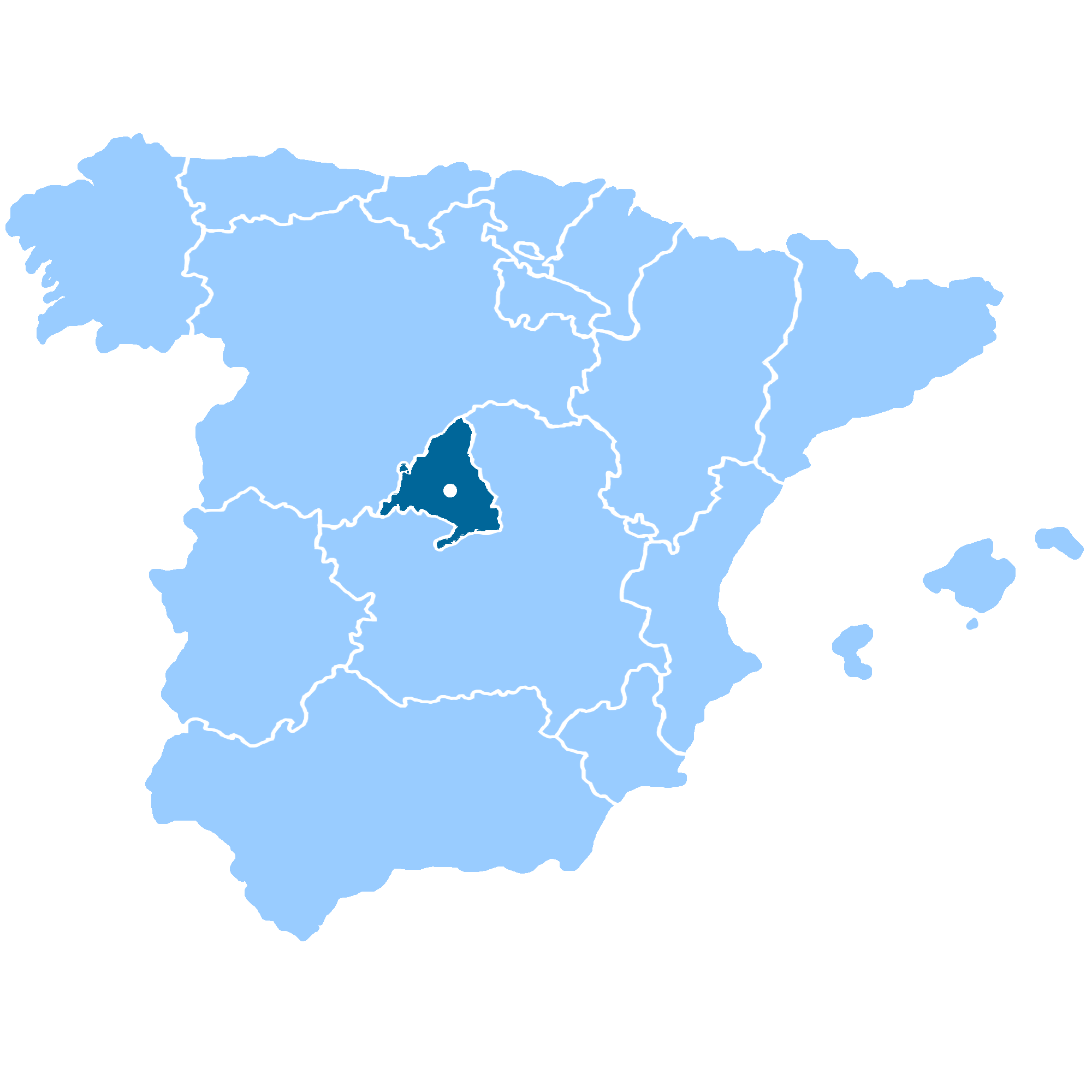
Location of Madrid, Spain's capital city

One of the most important mass mobilizations of women in Spain's history was their participation on the anti-Nationalist front. Shortly after the start of the Civil War, around 1,000 Spanish women volunteered to serve on the front lines of the Republican side. One of the cities that saw the greatest number of armed women rise to its defense was Madrid. This quick mobilization of women was part of the reason that the Nationalists did not gain a quick victory, and the war became a more protracted affair.

Women were called to fight by other women, such as Dolores Ibárruri. In the last days of Republican control of Madrid, she implored both men and women to take to arms against Nationalist forces in the city. The numbers of women mobilized and armed behind the front in support of cities exceeded the numbers who were on the front line. At most, probably 1,000 women fought on the front lines, while several thousand served in city defense. The latter included a women's only battalion that served in Madrid.

Communists and anarchists columns attracted the most women among all the political groups on the Republican front. POUM attracted women fighters, but in smaller numbers. Partido Socialista Obrero Español (PSOE) was one of the only major actors on the left to immediately reject the idea of women participating in combat. The idea was too radical for them, and they believed women should serve as heroes at home, providing support to civilian populations well behind the front lines. Women who were members of PSOE who found their way to combat did so by joining communist and socialist youth groups.

Women also came from abroad to fight as part of the International Brigades, with their total numbers documented at between 400 and 700 women. Many women first traveled to Paris, before going by boat or train to fight. A 1937 agreement designed to stop foreign intervention eventually largely put a stop to recruitment to the International Brigades for both men and women.

The first Spanish Republican women to die on the battlefield was Lina Odena on 13 September 1936. With Nationalist forces overrunning her position, the unit commander chose to commit suicide rather than to surrender. Her death would be widely shared by both Republican and Falangist propagandists. With Nationalist forces threatening her with the potential of being raped by Moorish soldiers if she does not surrender, Republicans were able to cast her as an innocent who chose death rather than to be debased and lose her honor. Falangist propaganda said there was never there and there was never a threat of rape. This made Odena's death meaningless. Beyond that, Falangist propaganda implied Odena had been guilty of murdering a Catholic priest a few weeks prior, with her suicide was a way of escaping punishment.

==== On the front ====
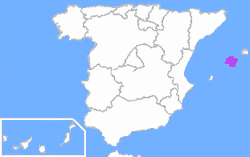
Location of Mallorca, where POUM had a column that included women fighters

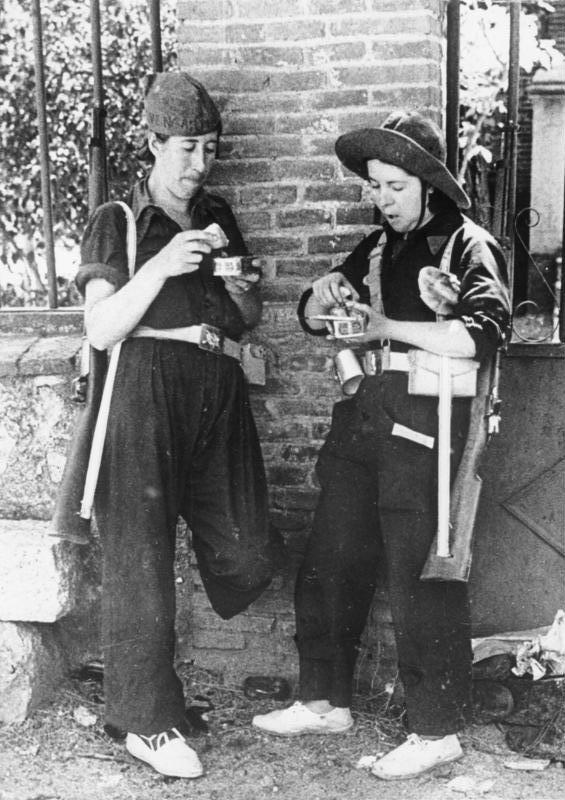
Milicianas with their weapons during the Spanish Civil War

On the front, the norm was for women to serve in mixed gender battalion units. They were transferred around Spain, depending on military needs for troop reinforcements. Rearguard miliciana groups were more likely to be organized into women only battalions, and were more likely to be based in the same location as part of defensive units. As a consequence, the roles played by each tended to be different.

Women on the front often were faced with a duel burden of being expected to fight and to provide auxiliary support. Male leadership decisions to require this reinforced sexism inside the Republic, by allowing women to break free of gender norms by serving in combat but at the same time forcing them to engage in traditionally gendered tasks.

Most of the women serving in front line roles had their positions defined by the communist, anarchist or POUM leadership. Most of these gave women equal roles when it came to combat, and providing the same military contribution. Combat experience did not significantly differ based on the political affiliation of the battalion that women in combat were attached to.

POUM initially required both men and women in combat to also engage in support roles as needed. Women were in the trenches and stood guard. Captain Fernando Saavedra of the Sargento Vázquez Battalion said these women fought just like men.

Fidela Fernández de Velasco Pérez had been trained in the use of arms before the start of the war, and served on the front lines right away outside Madrid. She captured a cannon from Fascist forces, before being transferred to the Toledo front. Her new unit was the same one which Rosario Sánchez de la Mora was serving. There, Fernández de Velasco Pérez fought on the front and sought action by going behind enemy lines to sabotage them alongside other shock troops. She learned how to construct bombs.

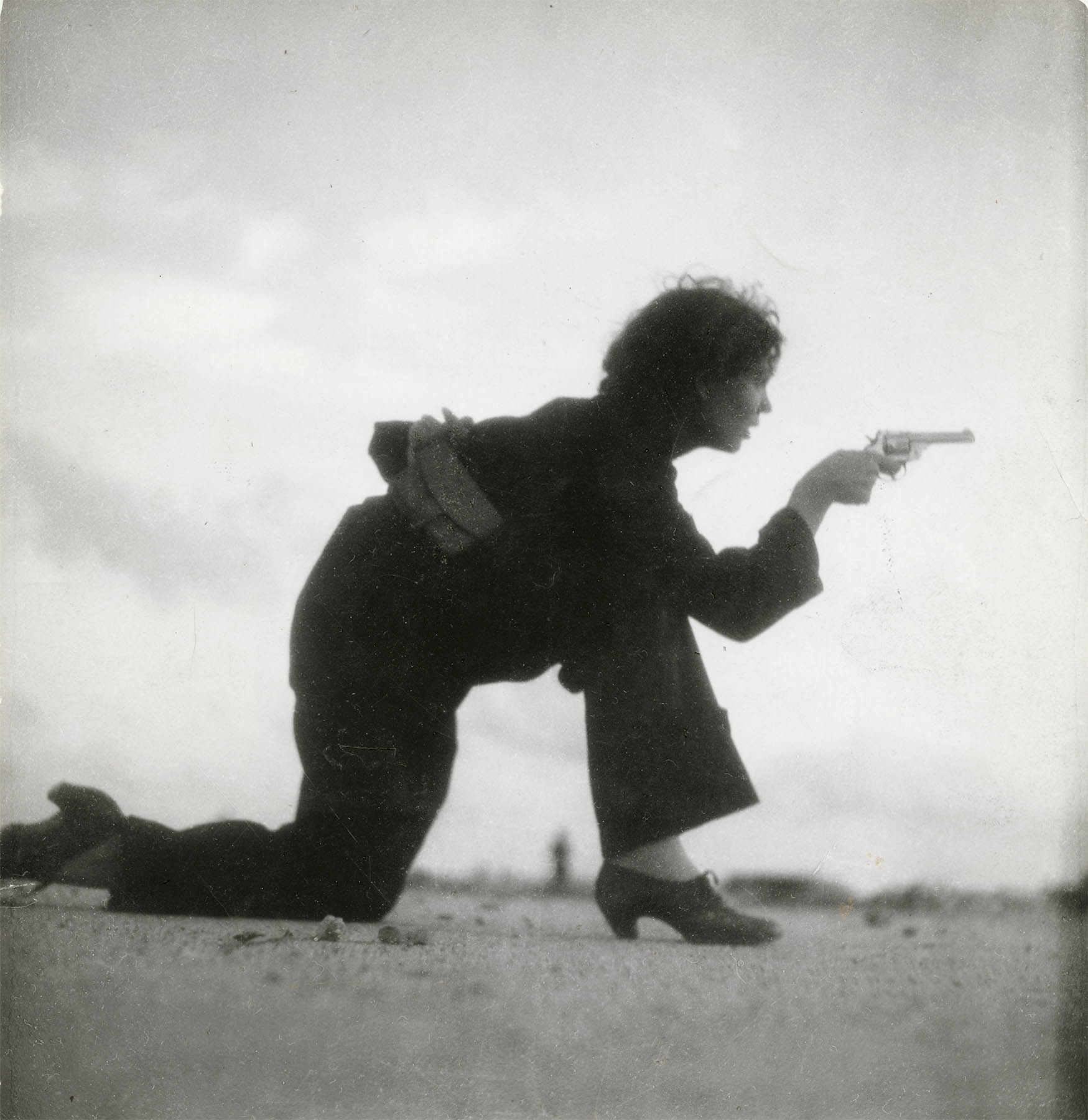
An armed Republican miliciana in 1936 in a photo by Gerda Taro

When the war broke out, Margarita Ribalta was initially assigned by JSU tto a position at headquarters. Unhappy with not being more involved, a few days later she enrolled with a Partido Comunista de España column and was transferred to the front, where she volunteered to be part of an advance group trying to take a hill. She led her group, running between two Nationalist positions while carrying a machine gun. A Republican support plane mistook her group for fascists, bombing them and wounding Ribalta.

In the first days of the war, Trinidad Revolto Cervello was involved in front line combat at the Military Headquarters and at the Atarazanas Barracks in Barcelona. Following that action, she joined Popular Militias and went to the Balaeric Islands, where she again saw front line action at Battle of Mallorca.

Teófila Madroñal was another Spanish woman who served on the front lines. She enlisted in Leningrad Battalion during the first days of the war, underwent weapons training and then was deployed to the Estremadura highway during the Siege of Madrid.

The International Group of the Durruti Column had many women serving in it. Involved in fighting in October 1936 at Perdiguera, a group of these women died. The dead included Suzanna Girbe, Augusta Marx, Juliette Baudard, Eugenie Casteu and Georgette Kokoczinski. The next month, Suzanna Hans of the same group died at the battle of Farlete.

Julia Manzanal became the Political Commissar for the Batallón Municipal de Madrid when she was only 17. From there, she armed herself with a rifle and a pistol, fighting on the front lines, serving as a guard and engaging in espionage role despite having enlisted initially with the role of educating her comrades in Communist ideology.

Women militants and civilians were part of the group that found themselves trapped for four days at the Sigüenza Cathedral as a result of a Nationalist siege in October 1936. After running out of food and ammo, with the walls of the Cathedral beginning to fall from incessant cannon fire, many in the group decided to make a run for it at night. POUM Captain Mika Feldman de Etchebéhère was among those at the cathedral. She was one of the approximately one third of people who fled who survived. Her bravery during the Siege of Sigüenza earned her a promotion to POUM's Lenin Battalion Second Company Captain. After recovering from the siege in Barcelona, she was ordered to Moncloa, where she was in charge of a special shock troop brigade.

Communist women were able to achieve front line leadership roles. 22-year-old Aurora Arnáiz commanded a JSU column during the Siege of Madrid.

One of the few publicly socialist identified women in this period was María Elisa García, who served as a miliciana with the Popular Militias as a member Asturias Battalion Somoza company. She fought with the Battalion at the Lugones front, and later in the Basque mountains. She was killed in combat in the mountains of Múgica on 9 May 1937.

Most women on the front served in militias aligned with some political group. A very small number served as members of the regular Republican army. Members included Esperanza Rodríguez.

Women in the Pasionaria Column of the Fifth Regiment of the Popular Militias often tried to transfer out. This was in part because column leaders often tried to keep women out of combat, and instead have them work in support roles for the column that included cook, and cleaning clothes and dishes. Captains in the Column often tried to force women assigned to the Column out.

Some women in the milicianas cut their hair in case of capture. They did not want their heads shaved except for tufts that would then have Nationalist ribbons put in them and then being paraded around a town near where they were captured.

In comparison to men, women on the front were often more expected to take care of injured comrades. This sometimes put them in more harms way, as some women militia members were shot while tending to injured comrades in battle. Women who had to deal with this situation included Josefa Rionda. Captains might also divert women on the battlefield to hospitals, where they expected them to work alongside nurses.

Foreign observers covering the war often wrote about women's bravery on the front, including saying they took enemy fire better than many of the men they fought alongside. One example of such bravery happened in Cerro Muriano in September 1937, where Republican army forces from Jaén and Valencia fled the front while the small militia force from Alcoy, which included two women, withstood a Nationalist bombardment.

In January 1937 at the Battle of Jarama, Republican forces were near the point of retreating until three Spanish milicianas inspired the men they were serving with to hold fast. The women, manning a machine gun post, refused to retreat.

Nationalists would frequently execute prisoners of war that had been transported to prison. This included executing pregnant milicianas captured in combat.

While most battalions were mixed gendered, the Women's Battalion organized by the PCE and saw combat on the Madrid front was only women. The battalion was called Batallón Femenino del 5th Regimiento de Milicias Populares. Some women who were already serving as nurses as part of the Fifth Regiment returned from the front specifically to join the women's only battalion. Battalion members would sometimes march down Gran Vía in Madrid in groups of two or three since shelling on the street was too heavy to allow them to march in formation.

In September 1936, the Largo Caballero Battalion which included about ten women, fought on the Sierra front. Those in combat included Josefina Vara.

Among the women serving in the international brigades, most worked as nurses, pharmacists or doctors. Some Jewish, Polish and American women did go to Spain, and did serve in combat. They were actively discouraged from doing so by anarchists, and outright banned from doing so by communists.

The threat of rape of female combatants was one used regularly by Nationalist forces to discourage their involvement. It was a very real threat as it happened as a regular feature for both combatant and non-combatant women, with Moorish soldiers being used in some cases to further the debasement of these women soldiers among their battalions and in the wider population. It also served Nationalist forces to remind all women that they were inferior to men, and that men would easily conquer them. Consequently, when women died on the front, their deaths were often treated not as deaths towards a higher purpose, but a personal loss of honor resulting in death.

POUM had a column that included milicianas in the Mallorca campaign.

Argentina García was on the front in October 1937 in San Esteban de las Cruces. The communist's bravery in battle was recognized with a promotion to captain in her Astruias Battalion.

Women's only battalions existed behind the front lines as rearguard support in defense of their cities. Barcelona had such a battalion organized by PSUC. In Mallorca, there was the Rosa Luxemburg Battalion that saw action on the front in defense of the city. Madrid had the Union de Muchachas which served on the front in November 1936 in the Battle for Madrid.

Union de Muchachas was a communist organized rearguard women's only battalion in Madrid that fought on the front line starting on 8 November 1936. The battalion included two thousand women aged fourteen to twenty-five who had been training since July 1936, when the Civil War began. Positioned at Segovia Bridge and near Gestafe on the Carabanchel front and representing the bulk of the Republican forces in those positions, Union de Muchachas fighters were amongst the last to retreat.

Women in rearguard battalions often met daily to practice weapons training, marching and drilling. Many also received specialized training in the use of machine guns.

Women continued to die on the front while in combat. Margaret Zimbal was shot by a sniper in Huesca while attending to an injured comrade.

Franco's treatment of Republican women fighters caught on the front line at times shocked his German allies. He could and did order their execution, and then return to eating breakfast as if nothing special had occurred.

Because women were viewed by some as unnatural participants in battle, women were often suspected of espionage or seeking to betray Republican ideals. They began to become suspect on the battlefield. This paranoia would later play a role in removing women from the front. Milicianas were also suspected of passing along sexually transmitted diseases to men, which resulted in male fighters dying from syphilis. This was perceived as viewing bringing militias into disrepute and harming male readiness for combat.

During the winter of 1936, the Republican government tried to formally convert militias into units in their armed forces. Until this point, women had joined militias affiliated with various political parties and unions.

Lina Odena, Casilda Méndez, Aída Lafuente, Rosario Sánchez Mora, Concha Lozano, and Maruja Tomicoson were all milicianas who would be immortalized by the Republic during this period of active women's involvement in combat.

==== Demobilization ====
There are conflicting accounts by historians as to when the decision was made to remove women from the front on the Republican side. One side dates the decision to late fall of 1936 as the date when Prime Minister Francisco Largo Caballero gave the order. Others date the order to March 1937. What is most likely is that various political and military leaders made their own decisions based on their own beliefs that led to different groups of female combatants gradually being withdrawn from the front. But whatever date ascribed, women were being encouraged to leave the front by September 1936.

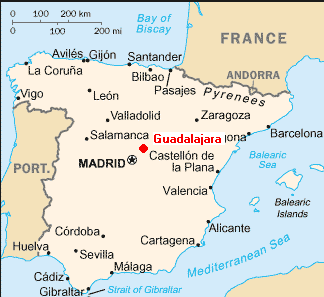
Location of Guadalajara, where women were told to leave the front in March 1937

Women were told to leave the front in Guadalajara in March 1937. Following the battle, many were load into cars and taken to support positions further behind the lines. A few refused to leave, and their fate is uncertain though friends suspected most died in combat. Expelled soldiers included Leopoldine Kokes of the International Group of the Durruti Column. Some demobilized women left the front, and joined women's columns on the home front, in defense of cities like Madrid and Barcelona. When Juan Negrín became the head of the Republican armed forces in May 1937, women's time in combat ended as he continued efforts to regularize Republican forces.

The decision to remove milicianas from the front was one made largely by liberal male Republican leaders. Women on the front did not agree. They saw their removal as a backward step, a return to traditional roles that pre-dated the Second Republic. They viewed this decision as part of a larger symptom of problems for women in society, and did not want to return to the traditional gender roles from which they had used the war to escape. Neither milicianas themselves, nor the men they served with or other actors on the Republican side, launched a protest to their withdraw. The lack of support from male comrades was particularly upsetting for some women as it appeared to them as if they never bothered to try to understand their plight. Consequently, the milicianas just quietly faded away without public protest or awareness.

The removal of women from the front was a continuation of Second Republic policies designed to appeal to conservatives elements within it, who wanted to make the Republic more palatable by less overtly challenging traditional Spanish beliefs about topics such as the role of women. Removing women from the front was just part of a broader late Republican role back of women's rights to appease this base that had actually served to encourage Nationalist forces and ideas in the first place.

==== Media depictions ====
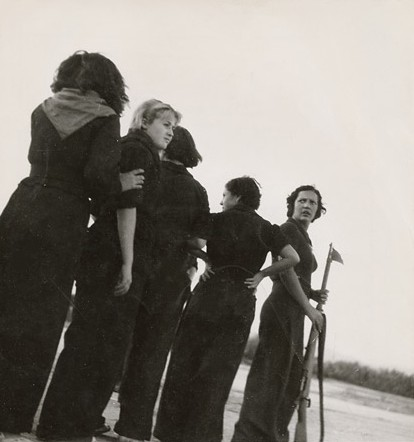
Republican militia women in training during the Spanish Civil War

Republican propaganda about women fell into several broad categories including as a symbol of the struggle, as protective women like nurses, as victims, as representatives of the Republic, as protectors of Spain's rearguard, as carriers of venereal disease, and as combatants.

In the fight against fascism, the militia woman (Spanish: miliciana) served as an important figure for Republican forces in the period between July and December 1936.

Both foreign and domestic media printed images of these female fighters on Spain's front lines as boldly breaking gender norms. Initially, they presented problems for some people in Spain, as the country had very traditional ideas about gender roles. While Republicans became more accepting of them, this started to change yet again by December 1936 when the Government of the Second Republic started using the slogan, "Men to the Front, Women to the Home Front." By March 1937, this attitude had spread to the front lines, where militia women, over their own objections, were withdrawn or placed into secondary roles.

Republican forces used the presence of milicianas as adventurous and sometimes frivolous in their own propaganda. Nationalist propaganda in contract often depicted the miliciana as a prostitute. To some degree, the image in Republican propaganda was one that many milicianas identified with and were complicit in sharing as they had absorbed cultural gender norms in their youth that they continued to perpetuate. At the same time, they often created and shared narratives that highlighted their chastity during the Civil War. When interviewed by the press, many women were offended by questions about their private lives. Rosario Sánchez Mora, La Dinamitera, reacted in anger when interviewed, saying that comparisons to prostitutes hurt her as these women were ready to die for their ideals and ready to die for those who shared in their leftist ideology. Independent Republican media often depicted milicianas not in combat, but in support roles. Many fighters were shown in photos while nursing injured in their battalions, or cooking and cleaning for them.

In contrast to the Republican miliciana, Nationalist propaganda held help the image of the mujer castiza. She was modest, pure, asexual, self-sacrificing and traditional, supporting the Spanish family through work at home. She was the anti-thesis of the Republican fighter in that she was far away from the front and would never be involved in combat.

Following their removal from the front, milicianas and women in general stopped featuring in Republican propaganda. Visually, they returned to their lives before the war, where their primary role was behind the scenes at home. Communists and anarchists columns attracted the most women among all the political groups on the Republican front. Stories about POUM militants became more well known as they were more likely to have published their memories or had better contacts with international media.

In the end, milicianas featured in propaganda published by both sides during the Civil War often served as a symbol of a gendered cultural ideal. Their depictions were often for the male gaze on both sides of the propaganda war. The way there were often drawn as highly sexualized beings made it easy for those on both sides to dismiss them as prostitutes.

=== Death sentences and life in prison ===
==== Nationalist prisons ====
Republican women in prisons often faced situations their male counterparts did not have to deal with. Unlike their male counterparts, many women given death sentences for military rebellion were given the status of common criminals. Some women in Nationalist zones found their husbands arrested and executed because a Nationalist soldier coveted her. Children were removed from their mothers, left in the care of family or to live on the streets. Some women with sons who fought for the Republic were forced to watch them be tortured or executed. Prior to going to prison, some women found themselves raped by male police officers. Some women were removed from prison at night by Falangists who would then rape them. During these nights away from prison by Falangist forces, some women were also branded with a yoke and arrows. Borrowing from a practice being used by Mussolini's forces in Italy, women in prison were often forced to drink castor oil with the intention of giving them diarrhea. The purpose was to humiliate these women when they soiled themselves. Women in prison often had a toilet ratio of one toilet for every 200 women. By the end of the Civil War, the Las Ventas Model Prison had swelled from 500 female prisoners to over 11,000.

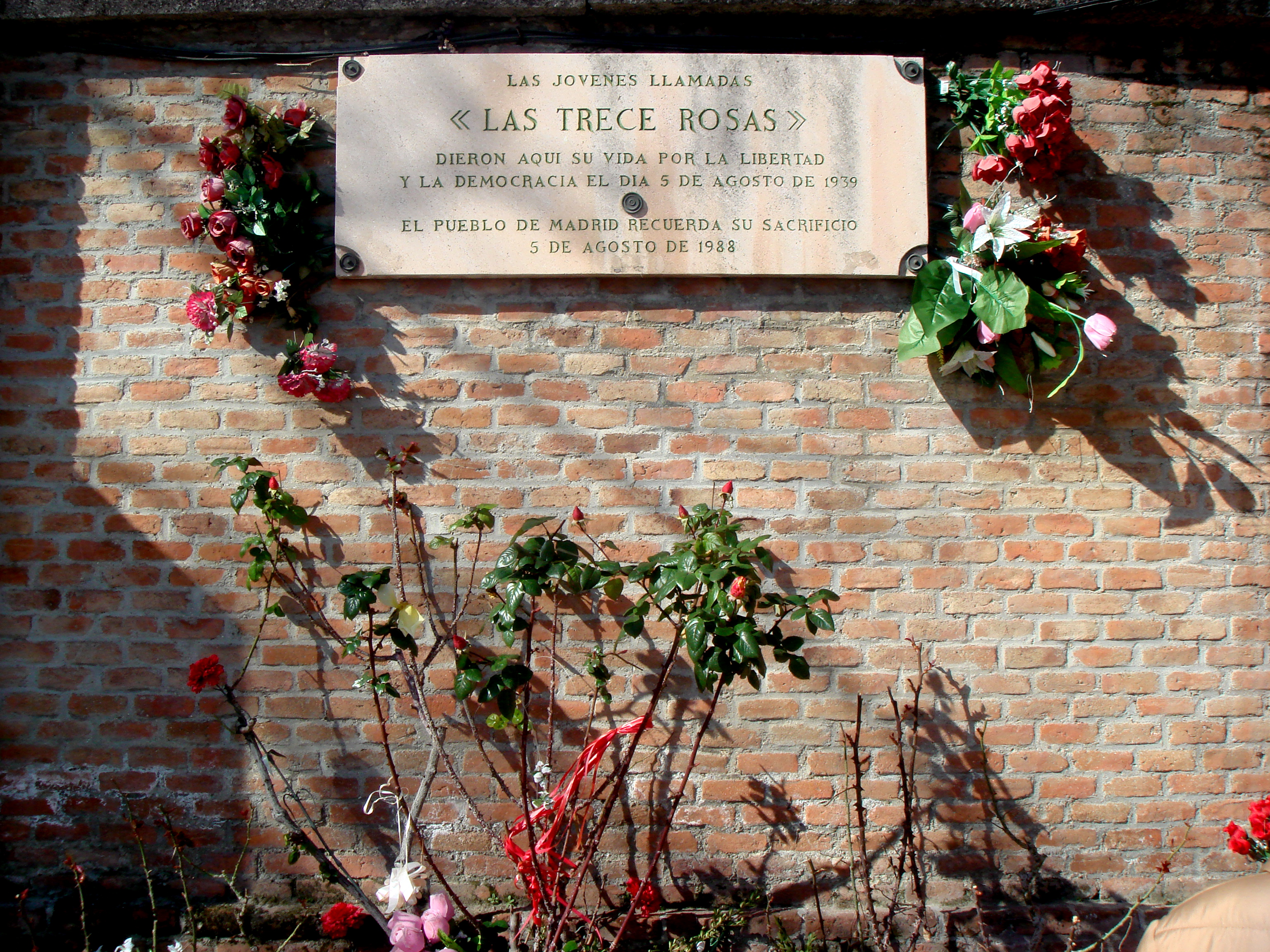
A plaque in the cemetery honoring Las Trece Rosas

Seven girls under the age of twenty-one were executed as part of a larger group of fifty-six prisoners in Madrid on 5 August 1939. The group became known as the Trece Rosas, and had all belonged to the United Socialist Youth (JSU). Casado Junta had gained access to JSU membership roles, and then left them to be found by supporters of Franco. This facilitated the arrest of the Trece Rosas, because the fascist had names and details of JSU members.

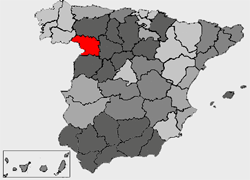
Location of the Province of Zamora in Spain

Pregnancy and nursing babies could not save women from death. In Zamora, death by firing squad was common for these women. Amparo Barayón, who was still nursing, had her eight-month-old daughter removed from her arms and put into a Catholic orphanage on 11 October 1936. The following day, she was executed. Pregnant women with death sentences sometimes had their executions stayed long enough so that they could give birth, with their babies then being stolen by Nationalist sympathizers.

Pregnant women could be subject to beatings and torture. Some were given electric shocks to their nipples, lower genitalia and ears. For those who survived this, they were often plagued with mental illness and headaches that lasted years. Nursing mothers in prison often had to deal with unsanitary conditions and the presence of rats. In some prisons, like Ventas, water for toilets and sinks was turned off. Ten to fifteen infant corpses a day were often found in the Ventas prison, with children dying from meningitis. Julia Manzanal was arrested in Madrid in early 1939, right after she had given birth. As a result, she was allowed to take her infant daughter with her. The baby lived only ten months before succumbing to meningitis.

Older women, including those in their seventies and eighties, who were caught trying to escape to Republican zones could also find themselves being tortured, including with electric shocks.

=== Women's media and writing ===
As the war progressed, more anti-fascists organizations began publishing magazines and newspapers for women to specifically address their needs. This had a flow on effect of increasing women's personal agency.

The Spanish Civil War inspired many works of fiction and non-fiction, written by Spanish and international writers. As a result, it would later be labeled the "Poet's War". While there would be many literary compilations and literary analysis during and following the war of these works, few to none would touch on the work produced by women writers in this period.

Mujeres Libres published a journal of the same name. Writings found in it focused on personal autonomy, the creation of female identities, and self-esteem.

Milicianas on the front often wrote about their experiences for publication in party supported media. One of the main topics they focused on was often inequality on the front, and the expectation that in addition to combat, they would also do support roles like tending to the injured, cooking and cleaning while male colleagues were afforded time to rest.

== Francoist Spain (1938–1973) ==
Women who had been behind Republican lines found themselves locked out from a number of professions just because of where they had lived. This included civil service jobs, teaching positions, journalism jobs, and places in professional organizations.

=== Gender roles ===
The end of the Civil War, and the victory of fascist forces, saw the return of traditional gender roles to Spain. This included the unacceptability of women serving in combat roles in the military. Where gender roles were more flexible, it was often around employment issues where women felt an economic necessity to make their voices heard. It was also more acceptable for women to work outside the home, though the options were still limited to roles defined as more traditionally female. This included working as nurses, or in soup kitchens or orphanages. Overall though, the end of the Civil War proved a double loss for Republican women, as it first took away the limited political power and identities as women they had won during the Second Republic and it secondly forced them back into the confines of their homes.

With strict gender norms back in place, women who had found acceptable employment prior and during the Civil War found employment opportunities even more difficult in the post war period. Teachers who had worked for Republican schools often could not find employment.

Gender norms were further reinforced by Sección Femenina de Falange. Opportunities to work, study or travel required taking classes on cooking, sewing, childcare and the role of women before they were granted. If women did not take or pass these classes, they were denied these opportunities.

=== Role in the family ===
Motherhood became the primary social function of women in Francoist Spain. W Still, while otherhood wplayed this critical societal role it was one the regime only wanted to see perpetuated among those who shared in their political ideology. Children of mothers with leftist or Republican leanings were often removed from their care in order to prevent mothers from sharing their ideology with their offspring.

A law passed on 30 March 1940 meant Republican women could keep their children with them in prison until the child turned three years old. At this point, children were then put into state care to prevent the contagion of Republican thinking from spreading. The number of children removed from Republican mothers between 1944 and 1954 was 30,960. These children were not allowed to remain in contact with their families, and many found themselves in centers run by Auxilio Social. When mothers were released from prisons, they were often watched to make sure they were good mothers as defined by the state. Actively surveiled, many women lost custody of new children they had.

Republican mothers abroad addressed the problem of specifically being targeted by Franco's regime by created the Unión de Mujeres Españoles (UME) in France. The purpose of the organization was to legitimize political activity of mothers as being part of the broader efforts of "female consciousness." UME published a magazine called Mujeres Antifascistas Españolas. The publication linked Republican women in exile with those in Spain, including some who were in prison. It honored women's roles as front line combatants, and suggested the special role of motherhood made their voices more valuable when it came to speaking out against the problems of the Franco regime. This contrasted to Spanish Communist women in exile beliefs, which suggested mothers in this period should fade into the background, serving in roles that supported single women and men who could be more visible in the struggle against Franco. Communists emphasized a traditional view of motherhood espoused by Franco.

=== Feminism ===
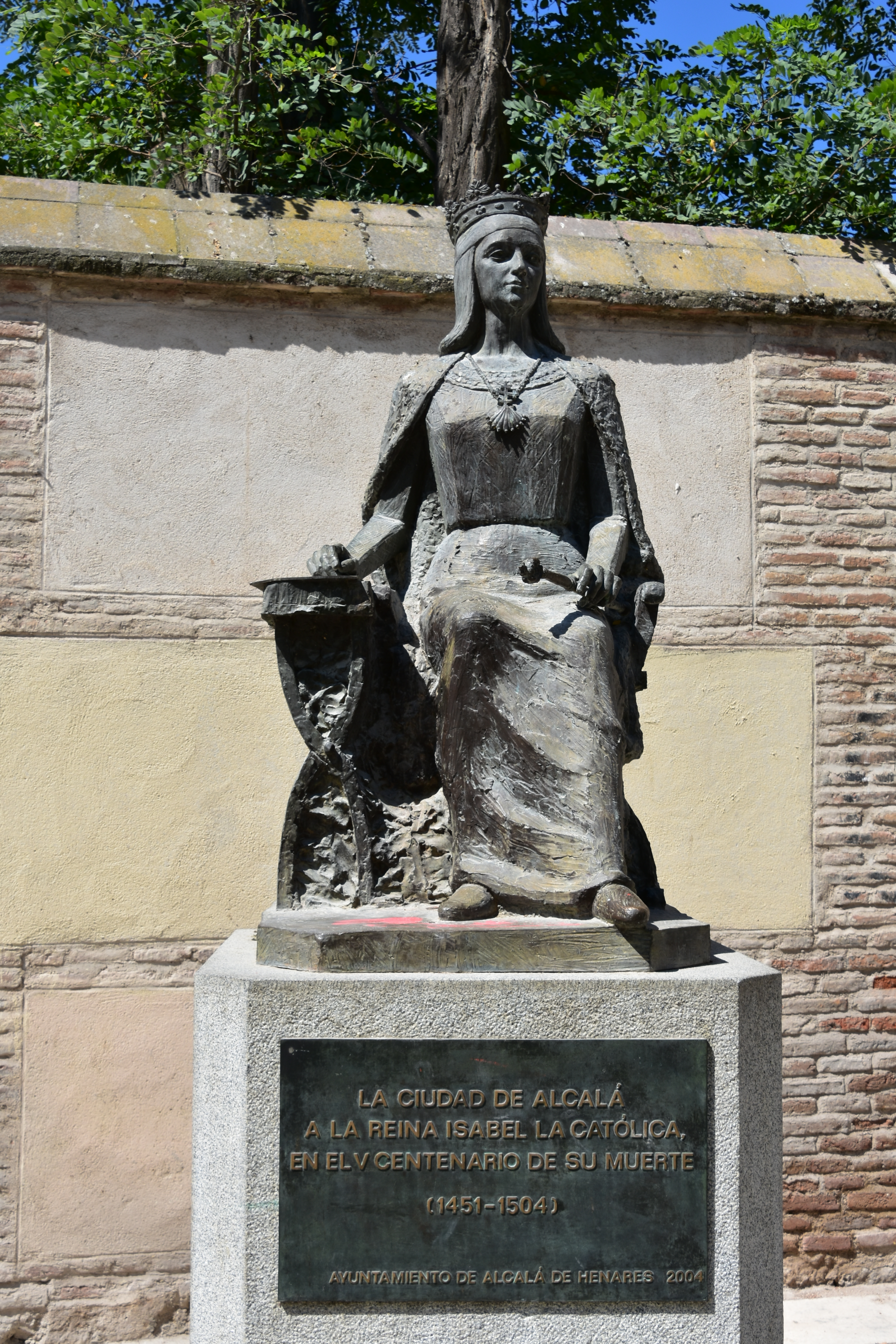
Statue of Isabel the Catholic in Alcala de Henares

Sección Femenina de Falange worked to depict feminism as a form of depravity. It associated feminism with drug abuse and other evils plaguing society. State supported feminism, expressed through Sección Femenina, offered Isabel the Catholic and Teresa of Avila as symbols for Spanish women to look up. They had first been used by Francoist women during the Civil War, and reminded women that their role was to become mothers and to engage in pious domesticity.

=== Women's rights ===
The pillars for a New Spain in the Franco era became national syndicalism and national Catholicism.

Following the Civil War, the legal status for women in many cases reverted to that stipulated in the Napoleonic Code that had first been installed in Spanish law in 1889. The post Civil War period saw the return of laws that effectively made wards of women. They were dependent on husbands, fathers and brothers to work outside the house. It was not until later labor shortages that laws around employment opportunities for women changed. These laws passed in 1958 and 1961 provided a very narrow opportunity, but an opportunity, for women to be engaged in non-domestic labor outside the household.

In March 1938, Franco suppressed the laws regarding civil matrimony and divorce that had been enacted by the Second Republic.

The 1954 Ley de Vagos y Maleante saw further repression directed at women, specifically those who were lesbians. The law saw many lesbians committed, put into psychiatric institutions and given electroshock therapy.

The Franco period saw an extreme regression in the rights of women. The situation for women was more regressive than that of women in Nazi Germany under Hitler. Women needed permission to do an array of basic activities, including applying for a job, opening a bank account or going on a trip. The law during the Franco period allowed husbands to killed their wives if they caught them in the act of adultery.

=== Political organizations and activist ===
==== Communists ====
===== Partido Comunista de España =====
Partido Comunista de España became the dominant clandestine political organization in Spain following the end of the Civil War. It would retain this position until the death of Franco saw PSOE replace it.

Women were involved with the party, helping to organize covert armed resistance by serving in leadership roles and assisting in linking up political leaders in exile with those active on the ground in Spain.

During the later parts of the war and at its conclusion, some women from POUM were coerced into making false confessions in Moscow courtrooms, and then sent to Soviet prisons. Their major crime was being Trotskyites.

It was only during the 1950s and 1960s that some of those women involved with POUM and Trotskyite purged began to re-evaluate their role in them; their change of hearts only occurred after Stalinist Communism lost its prestige among leftist circles.

=== Prison ===
By the end of the war, the Nationalist run women's only Las Ventas Model prison in Madrid had over 14,000 women. Many of these women in prison were raped by guards and were pregnant. This had swollen the size of the prison to include a further 12,000 Republican child prisoners. From there, at the orders of Antonio Vallejo Nágera, these children were removed from their mothers and put into orphanages in order to prevent them being contaminated by "Marxist fanaticism."

María Topete Fernández was part of prison leadership at the Prison for Nursing Mothers in Madrid. Held up as a model for being the first of its kind in Europe, the prison had problems with infant mortality. While the Law of Maternal and Infant Health in June 1941 reduced infant deaths by a small fraction, imprisoned Republican women would not see improved rates until 1943, and significant improvement until 1952 when the prison's rationing system was abandoned.

=== Women veterans ===
The end of the Civil War, and the victory of fascist forces, saw the return of traditional gender roles to Spain. This included the unacceptability of women serving in combat roles in the military. After the war, many milicianas faced difficulties. This included the general population being subjected to a propaganda war that ridiculed their involvement in the conflict. At the same time, the new government sought them out to put them in prison or torture them. Many fighters were also illiterate, and found this to be restrict later activities. This was coupled with restrictions placed on some when in exile in France that limited their opportunities. For those who remained politically active, they had to deal with open sexism in the Communist Party and in anarchist circles.

Some women's veterans of the war never retired. They instead continued active violence against the state as part of communist and anarchist cells, using terrorism like tactics. This included bombing Guardia Civil positions, robbing banks and attacking offices of Falanage. Women involved with this resistance effort included Victòria Pujolar, Adelaida Abarca Izquierdo and Angelita Ramis. These women, and women like them, served as go betweens for exiled leaders in France and those on the ground in Spain. They worked with Communist Party leaders to plan attacks.

=== Exiles ===
Following the collapse of Republic in 1938 and the establishment of recognition of the Nationalist government in February 1939, many women went into exile. Women in refugee camps in France often found themselves in squalid conditions. Pregnant women had few facilities to give birth and they were often poorly suited. Swiss aid worker Elizabeth Eidenbenz arrived to the camps on the frontier in December 1939, and immediately set about improving maternity services. In the period between December 1939 and February 1944, the facilities she helped to establish saw 597 births of Spanish, Polish and Jewish women. Eidenbenz assisted many of the women in getting papers and visas for themselves and their children. Despite better facilities, many things could not be done including cesarian sections. As a consequence, infant mortality rates remained high, with many newborns dying within weeks of their birth.

=== Women's media and writing ===
Margarita Nelken, María Martínez Sierra and Carmen de Burgos had all been pre-Civil War feminist writers. Following the war, their work was subjected to strict censorship.

Spanish feminists in Spain in the post Civil War period often needed to be active in exile. Works produced by these writers including Nada by Carmen Laforet in 1945 and La mujer nueva in 1955, Primera memoria by Ana María Matute in 1960.

Writings of some foreign feminists did find their way to Spain, including the Le deuxième sex published in French in 1947 by Simone de Beauvoir.

Inside Spain, well connected, often aristocratic Spanish feminists were sometimes able to publish their works for domestic consumption by 1948. This includes works by María Lafitte, Countess of Campo Alanaga, and Lilí Álvarez. Works by Republican pre-war feminists like Rosa Chacel and María Zambrano, who continued to write from exile, also saw their works smuggled into Spain.

== Ignored and erased ==
The valuable contributions by Spanish women fighting on the Republican side have been under reported, and women's own stories have frequently been ignored. One of the major reasons for this was the sexism that existed at the time: Women and the problems of women were just not considered important, especially by Francoist victors. When women's involvement in the Civil War was discussed, it was treated as a bunch of stories not relative to the overarching narratives of the war. At the same time, because Nationalist forces won the war, they wrote the history that followed, As they represented a return to traditional gender norms, they had even less reason than Republican forces to discuss the importance of women's involvement on the losing side of the war.

Francoist propaganda actively targeted milicianas, ridiculing their involvement in the war. Many milicianas were imprisoned or tortured, even decades after the war ended. As a result, many of the women who fought during the war were forced to remain silent. The first time Spain's milicianas were discussed openly was in 1989 at a conference about the Civil War in Salamanca.

Another reason the role of Spanish women on the Republican side in the Civil War has been ignored is there is a lack of primary sources. This was a result oftentimes of either fleeing government forces destroying documents or women themselves destroying documents in order to protest themselves. Concealing their own involvement in the war in many cases assisted them in saving their own lives. In other cases, battles themselves resulted in the destruction of valuable documents that discussed women's involvement on the front.
