= Sergi Pàmies =

Spanish writer, journalist, and translator (born 1960)

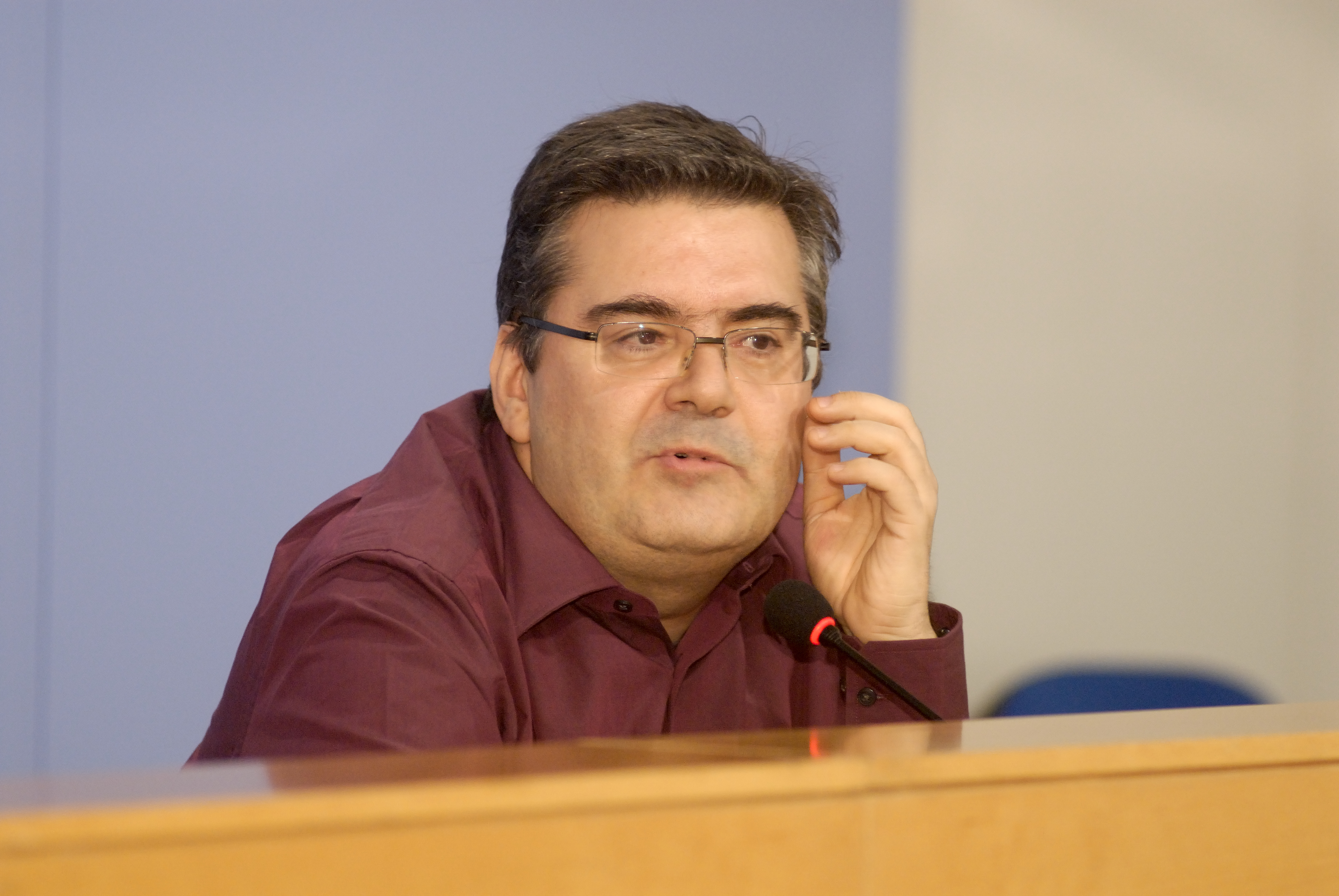
- Sergi Pàmies
- Born: Sergi Pàmies i Bertran; 28 January 1960 (age 66); Paris
- Occupations: Writer, journalist
- Parents: Gregorio López Raimundo (father); Teresa Pàmies (mother)

Sergi Pàmies (Catalan pronunciation: [ˈsɛɾʒi ˈpami.əs]; born 28 January 1960) is a Spanish writer, translator, journalist and television and radio presenter. He is the son of the writer Teresa Pàmies and the former general secretary of the Unified Socialist Party of Catalonia, Gregorio López Raimundo. In his works he employs humor and parody mixing them with themes of failure and desperation. He translated works by Guillaume Apollinaire, Jean-Philippe Toussaint, Agota Kristof, Daniel Pennac and Amélie Nothomb. He received several awards for his literary works.

== Works ==
=== Story collections ===
- T'hauria de caure la cara de vergonya, 1986 (published in English as Losing Face, 1993)
- Infecció, 1987 ('Infection')
- La gran novel·la sobre Barcelona ('The Great Novel About Barcelona'; Crítica Serra d'Or award)
- L'últim llibre de Sergi Pàmies, 2000 ('The Last Book by Sergi Pàmies')
- Si menges una llimona sense fer ganyotes, 2006 ('If You Eat a Lemon Without Making Grimaces'; City of Barcelona award, Lletra d'Or award)
- La bicicleta estàtica, 2010 ('The Stationary Bicycle')
- Cançons d'amor i de pluja, 2013 ('Songs of Love and Rain')
- L'Art De Portar Gavardina, (to be published by Other Press in English as 'The Art of Wearing a Trench Coat', March 2021)
- A les dues seran les tres, 2024

=== Novels ===
- La primera pedra, 1990 (The First Stone; Ícaro award)
- L'instint, 1993 (The Instinct; Prudenci Bertrana Prize)
- Sentimental, 1995 (Sentimental)
