= Teresa Pàmies =

Spanish writer (1919–2012)

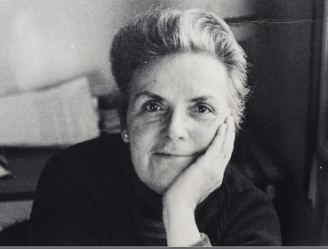
- Teresa Pàmies
- Born: Teresa Pàmies Bertran; 8 October 1919; Balaguer, Lleida, Spain
- Died: 13 March 2012 (aged 92); Granada, Andalusia, Spain
- Occupations: Writer, journalist
- Political party: Unified Socialist Youth of Catalonia; Unified Socialist Party of Catalonia
- Spouse: Gregorio López Raimundo
- Children: 5, including Sergi Pàmies
- Father: Tomàs Pàmies
- Awards: Josep Pla Award (1971); Premi Crítica Serra d'Or de Literatura i Assaig (1972); Creu de Sant Jordi (1984); Premi d'Honor de les Lletres Catalanes (2001); Manuel Vázquez Montalbán International Journalism Award (2007)

Teresa Pàmies Bertran (8 October 1919 – 13 March 2012) was a Spanish Catalan-language writer.

She was leader of the Unified Socialist Youth of Catalonia (1937) and one of the founders of the National Alliance of the Young Woman (1937–1939). Married to Gregorio López Raimundo, General Secretary of the Unified Socialist Party of Catalonia (PSUC), she was the mother of writer Sergi Pàmies.

Prominent among her works, always with an autobiographical background, were Testament a Praga (1970), Quan érem capitans (1974), Va ploure tot el dia (1974), Gent del meu exili (1975), a biography of Dolores Ibárruri in Spanish (Mexico, 1975), and Jardí enfonsat (1992). In 1984 she received the Creu de Sant Jordi awarded by Generalitat de Catalunya autonomous government. In 2000 she received the gold medal for artistic merit of the City Council of Barcelona. In 2001 she was awarded the Premi d'Honor de les Lletres Catalanes, and in 2007 she received the Manuel Vázquez Montalbán Award.

== Biography ==
Teresa Pàmies was born in Balaguer, Noguera district in 1919. The daughter of Tomàs Pàmies, local leader of the Workers and Peasants' Bloc (BOC), at age 10 she was selling the BOC's weekly, La Batalla. At 17, when the Civil War began, she took part in a rally in the Monumental Plaza of Barcelona, and in 1937 she joined the Unified Socialist Youth of Catalonia (JSUC), of which she would become leader. She also participated in the creation of the National Alliance of Dona Jove (1937–1939) and wrote for the bulletin Juliol.

With the Republican defeat, she marched into exile with her father, leaving her mother and brothers in Balaguer. The experience of leaving the wounded of Barcelona's Vallcarca Hospital, which she told of in her book Quan èrem capitans (1974), would not leave her. She joined the half million people fleeing from Catalonia to France, a march that in her case passed through Girona and Olot until, at 19, she entered the Magnac-Laval refugee camp, near Limoges. There she participated in the organization of internees and the creation of a school until, with the help of her party, she managed to flee. In Paris prior to the German occupation, she was imprisoned for three months in La Roquette as an illegal immigrant. Once released, she went to Bordeaux to join the Republicans who traveled to the Dominican Republic of Rafael Trujillo. Then she went to Cuba, where she heard about the execution of President Lluís Companys, and from Cuba she traveled to Mexico. In Mexico, she established her residency for eight years and studied journalism at the Universidad Femenina. In 1947 she managed to return to Europe, first spending one year working at Radio Belgrade, and then twelve in Czechoslovakia. There she worked as editor of the Catalan and Spanish broadcasts of Radio Prague. From exile she contributed to the Catalan magazines Serra d'Or and Oriflama.

In 1971 she returned to Catalonia thanks to a visa to receive the Josep Pla Award for the book Testament a Praga, written jointly with her father.

Teresa Pàmies died on 13 March 2012 at age 92 at the home of her son Antonio in Granada.

== Works ==
- Testament a Praga 1970)
- Quan érem capitans (1974)
- Va ploure tot el dia (1974)
- Quan èrem refugiats (1975)
- Si vas a París papà... (1975)
- Gent del meu exili (1975)
- Gent de la vetlla (1975)
- Los que se fueron (1976)
- Dona de pressa (1975)
- Amor clandestí (1976)
- Aquell vellet senzill i pulcre (1977)
- Vacances aragoneses (1979)
- La chivata (1981)
- Memòria dels morts (1981)
- Aventura mexicana del noi Pau Rispa (1982)
- Matins d'Aran (1982)
- Rosalia no hi era (1982)
- Busqueu-me a Granada (1984)
- Segrest amb filipina (1986)
- Praga (Collection "Las ciudades", Ed. Destino) (1987)
- Primavera de l'àvia (1989)
- Jardí enfonsat (1992)
- Coses de la vida a ritme de bolero (1993)
- Nadal a Porto (1994)
- La filla del Gudari (1997)
- La vida amb cançó: cròniques radiofòniques (1999)
- Estem en guerra (2005)
- Ràdio Pirenaica (2007)
- Inform al difunt (2008)
