= Pepita Inglés =

Spanish politician and anarchist (1910–1937)

- Born: 1910; Cartagena, Spain
- Died: 18 April 1937 (aged 26–27); Sierra de Alcubierre
- Known for: Anarcho-syndicalist fighter, member of the Durruti Column during the Spanish Civil War

Pepita Inglés (1910 – 18 April 1937) was an anarcho-syndicalist fighter and member of the Durruti Column during the Spanish Civil War. Her code name was Rosario. She died on the Aragon Front in 1937 in a confrontation with fascist troops.

== Early life ==
Pepita Inglés was born in Cartagena, Spain in 1910. She had little schooling, having to go to work at a young age but was keen to educate herself. She moved to Barcelona with her partner, Mariano Sanchez, and the couple had two children.

== Spanish Civil War ==
Inglés took part in street battles from the very beginning of the Spanish Civil War, following the nationalist uprisings of July 1936.

On 24 July, Inglés and Sanchez joined the Durruti Column to fight on the Aragon Front, leaving their children in Barcelona to be cared for by family. Known as Columna Durruti in Spanish, the column was a military unit composed of c. 6000 men and women, the largest anarchist column formed during the Spanish Civil War. Led by Buenaventura Durruti, it became the most recognised and popular military organisation fighting against Franco in the early stages of the war. It was seen as a symbol of the Spanish anarchist movement and its aims to create an egalitarian society through both individualism and collectivism. On 19 July, she took part in the fighting on the streets of Barcelona and on the 24th she left with the Durruti Column for the Front of Aragon, marching with other women such as Palmira Jul, Azucena Haro and Émilienne Morin. She became friends with Durruti's secretary, Pilar Balduque.

When the Durutti column reached the road leading to Pina de Ebro, the fascists bombed them from the air and Sanchez was killed. At this point some of the members of the militia decided to return to Barcelona but Inglés chose to remain and joined the tank corps of the Column, driving armoured vehicles. Lola Iturbe recorded that "Pepita was tiny and very lively". Known by the codename "Rosario", a report by the Civil Guard in Pina described her as "she has glasses, is dark, small and plump".

Inglés took part in the battles of Perdiguera (Zaragoza) and in the mountains of Villafría (Burgos) and later fought in the attempt to capture Quinto (Zaragoza) on 19 November 1936.

In April 1937, she was part in the attack on the Santa Quiteria hermitage, a strategic point at the top of the Sierra de Alcubierre mountain range that controlled communications with Tardienta in Huesca).

Advancing in front of the main body of the column, Inglés came across a group of Francoist soldiers who shouted to her that they wanted to change sides and desert. She approached them but it was a ruse and she was captured and driven back to the enemy lines at bayonet point.

Her comrades in the column were unable to rescue her. Atrocities were regularly committed against prisoners of war and women in the Spanish Civil War were frequently subjected to rape and torture when captured or imprisoned. Lola Iturbe recorded that one of comrades, realising the torture and death that awaited her, ran towards the fascist parapet and threw a bomb. When the smoke cleared, he, the fascist soldiers and Inglés were dead.

An alternative version of Inglés' final moments was recorded in his memoirs by Edi Gmur, a Swiss militia man in the column who wrote that Inglés "the only woman fighting at the time in his military unit" was taken prisoner on 18 April 1937 having stood in front of the rifles of her comrades, when they heard the fascist soldiers shouting. Her comrades did not trust the situation and wanted to shoot and the rebels took advantage of the situation to shoot her and take her prisoner. The next day, a deserter brought the news of Inglés' execution and her glasses. He reported that she had been ordered to shout "¡Arriba España!", but shouted "¡Sois unos hijos de puta!" (you sons of bitches) at the fascist officers, and was shot at that moment.

== Bibliography ==
- Gonzalo Berger; Tània Balló (2022). Les combattantes. Syllepse. p. 300. ISBN 979-10-399-0056-0.
- Lola Iturbe, La mujer en la lucha social y en la Guerra Civil de España, Editores Mexicanos Unidos, México, 1974, 220 p. OCLC 4743450.
