= Lola Iturbe =

Spanish anarcho-syndicalist (1902–1990)

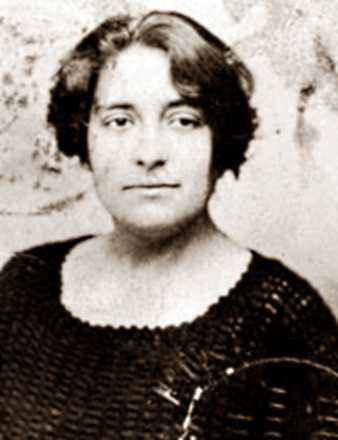
- Born: Dolores Iturbe Arizcuren; 1 August 1902; Barcelona, Spain
- Died: 5 January 1990 (aged 87); Xixón, Asturias, Spain
- Occupation: Journalist
- Organization: National Confederation of Labour
- Movement: Anarchism in Spain

Dolores "Lola" Iturbe Arizcuren (1 August 1902 – 5 January 1990) was a Spanish anarchist activist and journalist. She was the editor of Tierra y Libertad and a close collaborator of the Mujeres Libres organisation, although she was never herself a formal member. After fleeing Spain into exile, she became a key primary source on women in the Spanish Civil War.

== Biography ==
Lola Iturbe was born in 1902, in the Catalan capital of Barcelona, where she was raised by her single mother. At a young age, during the Tragic Week of 1909, she observed women taking part in political demonstrations, burning churches and blocking trains to prevent the transportation of soldiers to Morocco. When she was only 9-years-old, she began an apprenticeship as a seamstress and worked long hours for low pay. Through her mother, she met several members of the anarchist movement, and at the age of 14, she joined the National Confederation of Labour (CNT), an anarchist trade union centre. She soon met Juan Manuel Molina, who became her partner, and together they edited the newspaper Tierra y Libertad. She wrote for the paper under the pseudonym "Kiralina". In December 1935, Iturbe introduced a women's column to the newspaper. Iturbe believed that the abolition of private property and the establishment of anarchist communism would inevitably lead to the emancipation of women and the extension of free love.

In 1936, she informed Mercè Comaposada of the existence of a women's group in Barcelona, which soon became the Catalan branch of the Mujeres Libres. She supported the establishment of the anarchist women's organisation, although she did not become a member herself. She said she did not want to become a feminist, as she wanted to fight as a woman alongside men. Nevertheless, she frequently collaborated with the organisation, which during the early months of the Spanish Civil War, organised women in the rearguard to contribute to the war effort. She recalled that the organisation grew to gain 38,000 members, who together established vocational schools for women, child care facilities and agricultural cooperatives. They proposed that women constitute an industrial reserve force and be given freedom of movement, that vocational schools for women and nurseries for their children be established, and that women be released from domestic labour. These proposals were later taken up by Republican politicians and political parties, but not until after the war had already turned in the favour of the Nationalists. In 1937, she reported that, when militiawomen were recalled from the frontlines, the order was applied inconsistently; she described anarchist women being forced to return to the rearguard, while communist militiawomen were permitted to remain on the frontlines. According to Iturbe, there were only two exceptions: Mika Feldman de Etchebéhère and Pepita Urda, who were both incorporated into the Spanish Republican Army as captains.

After the Nationalist victory, Iturbe fled into exile, where she was one of the first people to write about the role of women in the Spanish Civil War. After returning to Barcelona following the Spanish transition to democracy, in November 1981, she gave an interview with the Irish historian Mary Nash about the role of women in the civil war. She also met the American historian Martha Ackelsberg, who was writing about the Mujeres Libres, and informed her that Mercè Comaposada was living in Paris. Iturbe died in the Asturian city of Xixón on 5 January 1990.

== Selected works ==
- La Mujer en la Lucha Social. La Guerra Civil de España (Mexico, 1974)

== Bibliography ==
- Ackelsberg, Martha A. (2005) [1991]. Free Women of Spain: Anarchism and the Struggle for the Emancipation of Women. AK Press. ISBN 1-902593-96-0.
- Alexander, Robert J. (1999). The Anarchists in the Spanish Civil War. London: Janus Publishing Company. ISBN 978-1-85756-400-6.
- Lines, Lisa Margaret (2012). Milicianas: Women in Combat in the Spanish Civil War. Lexington Books. ISBN 978-0-7391-6492-1.
- Nash, Mary (1995). Defying Male Civilization: Women in the Spanish Civil War. Arden Press. ISBN 0-912869-15-1.
- Ruiz, Laura (2010). Free Women (Mujeres Libres): Voices and Memories for a Libertarian Future. Sense Publishers. ISBN 978-94-609 1-087-6.
- Soriano Jiménez, Ignacio C. (2022). "Dolores Iturbe Arizcuren". Historia Hispánica (in Spanish). Royal Academy of History.
