= Winter Aid =

Irish musician

Shane Culloty, known by the stage name Winter Aid, is an Irish musician.

== Career ==
Culloty grew up in Kerry, Ireland.

In 2013 he released his debut EP as Winter Aid, titled "The Wisp Sings". The title track would grow to become a sleeper hit, becoming a "viral sensation" with over 300 million streams on music services, and over a billion plays on TikTok. The song also featured on multiple television shows. Full-length album "The Murmur of the Land" would follow in 2017, with "The Night is an Ocean" as lead single.

In 2023, Winter Aid released "The Wisp Sings" on vinyl for the first time, with an accompanying digital edition. This was followed by an EP, Inner Sunset, released in early 2024.
