= Calzada =

Calzada or La Calzada may refer to:

== Places ==
=== Spain ===
- La Calzada de Béjar, a municipality in the province of Salamanca
- Calzada de Calatrava, a municipality in the province of Ciudad Real
- Calzada de Don Diego, a municipality in the province of Salamanca
- Calzada de Oropesa, a municipality in the province of Toledo
- Calzada de Valdunciel, a municipality in the province of Salamanca
- Calzada de los Molinos, a municipality in the province of Palencia
- Calzada del Coto, a municipality in the province of León
- Cabezabellosa de la Calzada, a municipality in the province of Salamanca
- Puebla de la Calzada, a municipality in the province of Badajoz
- Rabé de las Calzadas, a municipality in the province of Burgos
- Santo Domingo de la Calzada, a municipality in La Rioja
- Torrejón de la Calzada, a municipality in the Community of Madrid
- Valdelacalzada, a municipality in the province of Badajoz

=== Latin America ===
- Calzada (mountain), a mountain in the Bolivian Andes
- Calzada, Maunabo, Puerto Rico, a barrio in Maunabo, Puerto Rico
- Calzada District, Moyobamba, Peru
- Calzada Larga, Panama
  - Calzada Larga Airport, Panama
- Rafael Calzada, Buenos Aires, Argentina
- La Calzada, a street in Granada, Nicaragua

=== Asia ===
- Calzada, Taguig, a barangay in Taguig, Philippines

== People with the surname ==
- Dominic de la Calzada (1019–1109), Spanish saint
- Humberto Calzada (1944–2025), Cuban-American artist
- José Calzada (born 1964), Mexican politician
- Juan Ismael Calzada, Mexican botanist
- Marco Antonio Calzada (born 1964), Mexican politician
- Maximiliano Calzada (born 1990), Uruguayan footballer
- Paz de la Calzada, Spanish-born American visual artist
- Ricky Calzada (born 1953), Puerto Rican basketball player
- Rocío Colette Acuña Calzada (born 1982), Mexican singer
