= Moríñigo (disambiguation) =

Moríñigo is a municipality located in the province of Salamanca, Castile and León, Spain.

It may also refer to:

- Gustavo Morínigo (born 1977), Paraguayan footballer
- Gustavo Atilano Florentín Morínigo (born 1978), Paraguayan footballer
- Higinio Morínigo (1897–1983), Paraguayan military officer, politician and dictator
  - General Higinio Morínigo, a town named after him
- Marcos Morínigo (1848–1901), former President of Paraguay
