= Santi Quirico e Giulitta (disambiguation) =

Santi Quirico e Giulitta is a church in Rome named for Saints Cyricus and Julitta.

Santi Quirico e Giulitta may also refer to the following churches in Italy:

- Santi Quirico e Giulitta, Capannori, Lucca, Tuscany
- Santi Quirico e Giulitta, Siena or San Quirico in Castelvecchio, Tuscany
- Santi Quirico e Giulitta (Genoa), Liguria
