= Parada de Rubiales =

- Municipality
- Coat of arms

- Location in Salamanca

- Location in Spain
- Coordinates: 41°08′50″N 5°26′03″W
- Country: Spain
- Autonomous community: Castile and León
- Province: Salamanca
- Comarca: La Armuña

Government
  - Mayor: Pascual García (People's Party)

Area
  - Total: 32 km^{2} (12 sq mi)
- Elevation: 847 m (2,779 ft)

Population (2025-01-01)
  - Total: 237
  - Density: 7.4/km^{2} (19/sq mi)
- Time zone: UTC+1 (CET)
  - Summer (DST): UTC+2 (CEST)
- Postal code: 37419

Parada de Rubiales is a village and municipality in the province of Salamanca, western Spain, part of the autonomous community of Castile-Leon. It is located 28 kilometres (17 mi) from the provincial capital city of Salamanca and has a population of 270 people.

== Geography ==
The municipality covers an area of 32 km^{2} (12 sq mi).

It lies 847 metres (2,779 ft) above sea level.

The postal code is 37419.

== Economy ==
- The basis of the economy is agriculture.

== Culture ==
- The festival of San Blas - 3 February
- The festival of San Quirico - 16 June

== San Blas ==
It is a celebration held on February 3, with reference to San Blas. This party, is shorter than San Quirico.

== San Quirico ==
This festival, held on June 16 and attracts many people, refers to the patron San Quirico. The festival, to be in the summer, the heat received from many people, and people, increasing its total number of people these days.

== See also ==
- List of municipalities in Salamanca
