= San Quirico =

San Quirico may refer to:

- Saint Quiricus (fl. 304), an early Christian martyr
- San Quirico, Sorano, a village in Tuscany, central Italy, administratively a frazione of the comune of Sorano, province of Grosseto
- San Quirico d'Orcia, a comune in the Province of Siena in the Italian region Tuscany
- San Quirico Martire, a Roman Catholic church in the frazione of Bolano, Salerno, Italy
- San Quirico, Spain

== See also ==
- Quirico
- Saint-Cyr (disambiguation)
