= Quirico =

Quirico may refer to:

People

- Quiricus and Julietta, Catholic saints
- Quirico Bernacchi (1914–2006), Italian racing cyclist
- Quirico Filopanti (1812–1894), Italian mathematician
- Quirico Pignalberi (1891–1982), Italian Roman Catholic priest
- DeWayne Quirico, American professional drummer
- Francis J. Quirico (1911–1999), justice of the Massachusetts Supreme Judicial Court
- Rafael Quirico (born 1969), former Major League Baseball pitcher

Places

- San Quirico d'Orcia, Italian municipality
- Serra San Quirico, Italian municipality
- Corvino San Quirico, Italian municipality
- Quirino Avenue, a 6-10 lane divided highway in Manila, Philippines
- Quiricó Formation, geological formation in Brazil

Others

- Santi Quirico e Giulitta, Roman Catholic titular church
- Santi Quirico e Giulitta (Genoa), Roman Catholic church in Genoa

== See also ==
- Ciriaco
- San Quirico (disambiguation)
