= Palencia (disambiguation) =

Palencia is a city in the autonomous community of Castile and León, Spain.

Palencia may also refer to:

- Province of Palencia, a province in the autonomous community of Castile and León, Spain
- Palencia de Negrilla, a municipality of the province of Salamanca in the autonomous community of Castile and León, Spain
- CF Palencia was a Spanish football team based in Palencia, Castile and León
- Palencia CF (I), founded in 1960 and dissolved in 1986, was a Spanish football club based in Palencia, Castile and León
- Palencia CF, founded in 2013 as CDR Atlético Palencia 1929, is a Spanish football club based in Palencia, Castile and León
- Palencia Baloncesto, a professional Basketball team based in Palencia, Castile and León
- University of Palencia was the first university of Spain
- Palencia Cathedral, a cathedral in Palencia, Castile and León
- Roman Catholic Diocese of Palencia, a diocese located in the city of Palencia in the Ecclesiastical province of Burgos, Spain
- Palencia (Spanish Congress Electoral District)
- Palencia, Guatemala, a municipality in the Guatemala department of Guatemala

== People ==
- Alfonso de Palencia (1423–1492), a Castilian pre-Renaissance historiographer, lexicographer and humanist
- Benjamín Palencia (1894–1980), a Spanish surrealist and painter
- Francisco Palencia (1973-), a former Mexican football striker
- Brina Palencia (1984-), an American actress, voice actress, ADR director and singer
- Daniel Palencia (2000-), a Venezuelan professional baseball pitcher
