= Arabayona de Mógica =

- municipality
- Flag Coat of arms

- Location in Salamanca

- Location in Spain
- Coordinates: 40°02′50″N 5°23′10″W
- Country: Spain
- Autonomous community: Castile and León
- Province: Salamanca
- Comarca: Las Villas

Government
  - Mayor: Diego Maestre Bellido (Spanish Socialist Workers' Party)

Area
  - Total: 23 km^{2} (8.9 sq mi)
- Elevation: 857 m (2,812 ft)

Population (2025-01-01)
  - Total: 318
  - Density: 14/km^{2} (36/sq mi)
- Time zone: UTC+1 (CET)
  - Summer (DST): UTC+2 (CEST)
- Postal code: 37418

Arabayona de Mógica is a village and municipality in the province of Salamanca, western Spain, part of the autonomous community of Castile and León. It is located 24 kilometres (15 mi) from the city of Salamanca and has a population of 392 people. The municipality covers an area of 23 km^{2} (8.9 sq mi).

The village lies 857 metres (2,812 ft) above sea level.

The postal code is 37418.
