= El Pedroso de la Armuña =

- Municipality
- Coat of arms

- Location in Salamanca

- Location in Spain
- Coordinates: 41°04′49″N 5°23′59″W
- Country: Spain
- Autonomous community: Castile and León
- Province: Salamanca
- Comarca: La Armuña

Government
  - Mayor: Ángel Gómez Carrasco (PSOE)

Area
  - Total: 20 km^{2} (7.7 sq mi)
- Elevation: 823 m (2,700 ft)

Population (2025-01-01)
  - Total: 202
  - Density: 10/km^{2} (26/sq mi)
- Time zone: UTC+1 (CET)
  - Summer (DST): UTC+2 (CEST)
- Postal code: 37410

El Pedroso de la Armuña is a village and municipality in the province of Salamanca, western Spain, part of the autonomous community of Castile-Leon. It is located 25 kilometres (16 mi) from the provincial capital city of Salamanca and has a population of 290 people.

== Geography ==
The municipality covers an area of 20.26 km^{2} (7.82 sq mi).

It lies 823 metres (2,700 ft) above sea level.

The postal code is 37410.

== Economy ==
- The basis of the economy is agriculture.
