= Espino de la Orbada =

- Village and Municipality
- Flag Coat of arms

- Location in Salamanca

- Espino de la Orbada
- Coordinates: 41°6′26″N 5°25′28″W
- Country: Spain
- Autonomous community: Castile and León
- Province: Salamanca
- Comarca: La Armuña

Government
  - Mayor: José Ramón Martín (People's Party)

Area
  - Total: 23 km^{2} (8.9 sq mi)
- Elevation: 797 m (2,615 ft)

Population (2025-01-01)
  - Total: 238
  - Density: 10/km^{2} (27/sq mi)
- Time zone: UTC+1 (CET)
  - Summer (DST): UTC+2 (CEST)
- Post Code: 37419
- Area code: +34
- ISO 3166 code: ES

Espino de la Orbada is a village and municipality in the province of Salamanca, western Spain, part of the autonomous community of Castile and León. It is located 28 kilometres (17 mi) from the provincial capital city of Salamanca and has a population of 284.

== Geography ==
The municipality covers an area of 23.45 km^{2} (9.05 sq mi).

It lies 797 metres (2,615 ft) above sea level.

The postal code is 37419.
