= Monterrubio de Armuña =

- Municipality
- Location in Salamanca

- Location in Spain
- Coordinates: 41°01′41″N 5°38′33″W
- Country: Spain
- Autonomous community: Castile and León
- Province: Salamanca
- Comarca: La Armuña

Government
  - Mayor: Manuel José Moro (People's Party)

Area
  - Total: 11 km^{2} (4.2 sq mi)
- Elevation: 804 m (2,638 ft)

Population (2025-01-01)
  - Total: 1,321
  - Density: 120/km^{2} (310/sq mi)
- Time zone: UTC+1 (CET)
  - Summer (DST): UTC+2 (CEST)
- Postal code: 37798

Monterrubio de Armuña is a village and municipality in the province of Salamanca, western Spain, part of the autonomous community of Castile-Leon. It is located 7 kilometres (4.3 mi) from the provincial capital city of Salamanca and has a population of 1,353 people.

== Geography ==
The municipality covers an area of 10.97 km^{2} (4.24 sq mi).

It lies 800 metres (2,600 ft) above sea level.

The postal code is 37798.

== Economy ==
- The basis of the economy is agriculture.

== See also ==
- List of municipalities in Salamanca
