= Castellanos de Villiquera =

- Municipality
- Coat of arms

- Location in Salamanca

- Location in Spain
- Coordinates: 41°02′59″N 5°38′22″W
- Country: Spain
- Autonomous community: Castile and León
- Province: Salamanca
- Comarca: La Armuña

Government
  - Mayor: Santiago Alberto Castañeda Valle (People's Party)

Area
  - Total: 33 km^{2} (13 sq mi)
- Elevation: 828 m (2,717 ft)

Population (2025-01-01)
  - Total: 727
  - Density: 22/km^{2} (57/sq mi)
- Time zone: UTC+1 (CET)
  - Summer (DST): UTC+2 (CEST)
- Postal code: 37797

Castellanos de Villiquera is a municipality in the province of Salamanca, western Spain, part of the autonomous community of Castile-Leon. It is located 11 kilometres (6.8 mi) from the city of Salamanca and as of 2016 has a population of 675 people. The municipality covers an area of 32.81 km^{2} (12.67 sq mi).

The post code is 37797.

== Geography ==
It lies 826 metres (2,710 ft) above sea level. The municipality contains the hamlets La Mata de Armuña (83 people) Carbajosa de Armuña (52 people) and Mozodiel de Sanchíñigo (18 people).
