= San Morales =

- Municipality
- Flag Coat of arms

- Location in Salamanca
- Coordinates: 40°59′35″N 5°30′10″W
- Country: Spain
- Autonomous community: Castile and León
- Province: Salamanca
- Comarca: Las Villas

Government
  - Mayor: Juan Antonio Cortés Pinto (People's Party)

Area
  - Total: 5 km^{2} (1.9 sq mi)
- Elevation: 794 m (2,605 ft)

Population (2025-01-01)
  - Total: 346
  - Density: 69/km^{2} (180/sq mi)
- Time zone: UTC+1 (CET)
  - Summer (DST): UTC+2 (CEST)
- Postal code: 37340

San Morales is a municipality located in the province of Salamanca, Castile and León, Spain. As of 2016 the municipality has a population of 306 inhabitants.
