= Pajares de la Laguna =

- Municipality
- Location in Salamanca

- Location in Spain
- Coordinates: 41°06′17″N 5°30′34″W
- Country: Spain
- Autonomous community: Castile and León
- Province: Salamanca
- Comarca: La Armuña

Government
  - Mayor: J. Antonio Benito (People's Party)

Area
  - Total: 10 km^{2} (3.9 sq mi)
- Elevation: 828 m (2,717 ft)

Population (2025-01-01)
  - Total: 110
  - Density: 11/km^{2} (28/sq mi)
- Time zone: UTC+1 (CET)
  - Summer (DST): UTC+2 (CEST)
- Postal code: 37428

Pajares de la Laguna is a municipality located in the province of Salamanca, Castile and León, Spain. As of 2016 the municipality has a population of 116 inhabitants.
