= La Orbada =

- Municipality
- Location in Salamanca

- Location in Spain
- Coordinates: 41°06′12″N 5°29′07″W
- Country: Spain
- Autonomous community: Castile and León
- Province: Salamanca
- Comarca: La Armuña

Government
  - Mayor: Maria Encarnación Martín Prieto (People's Party)

Area
  - Total: 31 km^{2} (12 sq mi)
- Elevation: 819 m (2,687 ft)

Population (2025-01-01)
  - Total: 177
  - Density: 5.7/km^{2} (15/sq mi)
- Time zone: UTC+1 (CET)
  - Summer (DST): UTC+2 (CEST)
- Postal code: 37428

La Orbada is a municipality located in the province of Salamanca, Castile and León, Spain. As of 2016 the municipality has a population of 224 inhabitants.
