= La Armuña =

- Comarca
- Location in Salamanca
- Country: Spain
- Autonomous community: Castile and León
- Province: Salamanca

Area
  - Total: 700.47 km^{2} (270.45 sq mi)

Population (2010)
  - Total: 26,697
  - Density: 38.113/km^{2} (98.712/sq mi)
- Time zone: UTC+1 (CET)
  - Summer (DST): UTC+2 (CEST)

La Armuña is a comarca in the province of Salamanca, Castile and León. It contains 30 municipalities:

- Aldeanueva de Figueroa
- Arcediano
- Cabezabellosa de la Calzada
- Cabrerizos
- Calzada de Valdunciel
- Castellanos de Moriscos
- Castellanos de Villiquera
- El Pedroso de la Armuña
- Espino de la Orbada
- Forfoleda
- Gomecello
- La Orbada
- La Vellés
- Monterrubio de Armuña
- Moriscos
- Negrilla de Palencia
- Pajares de la Laguna
- Palencia de Negrilla
- Parada de Rubiales
- Pedrosillo el Ralo
- Pitiegua
- San Cristóbal de la Cuesta
- Tardáguila
- Topas
- Torresmenudas
- Valdunciel
- Valverdón
- Villamayor
- Villares de la Reina
- Villaverde de Guareña
