= Ciriaco =

Ciriaco is a male given name in Italian (pronounced [tʃiˈriːako]) and Spanish (pronounced [θiˈɾjako]). In Portuguese, it's spelled Ciríaco (pronounced [siˈɾjaku]).

It derives from the Greek given name Κυριακός (also Κυριάκος) which means of the Lord or lordly; from the Greek kύριος, kyrios: lord. Thus it is equivalent in meaning to names like Dominic, Dominicus and Domenico.

It may refer to:

== People ==
=== Given name ===
- Ciriaco Álvarez (born 1873), Chiloé businessman
- Ciriaco Errasti, a Spanish footballer
- Ciriaco De Mita, Italian politician, Prime Minister of Italy (1988–1989)
- Ciriaco de' Pizzicolli, or Cyriacus of Ancona, an Italian antiquarian and traveller of the 15th century
- Ciriaco Cañete, a Filipino martial artist
- Ciriaco Sforza, a Swiss footballer

=== Surname ===
- Pedro Ciriaco (born 1985), Dominican baseball player for the Boston Red Sox, brother of Audy Ciriaco

== Places ==
- Ciríaco, Brazilian municipality

== See also ==
- Quirico
- Quirino (disambiguation)
