= Negrilla de Palencia =

- Municipality
- Coat of arms

- Location in Salamanca

- Location in Spain
- Coordinates: 41°05′31″N 5°35′36″W
- Country: Spain
- Autonomous community: Castile and León
- Province: Salamanca
- Comarca: La Armuña

Government
  - Mayor: David Lobato (Citizens)

Area
  - Total: 12 km^{2} (4.6 sq mi)
- Elevation: 824 m (2,703 ft)

Population (2025-01-01)
  - Total: 78
  - Density: 6.5/km^{2} (17/sq mi)
- Time zone: UTC+1 (CET)
  - Summer (DST): UTC+2 (CEST)
- Postal code: 37799

Negrilla de Palencia is a sparsely populated village and municipality in the province of Salamanca, western Spain, part of the autonomous community of Castile-Leon. It is located 17 kilometres (11 mi) from the provincial capital city of Salamanca and has a population of 97 people.

== Geography ==
The municipality covers an area of 12 km^{2} (4.6 sq mi).

It lies 824 metres (2,703 ft) above sea level.

The postal code is 37799.

== See also ==
- Palencia de Negrilla
- List of municipalities in Salamanca
