= Valdunciel =

- Municipality
- Location in Salamanca

- Location in Spain
- Coordinates: 41°05′07″N 5°40′17″W
- Country: Spain
- Autonomous community: Castile and León
- Province: Salamanca
- Comarca: La Armuña

Government
  - Mayor: Ángel Escribano (People's Party)

Area
  - Total: 33 km^{2} (13 sq mi)
- Elevation: 804 m (2,638 ft)

Population (2025-01-01)
  - Total: 125
  - Density: 3.8/km^{2} (9.8/sq mi)
- Time zone: UTC+1 (CET)
  - Summer (DST): UTC+2 (CEST)
- Postal code: 37798

Valdunciel is a village and municipality in the province of Salamanca, western Spain, part of the autonomous community of Castile-Leon. As of 2016 it has a population of 95 people.

== Geography ==
It is located 14 kilometers from the provincial capital city of Salamanca and the municipality covers an area of 33 km^{2}. It lies 804 meters above sea level.

The postal code is 37798.
