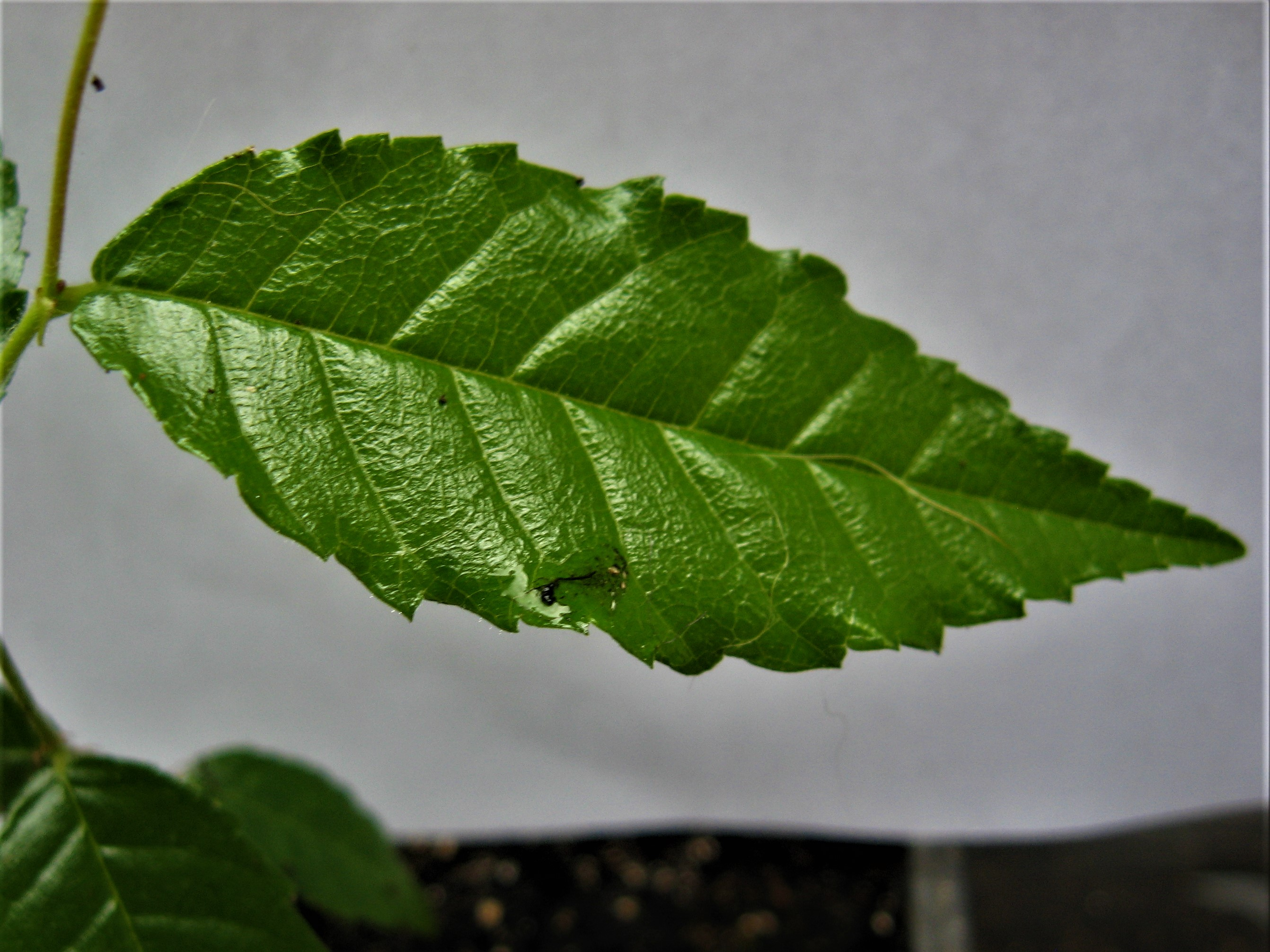
- Leaf of seedling
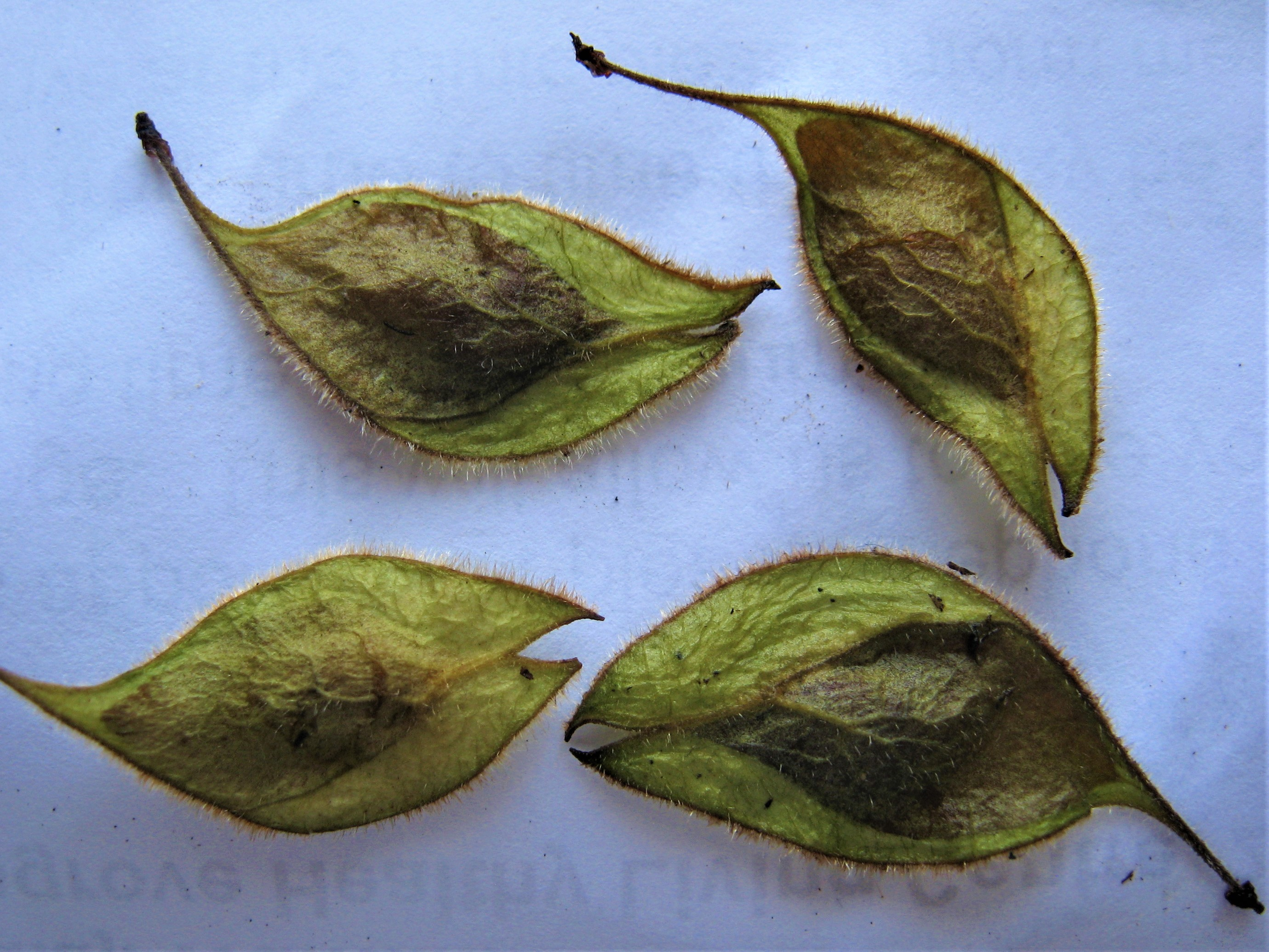
- Samarae

Scientific classification
- Kingdom: Plantae
- Clade: Tracheophytes
- Clade: Angiosperms
- Clade: Eudicots
- Clade: Rosids
- Order: Rosales
- Family: Ulmaceae
- Genus: Ulmus
- Species: U. ismaelis

Binomial name
- Ulmus ismaelis Todzia & Panero

= Ulmus ismaelis =

Species of tree

Ulmus ismaelis is a small tree discovered circa 1997 in southern Mexico by Ismael Calzada in riparian forest along the Mixteco River system in northeastern Oaxaca, where it grows among large boulders in the limestone canyons. The tree has since been found in Honduras and El Salvador. The tree is exceptional in its habitat: dry places, sometimes with less than 50 cm (19.7 in) per annum precipitation, and comparatively low altitudes of 450–750 m (1475–2460 ft).

== Description ==
Rarely growing to over 15 m (49.2 ft) in height, typically less than 10 m (32.8 ft) with a trunk diameter of 30 cm (1 ft); the tree has exfoliating orangish bark. The ovate leaves are coriaceous, less than 9.6 cm (3.8 in) in length by 4.6 cm (1.8 in) broad, acute at the apex, pinnately veined, on short 2–5 mm (0.08–0.2 in) petioles; the colour ranges from dull green to light brown. The apetalous flowers are arranged as short racemes on leafless twigs, sparsely clustered on less than 7 mm (0.28 in) peduncles. The samarae are less than 22 × 13 mm (0.9 x 0.5 in), tapering at the base to a less than 8 mm (0.3 in) stalk, with ciliate margins, and are shed during June and July in Mexico; in Honduras and El Salvador the tree flowers at the time of foliage change, just before the fall of the leaves of the previous season during the months of February and March, and fructifies from March to the end of April, coinciding with the emergence of the new season's leaves.

== Pests and diseases ==
No information available.

== Cultivation ==
The tree is extremely rare in cultivation; it was introduced to Europe in 2019 as seed sent to the Grange Farm Arboretum, Lincolnshire, UK. Seedlings were later disseminated by the arboretum to Butterfly Conservation's main trials site, Great Fontley, Hampshire, UK, and the Escuela Tecnica Superior de Ingenieros de Montes, Universidad Politecnica de Madrid, Spain.

== Etymology ==
The species is named for the Mexican botanist and collector Dr Juan Ismael Calzada, who discovered the tree.

== Accessions ==
=== Europe ===
- Grange Farm Arboretum, Lincs., UK. Seedlings germinated 2019.
- Butterfly Conservation elm trials plantation, Great Fontley, Hants., UK. One seedling, germinated 2019.
