= Topas, Salamanca =

Topas
- Municipality
- Coat of arms

- Location in Salamanca

- Location in Spain
- Coordinates: 41°09′25″N 5°38′02″W
- Country: Spain
- Autonomous community: Castile and León
- Province: Salamanca
- Comarca: La Armuña

Government
  - Mayor: Julia Rivas (PSOE)

Area
  - Total: 112 km^{2} (43 sq mi)
- Elevation: 824 m (2,703 ft)

Population (2025-01-01)
  - Total: 518
  - Density: 4.62/km^{2} (12.0/sq mi)
- Time zone: UTC+1 (CET)
  - Summer (DST): UTC+2 (CEST)
- Postal code: 37799

Topas is a municipality located in the province of Salamanca, Castile and León, Spain. As of 2016 the municipality has a population of 554 inhabitants.
