= Aldealengua =

- Municipality
- Coat of arms

- Location in Salamanca

- Location in Spain
- Coordinates: 40°58′56″N 5°33′00″W
- Country: Spain
- Autonomous community: Castile and León
- Province: Salamanca
- Comarca: Las Villas

Government
  - Mayor: Francisco Albarrán Losada (People's Party)

Area
  - Total: 5 km^{2} (1.9 sq mi)
- Elevation: 800 m (2,600 ft)

Population (2025-01-01)
  - Total: 730
  - Density: 150/km^{2} (380/sq mi)
- Time zone: UTC+1 (CET)
  - Summer (DST): UTC+2 (CEST)

Aldealengua is a village and municipality in the north-west of the province of Salamanca, western Spain, part of the autonomous community of Castile and León.
