= Villoria =

- Municipality
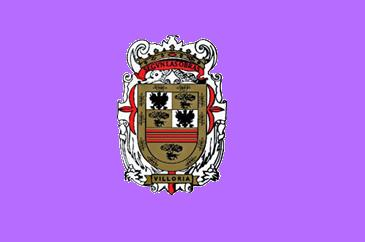
- Flag Coat of arms

- Location in Salamanca
- Coordinates: 40°59′40″N 5°22′29″W
- Country: Spain
- Autonomous community: Castile and León
- Province: Salamanca
- Comarca: Las Villas

Government
  - Mayor: Julián Barrera Prieto (People's Party)

Area
  - Total: 31.65 km^{2} (12.22 sq mi)
- Elevation: 818 m (2,684 ft)

Population (2025-01-01)
  - Total: 1,239
  - Density: 39.15/km^{2} (101.4/sq mi)
- Time zone: UTC+1 (CET)
  - Summer (DST): UTC+2 (CEST)
- Postal code: 37339
- Website: www.villoria.es

Villoria is a municipality located in the province of Salamanca, Castile and León, Spain.
