= Villaverde de Guareña =

- Municipality
- Location in Salamanca

- Location in Spain
- Coordinates: 41°03′50″N 5°31′35″W
- Country: Spain
- Autonomous community: Castile and León
- Province: Salamanca
- Comarca: La Armuña

Government
  - Mayor: Ángel Mellado (People's Party)

Area
  - Total: 15.87 km^{2} (6.13 sq mi)
- Elevation: 831 m (2,726 ft)

Population (2025-01-01)
  - Total: 128
  - Density: 8.07/km^{2} (20.9/sq mi)
- Time zone: UTC+1 (CET)
  - Summer (DST): UTC+2 (CEST)
- Postal code: 37428

Villaverde de Guareña is a Spanish municipality of the province of Salamanca, in the autonomous community of Castile and León. It is in the district of La Armuña. It belongs to the Judicial district of Salamanca and the commonwealth of La Armuña.

The municipality is formed by the locality of Villaverde de Guareña and Cañadilla, it occupies a total surface of 15.87 km^{2} and following the demographic data gathered by the municipal register elaborated by the INE in the year 2017, it has a total of 149 inhabitants.

== History ==
Founded by the Kings of Leon in the Middle Ages, Villaverde de Guareña was framed in the Armuña quarter of the jurisdiction of Salamanca, inside the Kingdom of León calling itself Speola. With the creation of the current provinces in 1833, Villaverde de Guareña was framed inside of the province of Salamanca, inside of the region of León. On 2 of July 1916, the village changed its official denomination from Villaverde to Villaverde de Guareña.
