= Villoruela =

- Municipality
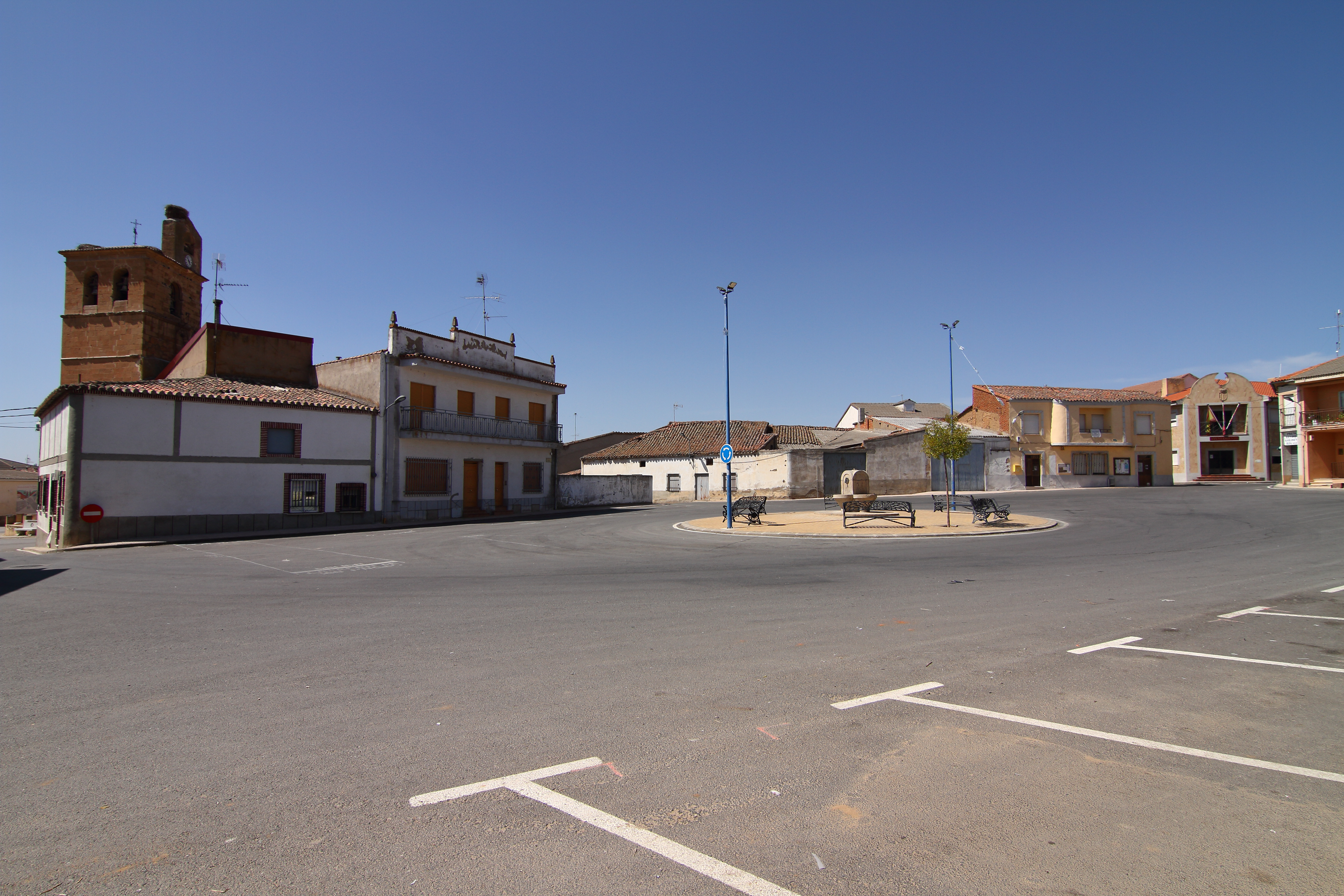

- Flag Coat of arms

- Location in Salamanca
- Coordinates: 41°0′29″N 5°23′40″W
- Country: Spain
- Autonomous community: Castile and León
- Province: Salamanca
- Comarca: Las Villas

Government
  - Mayor: Florentino Hernández García (PSOE)

Area
  - Total: 17.27 km^{2} (6.67 sq mi)
- Elevation: 824 m (2,703 ft)

Population (2025-01-01)
  - Total: 729
  - Density: 42.2/km^{2} (109/sq mi)
- Time zone: UTC+1 (CET)
  - Summer (DST): UTC+2 (CEST)
- Postal code: 37338

Villoruela is a municipality located in the province of Salamanca, Castile and León, Spain. It is part of the region of Las Villas. It belongs to the judicial district of Peñaranda and to the Commonwealth Zone of Cantalapiedra and Las Villas.

Its municipal term is formed by a single population, which occupies a total area of 17.27 km² and according to the demographic data collected in the municipal register prepared by the INE in 2017, it has a population of 790 people.
