= Pedrosillo el Ralo =

- Municipality
- Flag Coat of arms

- Location in Spain.
- Coordinates: 41°03′46″N 5°32′59″W
- Country: Spain
- Autonomous community: Castile and León
- Province: Salamanca
- Comarca: La Armuña

Government
  - Mayor: José Luis Ayuso Gómez (PSOE)

Area
  - Total: 8 km^{2} (3.1 sq mi)

Population (2025-01-01)
  - Total: 147
  - Density: 18/km^{2} (48/sq mi)
- Demonym: Pedrosillanos
- Time zone: UTC+1 (CET)
  - Summer (DST): UTC+2 (CEST)
- Postal code: 37427

Pedrosillo el Ralo is a municipality located in the province of Salamanca, Castile and León, Spain.
