= Gomecello =

- Municipality
- Location in Salamanca

- Location in Spain
- Coordinates: 41°02′35″N 5°32′04″W
- Country: Spain
- Autonomous community: Castile and León
- Province: Salamanca
- Comarca: La Armuña

Government
  - Mayor: Rosa Maria Esteban (People's Party)

Area
  - Total: 21 km^{2} (8.1 sq mi)
- Elevation: 840 m (2,760 ft)

Population (2025-01-01)
  - Total: 411
  - Density: 20/km^{2} (51/sq mi)
- Time zone: UTC+1 (CET)
  - Summer (DST): UTC+2 (CEST)
- Postal code: 37420
- Website: www.gomecello.com

Gomecello is a village and municipality in the province of Salamanca, western Spain, part of the autonomous community of Castile-Leon. It is located 16 kilometres (9.9 mi) from the provincial capital city of Salamanca and has a population of 458 people.

== Geography ==
The municipality covers an area of 21 km^{2} (8.1 sq mi).

It lies 2,334 metres (7,657 ft) above sea level.

The postal code is 37420.

== See also ==
- List of municipalities in Salamanca
