= Las Villas, Salamanca =

Las Villas
- Comarca
- Location in Salamanca
- Country: Spain
- Autonomous community: Castile and León
- Province: Salamanca

Area
  - Total: 176.42 km^{2} (68.12 sq mi)

Population (2014)
  - Total: 5,616
  - Density: 31.83/km^{2} (82.45/sq mi)
- Time zone: UTC+1 (CET)
  - Summer (DST): UTC+2 (CEST)

Las Villas is a comarca in the province of Salamanca, Castile and León, Spain. It contains eleven (Note: Some sources incorrectly report 10 municipalities due to counting Encinas de Abajo as a city instead.)municipalities:

- Aldealengua
- Aldearrubia
- Arabayona de Mógica
- Babilafuente
- Cordovilla
- Encinas de Abajo
- Huerta
- Moríñigo
- San Morales
- Villoria
- Villoruela
