= Valverdón =

- Municipality
- Coat of arms

- Location in Salamanca

- Location in Spain
- Coordinates: 41°02′51″N 5°46′13″W
- Country: Spain
- Autonomous community: Castile and León
- Province: Salamanca
- Comarca: La Armuña

Government
  - Mayor: Carlos Gallego López (PSOE)

Area
  - Total: 22 km^{2} (8.5 sq mi)
- Elevation: 766 m (2,513 ft)

Population (2025-01-01)
  - Total: 266
  - Density: 12/km^{2} (31/sq mi)
- Time zone: UTC+1 (CET)
  - Summer (DST): UTC+2 (CEST)
- Postal code: 37185

Valverdón is a municipality located in the province of Salamanca, Castile and León, Spain. As of 2016 the municipality has a population of 290 inhabitants.
