= Castellanos de Moriscos =

- Municipality
- Coat of arms

- Location in Salamanca

- Location in Spain
- Coordinates: 41°01′11″N 5°35′33″W
- Country: Spain
- Autonomous community: Castile and León
- Province: Salamanca
- Comarca: La Armuña

Government
  - Mayor: Ángel Molina Martínez (People's Party)

Area
  - Total: 14 km^{2} (5.4 sq mi)
- Elevation: 835 m (2,740 ft)

Population (2025-01-01)
  - Total: 3,149
  - Density: 220/km^{2} (580/sq mi)
- Time zone: UTC+1 (CET)
  - Summer (DST): UTC+2 (CEST)
- Postal code: 37439
- Website: castellanosdemoriscos.es

Castellanos de Moriscos is a village and municipality in the province of Salamanca, western Spain, part of the autonomous community of Castile-Leon. It is located 8 kilometres (5.0 mi) from the city of Salamanca and as of 2003 has a population of 406 people. The municipality covers an area of 14 km^{2} (5.4 sq mi).

The village lies 835 metres (2,740 ft) above sea level.

The postal code is 37439.
