= Palencia de Negrilla =

- Municipality
- Coat of arms

- Location in Salamanca

- Location in Spain
- Coordinates: 41°05′38″N 5°36′08″W
- Country: Spain
- Autonomous community: Castile and León
- Province: Salamanca
- Comarca: La Armuña

Government
  - Mayor: J. Carlos García (People's Party)

Area
  - Total: 16 km^{2} (6.2 sq mi)
- Elevation: 825 m (2,707 ft)

Population (2025-01-01)
  - Total: 140
  - Density: 8.7/km^{2} (23/sq mi)
- Time zone: UTC+1 (CET)
  - Summer (DST): UTC+2 (CEST)
- Postal code: 37799
- Website: www.palenciadenegrilla.com

Palencia de Negrilla is a village and municipality in the province of Salamanca, western Spain, part of the autonomous community of Castile-Leon. It is located 18 kilometres (11 mi) from the provincial capital city of Salamanca and has a population of 156 people.

The municipality covers an area of 16 km^{2} (6.2 sq mi) and is 825 metres (2,707 ft) above sea level.

The postal code is 37799. The basis of the economy is agriculture.

== See also ==
- Negrilla de Palencia
- List of municipalities in Salamanca
