= Paz de la Calzada =

Spanish artist

- Born: Spain
- Education: University of Salamanca, Academy of San Carlos
- Known for: Drawing; murals; installation

Paz de la Calzada is a Spanish-born American interdisciplinary artist and illustrator, working in drawing, installation, and public art. The relationship of nature to human life is a major theme in her work. De la Calzada was born and raised in Spain, which largely informs her art practice. She lives in San Francisco, California.

== Early life and education ==
Paz de la Calzada was born in Spain.

De la Calzada received a BFA degree from the University of Salamanca; and received an MFA degree in Painting from the Academy of San Carlos, part of the Faculty of Arts and Design (UNAM). She moved to the United States in 2003.

== Career ==
De la Calzada also has Illustrations published in Rebecca Solnit's books, "Infinite City", and the "Mother of All Questions". Her work is in the permanent collection of the Monterey Museum of Art, Monterey, CA and Abanca Collection, Spain

De la Calzada has created several public art installations and exhibitions in the United States and Spain, including:

- Flowing Together, a permanent public art installation commissioned by The State of California Department of General Services (DGS) for the May Lee Office Complex Grand Façade located in the River District of Sacramento.
- The Nomadic Labyrinth, commissioned by the San Francisco Arts Commission, San Francisco, California. This interactive public installation has been installed at the University of San Francisco's Manresa Gallery, San Francisco; Santa Cruz Museum of Art and History, Santa Cruz; and the Montalvo Arts Center, Saratoga, among other locations.
- Central Market Dreamscape, commissioned by the San Francisco Arts Commission, San Francisco, California;
- "Creative Attention: Art and Community Restoration", at the Palo Alto Arts Center, Palo Alto, California;
- Portale, Thacher Gallery, University of San Francisco, San Francisco, California
- Mural installation at 836M Gallery, San Francisco, California
- The Bucolic Labyrinth, commissioned by the Palo Alto Public Art Program, Palo Alto, California
- Carpet Diem at Sala Alterarte, University of Vigo, Ourense, Spain

== Awards ==
De la Calzada was awarded the Cultural Equity Grant from the San Francisco Arts Commission and residencies from Oberpfälzer Künstlerhaus, Schwandorf, Germany; the Monterey Museum of Art, Monterey, CA; Djerassi Resident Artists Program, Woodside, CA, among others.
