= Aldearrubia =

- municipality
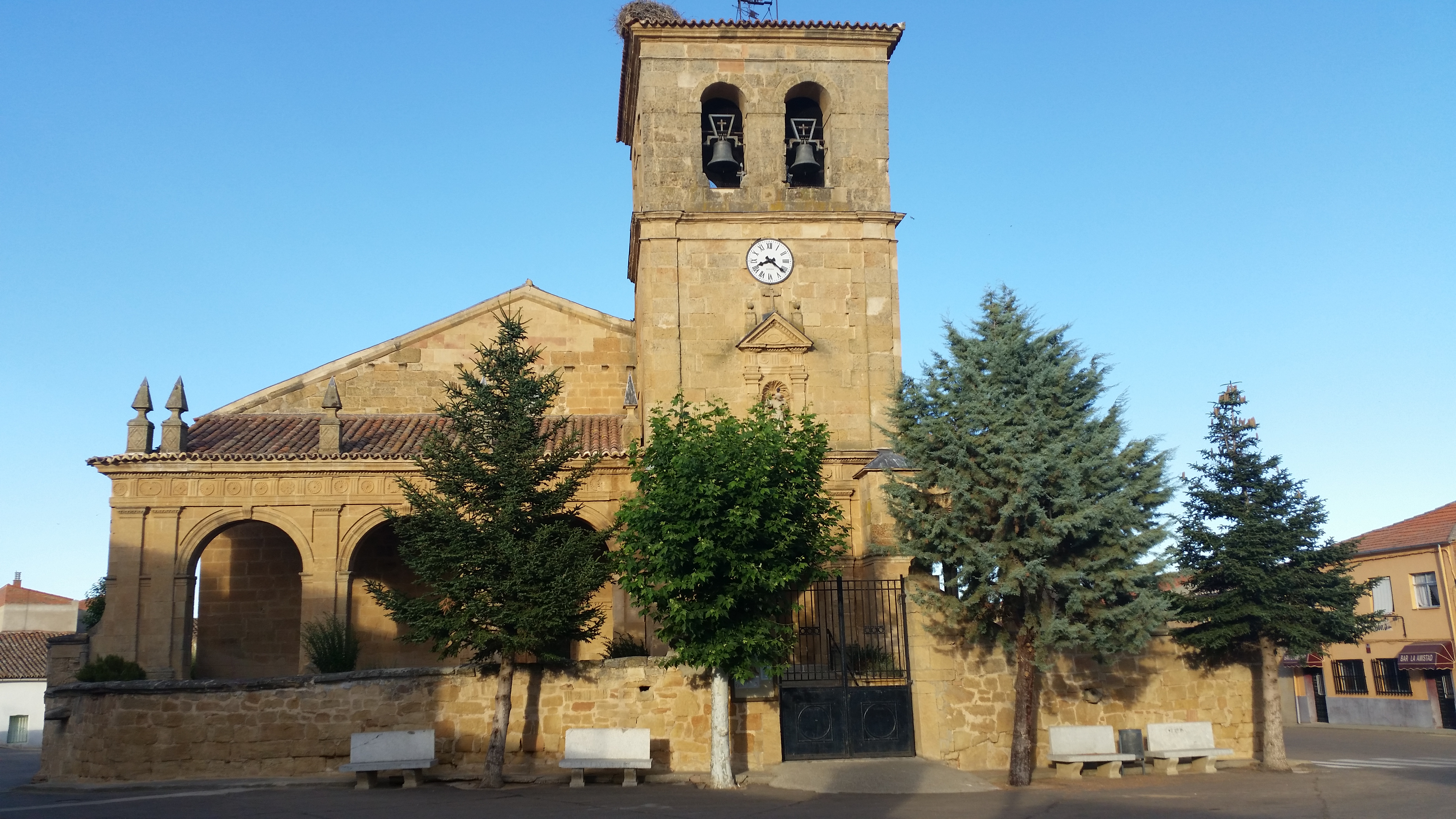
- Church of San Miguel

- Coat of arms

- Location in Salamanca

- Location in Spain
- Coordinates: 41°00′29″N 5°29′51″W
- Country: Spain
- Autonomous community: Castile and León
- Province: Salamanca
- Comarca: Las Villas

Government
  - Mayor: Fidel Montejo Castilla (People's Party)

Area
  - Total: 33 km^{2} (13 sq mi)
- Elevation: 812 m (2,664 ft)

Population (2025-01-01)
  - Total: 518
  - Density: 16/km^{2} (41/sq mi)
- Time zone: UTC+1 (CET)
  - Summer (DST): UTC+2 (CEST)
- Postal code: 37340
- Website: www.aldearrubia.es/

Aldearrubia is a village and municipality in the province of Salamanca, western Spain, part of the autonomous community of Castile and León. It is located 14 kilometres (8.7 mi) from the city of Salamanca and has a population of 487 people. The municipality has an area of 33 km^{2} (13 sq mi).

The village lies 812 metres (2,664 ft) above sea level.
