= Rocío Colette Acuña Calzada =

Colette
- Born: Rocío Collette Acuña Calzada; June 3, 1982 (age 43)
- Origin: Ciudad Victoria, Tamaulipas, Mexico
- Genres: Latin Pop, Pop
- Occupation: Singer
- Years active: 2006–present
- Labels: SonyBMG
- Website: colette.com.mx

Rocío Colette Acuña Calzada (born June 3, 1982 in Ciudad Victoria, Tamaulipas, Mexico), known as Colette, is a singer who finished as runner-up in the 5th series of the Mexican singing show La Academia in 2007 behind the winner Samuel Castelan Marini.

Colette was selected to perform in La Academia after at the fifth attempt, having not been selected for the previous 4 series. She was the first singer in the fifth series to receive standing ovation, when she sang a Spanish interpretation of Frank Sinatra's "My Way". She performed a duet with her mother Leonor Calzada in the same show.

At La Academia she also sang "Coming Out of the Dark" by Gloria Estefan, "El Amor Coloca" from Monica Naranjo "Malo" from Bebe and "La Cima del Cielo" from Venezuelan singer and composer Ricardo Montaner.

Colette's aunt Consuelo Vidal sang for Mexican composer Agustín Lara. In 2007 the mayor of her home town conferred the honor Hija Predilecta de Ciudad Victoria (Favorite Daughter of Ciudad Victoria) on her.

== Music career ==
=== Lo Mejor de La Academia 5 ===
A series of album compilations with the best performances at La Academia 5th Generation. Two volumes have been released: No.1 in Fall 2006 and No.2 in Spring 2007. Colette contributes two songs on each album. In Volume No.1 she participates with tracks A Mi Manera performed in the 6th concert and Ahora que soy Libre performed in the 8th concert. In Volume No.2 she participates with Se Me Olvido Otra Vez from the 10th concert and Desde La Obscuridad performed in the 11th concert.

=== Navidad con Las Estrellas de La Academia ===
This album was released in Christmas season 2006. It contains the performances of various ex-students of La Academia. Colette and Samuel Castelan Marini were the only two students of La Academia 5th Generation to participate in this album. Colette contributes to this album her version of the popular Christmas carol Campana sobre Campana.

=== A Mi Manera ===
Colette released her first studio album A Mi Manera on January 25, 2007 for Sony BMG. The album was recorded inside La Academia. The album peaked at number 5 in the Mexico album charts. An international version was released on April 10, 2007 as a "cut" version of the original album release.

== Songs performed at La Academia ==
- 1st Concert: Yo lo comprendo (duet with Alan Macín Hernández)
- 2nd Concert: Señora
- 3rd Concert: Canalla
- 4th Concert: Aire (Cuando Baja la Marea) from Yuri
- 5th Concert: El Amor Coloca from Monica Naranjo
- 6th Concert: A mi manera (My Way) from Paul Anka
- 7th Concert: Arrasando form Mexican singer Thalía
- 8th Concert: Ahora que soy libre
- 9th Concert: A quien le importa
- 10th Concert: Se me Olvido Otra Vez
- 11th Concert: Desde la Obscuridad (Coming Out of the Dark) from Gloria Estefan
- 12th Concert: Mudanzas from Mexican singer Lupita D'lessio
- 13th Concert: Ven Conmigo (Come on over) from Christina Aguilera
- 14th Concert: Fue un placer conocerte from Spanish singer Rocío Dúrcal
- 15th Concert: Vive from singer Napoleon and No me ames (duet with Samuel Castelan Marini)
- 16th Concert: Como tu and Malo from Bebe
- 17th Concert: No llores por mi Argentina (Don't Cry for Me Argentina) and Cucurrucucu Paloma (duet with Beatriz Marbella Corella Sias)
- 18th Concert: Yo no te pido la Luna and Acompañame (duet with Samuel Castelan Marini)
- 19th Concert: Oye Mi Canto from Gloria Estefan
- 20th Concert: Vive from Mexican pop group Kabah
- 21st Concert: Como una Ola
- 22nd Concert: Ya me canse (Que se Vaya) from Olga Tañon and La cima del cielo from Venezuelan singer and composer Ricardo Montaner
- 23rd Concert: Hasta que me Olvides from Luis Miguel
- 24th Concert: FINAL Malo, El Herradero and Tiempos Mejores

== Discography ==
=== Studio albums ===
Year	Title	Chart positions
Year	Title	MX
2007	A Mi Manera	5

Year	Title	Chart positions
Year	Title	MX
2007–2008	Colette	–
