= Moriscos, Salamanca =

Moriscos
- Municipality
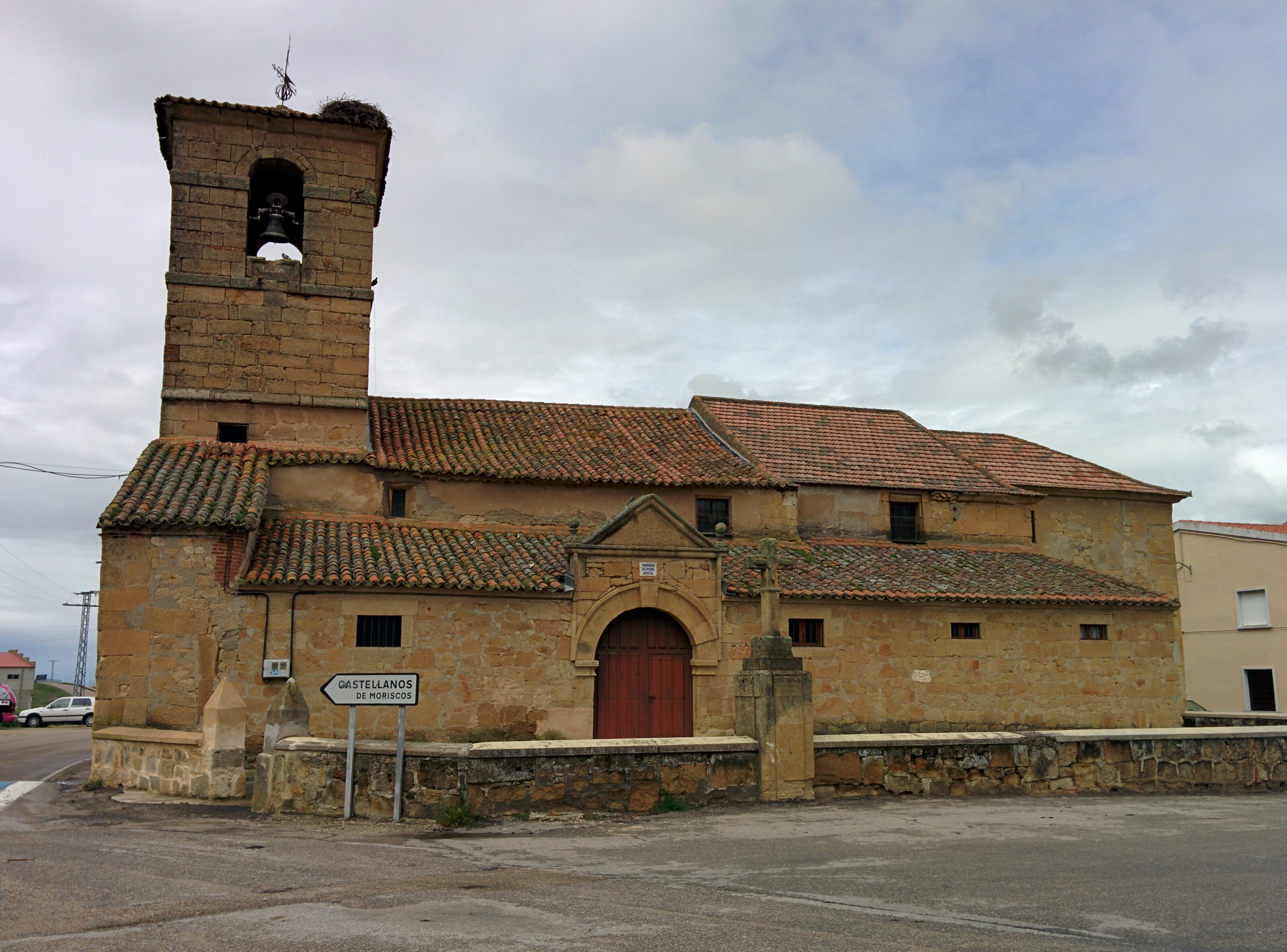
- Church of San Pedro Apostle in Moriscos

- Location in Salamanca

- Location in Spain
- Coordinates: 41°00′30″N 5°35′00″W
- Country: Spain
- Autonomous community: Castile and León
- Province: Salamanca
- Comarca: La Armuña

Area
  - Total: 12.08 km^{2} (4.66 sq mi)
- Elevation: 848 m (2,782 ft)

Population (2025-01-01)
  - Total: 577
  - Density: 47.8/km^{2} (124/sq mi)
- Time zone: UTC+1 (CET)
  - Summer (DST): UTC+2 (CEST)

Moriscos is a municipality located in the province of Salamanca, Castile and León, Spain. According to the 2014 census (INE), the municipality had a population of 325.
