= Calzada Larga =

- Location within Panama
- Coordinates: 9°10′12″N 79°34′12″W
- Country: Panama
- Province: Panamá

Population (2008)
  - Total: 1,591
- Source: Google Maps World Gazeteer

Calzada Larga is a town in the Panamá Province of Panama, 20 kilometres (12 mi) north of Panama City.
