= Moríñigo =

- Municipality
- Coat of arms

- Location in Salamanca
- Coordinates: 40°58′10″N 5°24′50″W
- Country: Spain
- Autonomous community: Castile and León
- Province: Salamanca
- Comarca: Las Villas

Government
  - Mayor: Francisco Javier Maestre de Carlos (People's Party)

Area
  - Total: 8 km^{2} (3.1 sq mi)
- Elevation: 803 m (2,635 ft)

Population (2025-01-01)
  - Total: 93
  - Density: 12/km^{2} (30/sq mi)
- Time zone: UTC+1 (CET)
  - Summer (DST): UTC+2 (CEST)
- Postal code: 37337

Moríñigo is a municipality located in the province of Salamanca, Castile and León, Spain. As of 2016, the municipality has a population of 102 inhabitants.
