= Calzada de Valdunciel =

- Municipality
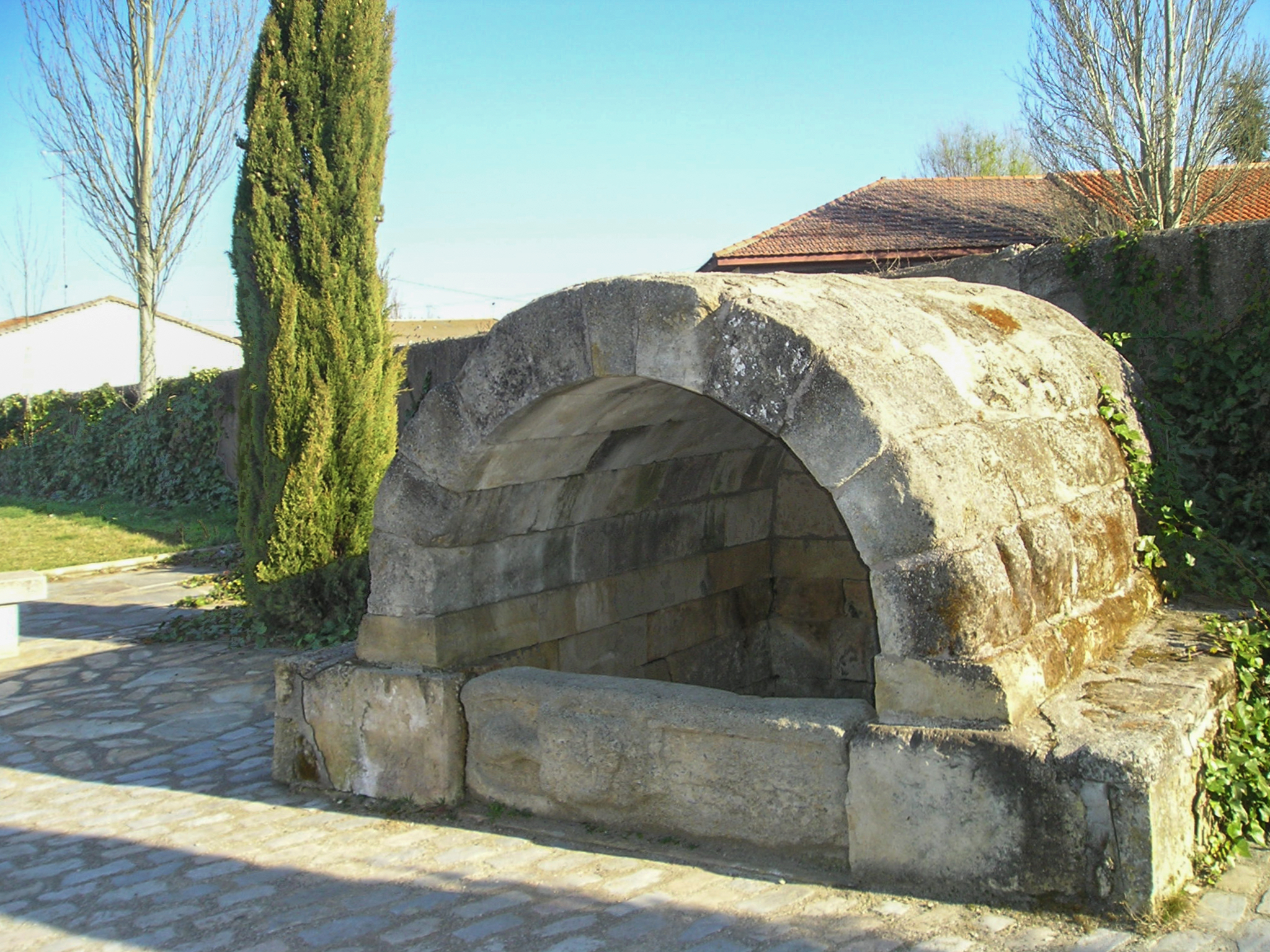
- Roman fountain.

- Coat of arms

- Location in Spain
- Coordinates: 41°05′11″N 5°42′09″W
- Country: Spain
- Autonomous community: Castile and León
- Province: Salamanca
- Comarca: La Armuña

Government
  - Mayor: Román Javier Hernández Calvo

Area
  - Total: 20 km^{2} (7.7 sq mi)
- Elevation: 801 m (2,628 ft)

Population (2025-01-01)
  - Total: 717
  - Density: 36/km^{2} (93/sq mi)
- Demonym(s): Calzudos, Calzadenses or Calzadinos
- Time zone: UTC+1 (CET)
  - Summer (DST): UTC+2 (CEST)
- Postal code: 37797
- Website: www.calzadadevaldunciel.es

Calzada de Valdunciel is a village and municipality in the province of Salamanca, western Spain, part of the autonomous community of Castile and León. It is 14 kilometres (8.7 mi) from the provincial capital city of Salamanca.
