= Juan Ismael Calzada =

Mexican botanist and collector

Juan Ismael Calzada is a Mexican botanist and collector. Dr Calzada is credited with the discovery of the elm Ulmus ismaelis, named in his honour.

== Partial works ==
- El estropajo. Xalapa Instituto Nacional de Investigaciones sobre Recursos Bioticos. 1982. INIREB informa 52
