= Huerta, Salamanca =

Huerta
- Municipality
- Coat of arms

- Location in Salamanca
- Coordinates: 40°58′5″N 5°28′8″W
- Country: Spain
- Autonomous community: Castile and León
- Province: Salamanca
- Comarca: Las Villas

Government
  - Mayor: José Lázaro Noreña (People's Party)

Area
  - Total: 14 km^{2} (5.4 sq mi)
- Elevation: 788 m (2,585 ft)

Population (2025-01-01)
  - Total: 282
  - Density: 20/km^{2} (52/sq mi)
- Time zone: UTC+1 (CET)
  - Summer (DST): UTC+2 (CEST)
- Postal code: 37336

Huerta is a municipality located in the province of Salamanca, Castile and León, Spain.
