= Cabezabellosa de la Calzada =

- Municipality
- Coat of arms

- Location in Salamanca

- Location in Spain
- Coordinates: 41°02′37″N 5°29′25″W
- Country: Spain
- Autonomous community: Castile and León
- Province: Salamanca
- Comarca: La Armuña

Government
  - Mayor: Carmen Herrero (People's Party)

Area
  - Total: 8 km^{2} (3.1 sq mi)
- Elevation: 856 m (2,808 ft)

Population (2025-01-01)
  - Total: 73
  - Density: 9.1/km^{2} (24/sq mi)
- Time zone: UTC+1 (CET)
  - Summer (DST): UTC+2 (CEST)
- Postal code: 37490

Cabezabellosa de la Calzada is a village and municipality in the province of Salamanca, western Spain, part of the autonomous community of Castile and León. It is 23 kilometres (14 mi) from the provincial capital city of Salamanca and has a population of 87 people. It lies 856 metres (2,808 ft) above sea level and the postal code is 37490.

== See also ==
- List of municipalities in Salamanca
