= San Cristóbal de la Cuesta =

- Municipality
- Flag Coat of arms

- Location in Salamanca

- Location in Spain
- Coordinates: 41°01′49″N 5°37′07″W
- Country: Spain
- Autonomous community: Castile and León
- Province: Salamanca
- Comarca: La Armuña

Government
  - Mayor: Abel Celso García Martín (Cs)

Area
  - Total: 10 km^{2} (3.9 sq mi)
- Elevation: 829 m (2,720 ft)

Population (2025-01-01)
  - Total: 1,169
  - Density: 120/km^{2} (300/sq mi)
- Time zone: UTC+1 (CET)
  - Summer (DST): UTC+2 (CEST)
- Postal code: 37439

San Cristóbal de la Cuesta is a municipality located in the province of Salamanca, Castile and León, Spain. As of 2016 the municipality has a population of 958 inhabitants.
