= Cabrerizos =

- Municipality
- Coat of arms

- Location in Salamanca

- Location in Spain
- Coordinates: 40°58′45″N 5°36′46″W
- Country: Spain
- Autonomous community: Castile and León
- Province: Salamanca
- Comarca: La Armuña

Government
  - Mayor: María Lourdes Villoria López (People's Party)

Area
  - Total: 12 km^{2} (4.6 sq mi)
- Elevation: 826 m (2,710 ft)

Population (2025-01-01)
  - Total: 4,218
  - Density: 350/km^{2} (910/sq mi)
- Time zone: UTC+1 (CET)
  - Summer (DST): UTC+2 (CEST)
- Postal code: 37193

Cabrerizos is a village and municipality in the province of Salamanca, western Spain, part of the autonomous community of Castile-Leon. It is located only 4 kilometres (2.5 mi) from the city of Salamanca and has a population of 4205 people. The municipality covers an area of 12 km^{2}, lying 826 metres (2,710 ft) above sea level and the postal code is 37193.
