= Santi Quirico e Giulitta (Genoa) =

Church building in Genoa, Italy

Coordinates: 44°29′09.71″N 8°54′02.17″E

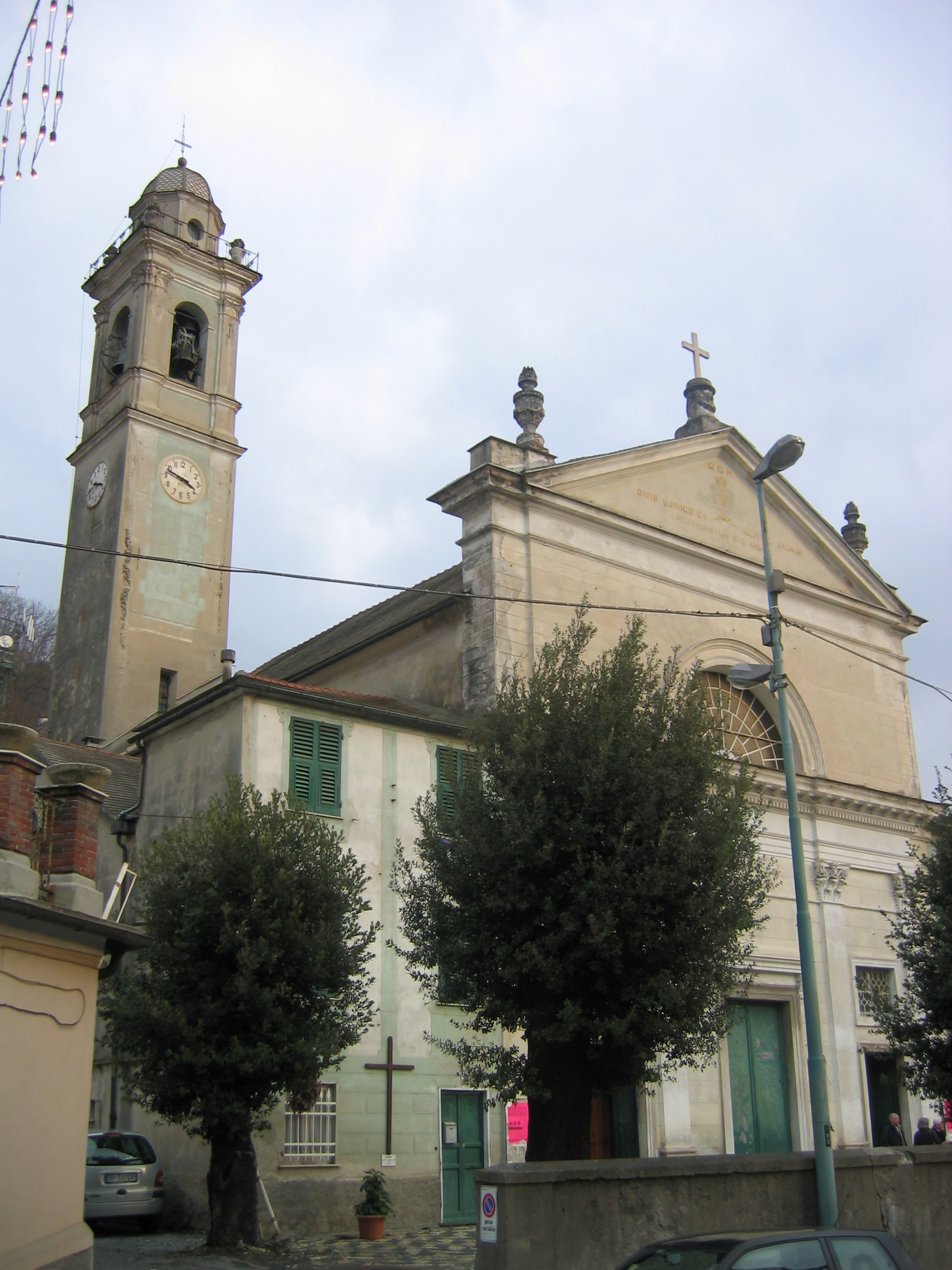
- Façade and belltower

Religion
- Affiliation: Roman Catholic
- Province: Genoa

Location
- Location: Genoa, Italy
- Interactive map of Santi Quirico e Giulitta

Architecture
- Type: Church
- Style: Neoclassic
- Groundbreaking: 1851
- Completed: 1851

The church Santi Quirico e Giulitta is a church in the Genovese quarter of San Quirico, located on val Polcevera.

A church at the site is first recorded by 1143. It underwent a number of reconstructions and enlargements. By the 1840s, the church nearly lay in ruins, with the roof caving in. Construction of the present Neoclassic structure and façade began in 1849; it represents the designs of the architect Angelo Scaniglia, and was consecrated in 1851. The interior frescos mainly reflect Michele Cesare Danielli who died at the young age of 32 in 1853. It is ornamented by the paintings of Giovanni Mola. Further decoration was made by Camillo Torsegno in 1870. The wooden statues of the titular saints at the altar, were produced by Giuseppe Rungaldier.

Among the remnants of the older temple, is a small tempietto made of marble on the main altar. It also contains canvases of St Clair in adoration of the Holy Sacrament by Giovanni Andrea Carlone, St Felice Bishop celebrates Mass by Giovanni Andrea de Ferrari, Extasis of St. Theresa of Avila by Domenico Piola e St Ursula and the Virgins and the Holy Family by Domenico Fiasella.

== Gallery ==
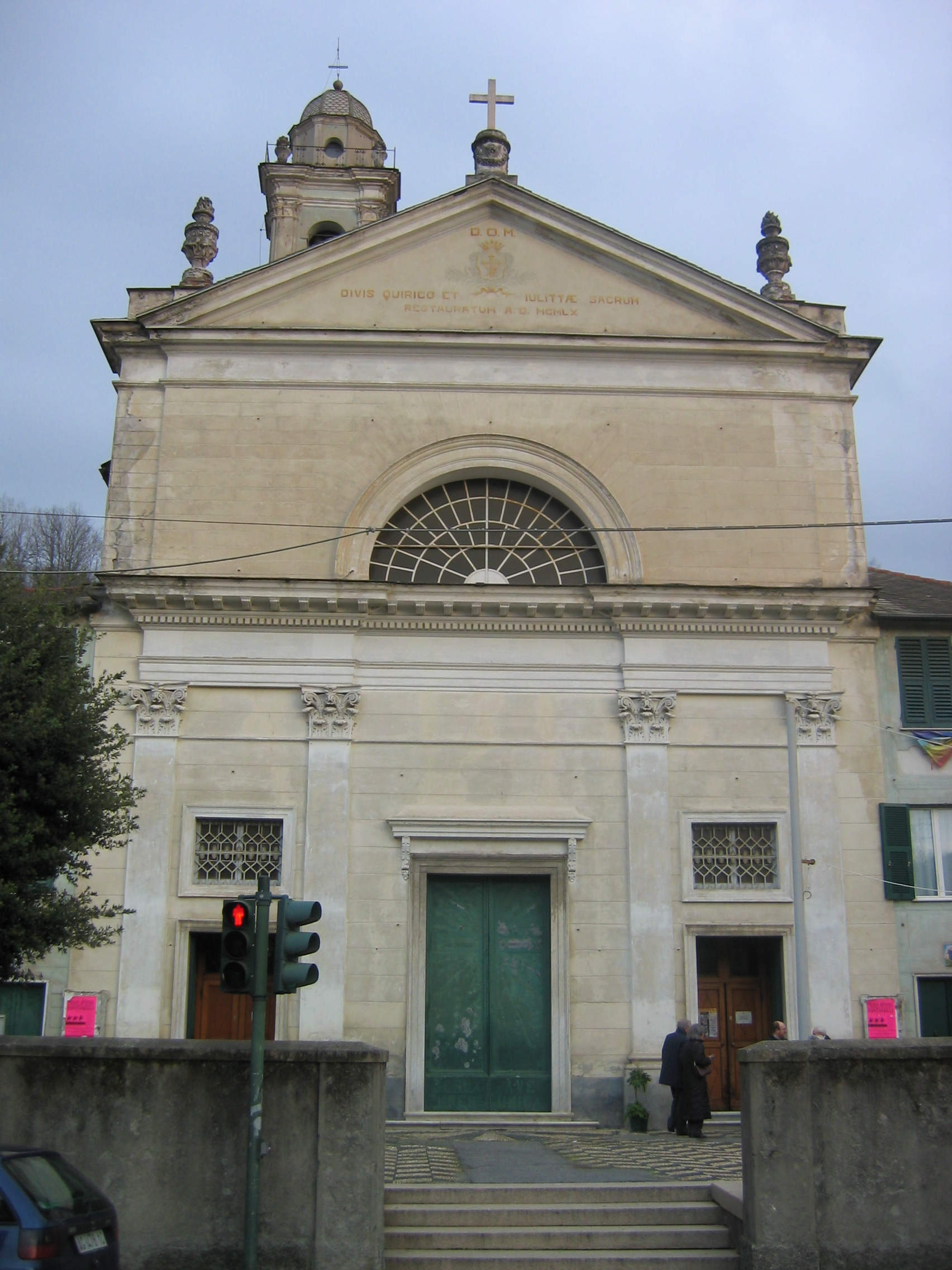
The façade
