= San Quirico Martire =

Church in Bolano, Italy

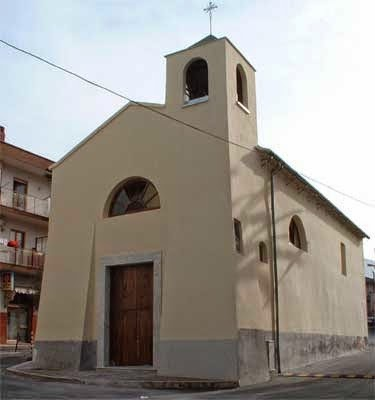
The church

San Quirico Martire is the Roman Catholic church in the frazione of Bolano in the comune of Fisciano, province of Salerno, region of Campania, Italy.

== History ==
Originally this was a chapel dedicated to Santa Maria del Carmine associated with the Congrega della Carità of Fisciano. It replaced in 1890 an earlier ancient church of San Quirico, outside of town, in a lowlying area, which due to repeated flooding had caused the structure to fall into ruin. The Belltower was built in 1897. A number of the ornaments date from this year including the canvas depicting the S.S Vergine di Pompei, the Madonna of the Carmine, and the altar of the Addolorata.

Originally a rural location, it is now in an urban neighborhood.
