= Women in the Popular Front in the Spanish Civil War =

Women in the Popular Front in the Spanish Civil War were part of a broad leftist coalition founded ahead of the 1936 Spanish general elections. The Second Spanish Republic represented a changing cultural and political landscape in which women's political organizations could flourish for the first time. It failed to empower women completely, as they were often locked out of governance roles and positions in political organizations. Many organizations continued to discriminate against women, as Marxist ideology did not see them as a unique group with special needs but as part of larger class grouping in which class equality needed to be prioritized.

The Spanish Civil War started in July 1936, and would pit the Nationalist forces of the right against the Republican forces of the Popular Front government. It took the creation of the Popular Front to persuade the left to encourage women to mobilize in large numbers in support of the Republic. This included encouraging them to leave the home and engage in activities less associated with the domestic sphere. It was in this climate that a number of important women's organizations were created or flourished. In some cases, it led to women gaining leadership of a kind they had not achieved before, such as inside militias. It did not inspire unification among women inside the Popular Front itself as many divisions existed, eventually leading to leftist-organized internal purges with Popular Front parties turning on each other.

The end of the war and the start of the Francoism saw a return for women to the traditional gender roles of Catholic Spain. It saw ostracization and imprisonment of women who fought for the Popular Front on the front. It saw many women sent to overcrowded prisons, where the children born there faced high rates of death. Many other women went into exile. Despite playing a key role for the Republican side as members of the Popular Front, the legacy of these women has largely been ignored. This stems from sexism, propaganda that said they were deviants, and a lack of primary sources.

== Background ==
The Popular Front was a coalition of leftist parties created during the Second Spanish Republic ahead of the 1936 elections as a way of ensuring a left wing majority in the Congreso de Diputados. The ability to do so was a result of a number of complex factors, but was assisted by the decision of the Community Party of Spain to engage with the Spanish Socialist Workers' Party and not dismiss them as irrelevant supporters of the bourgeoisie. Their goal was to win back government, after right-wing factions had won the elections in 1933. A previous attempt at an alliance ahead of the 1933 elections had largely failed because of opposition by the CNT.

Popular Front
Members	Supported by
Spanish Socialist Workers' Party (PSOE) – Socialist; Communist Party of Spain (PCE) – Communist; Workers' Party of Marxist Unification (POUM) – Trotskyist; Republican Left (IR) – Republican; Republican Union (UR) – Republican	Republican Left of Catalonia (ERC) – Catalan nationalist; Galicianist Party – Galician nationalist; Workers' General Union (UGT) – Socialist trade union; CNT-FAI – Anarcho-syndicalist trade union

Map of the results of the February 1936 by province: the Republican winners of the Popular Front are in red, while the Nationalist winners are in purple and the Centrists winners are in green

Party	Seats	Parliamentary Group in Congress
Partido Socialista Obrero Español	99	Partido Socialista Obrero Español
Izquierda Republicana	87	Grupo Izquierda Republicana
Unión Republicana	38	Unión Republicana
Esquerra Republicana de Catalunya	22	Grupo Esquerra Catalana
Partido Comunista de España	17	Partido Comunista de España
Acció Catalana	5	Grupo Esquerra Catalana
Unió Socialista de Catalunya	4	Grupo Esquerra Catalana
Partido Galleguista	3	Grupo Izquierda Republicana
Partit Nacionalista Republicà d'Esquerra	2	Grupo Esquerra Catalana
Unió de Rabassaires	2	Grupo Esquerra Catalana
Partido Republicano Democrático Federal	2	Grupo Mixto
Republicanos independientes de Izquierdas	2	Grupo Mixto
Partit Català Proletari	1	Grupo Esquerra Catalana
Esquerra Valenciana	1	Grupo Esquerra Catalana
Partido Obrero de Unificación Marxista	1	Grupo Mixto
Partido Sindicalista	1	Grupo Mixto
Partido Sindicalista Independiente	1	Grupo Mixto
Total	263	

== Second Spanish Republic (1931–1937) ==
=== 1936 elections ===
The February 1936 elections saw the return of a leftist government. Together, the various left wing groups formed the Popular Front. They replaced a repressive right leaning government that had been in power for the two previous years. The Popular Front won elections in February 1936 on a progressive platform, promising major reforms to government. In response, even as the left began reform plans to undo conservative efforts in the previous government, the military began planning to arm their supporters and to overthrow the new government. The Popular Front, in contrast, refused to arm its own supporters out of fear they would then use their weapons to fight the Government.

Dolores Ibárruri campaigned for a deputy in the Cortes ahead of the 1936 elections as a member of the Popular Front. In Asturias, she campaigned before groups of Socialists, Communists, Anti-fascists and Republicans. She improved her oratory skills that would serve her later during the Civil War by observing speakers who succeeded in engaging their audiences. Ibárruri won, and entered the Cortes as a member of the Popular Front, in the Communist minority. Unlike some of their peers on the left, she and other Communists advocated citizens taking up arms in preparation for what they saw as the coming conflict. The 1936 elections saw Julia Álvarez Resano enter parliament as a member of PSOE. She came to the Cortes having previously served as a defense lawyer for the Spanish Federation of Land Workers. Matilde de la Torre won election again in 1936.

=== Political activity ===
The changing political landscape of the Second Republic meant there was an environment for the first time in which women's political organizations could flourish. Despite this, women were largely locked out of organized political groups and events in this period, even when their groups claimed to be for gender equity. Major trade unions at the time like the UGT and the CNT ignored the specific needs of women, including maternity leave, childcare provisions and equal pay; instead they focused on general needs or the needs of men in the workforces they represented. The CNT perpetuated gender inequality, paying its female employees less than men in comparable positions. Only 4% of UGT's membership was female by 1932.

One of the greatest challenges faced by leftist women was Marxism prioritizing the issue of class equality over gender issues. For anarchists, trade unionists, communist and socialist women, this often resulted in the male leadership dismissing women's needs. Women might not be permitted to participate in their agenda as their needs did not directly relate to the class struggle. Some leftist men, both in political and labor organizations, also resented women entering the workforce, believing their lower wages would cause employers to lower the wages of male workers.

Despite differences in ideology, communist, Republican and socialist meet to discuss the political issues of the day. They also worked to mobilize women en masse to protest issues they felt were important. One such mobilization occurred in 1934, when the Republican government considered calling up its reserve forces for military action in Morocco. Within hours of the news hitting the streets, Communist, Republican and Socialist women had organized a women's march in Madrid to protest the proposed action. Many women were arrested, taken to police headquarters and later released.

=== Start of the Civil War ===
Location of Melilla, where Nationalist forces started their campaign in 1936.

On 17 July 1936, the Unión Militar Española launched a coup d'état in North Africa and Spain. They believed they would have an easy victory. They failed to predict the people's attachment to the Second Republic. With the Republic largely maintaining control over its Navy, Franco and others in the military successfully convinced Adolf Hitler to provide transport for Spanish troops from North Africa to the Iberian peninsula. These actions led to a divided Spain, and the protracted events of the Spanish Civil War. It would not officially end until 1 April 1939.

Franco's initial coalition included monarchists, conservative Republicans, Falange Española members, Carlist traditionalists, Roman Catholic clergy and the Spanish army. They had support from fascist Italy and Nazi Germany. The Republican side included Socialists, Communists, and various other left wing actors.

The military revolt was announced on the radio across the country, and people took to the streets immediately as they tried to determine the extent of the situation, and if it was a military or political conflict. Ibárruri coined the phrase "¡No pasarán!" a few days later, on 18 July 1936 in Madrid while broadcasting from the Ministry of the Interior's radio station, saying, "It is better to die on your feet than live on your knees. ¡No pasarán!"

Great Britain, France, Germany, Italy and the Soviet Union signed the Non-Intervention Treaty in August 1936, promising not to provide material support for the war to any of the parties, even as Germany and Italy were already providing support to Spain's fascists.

== Spanish Civil War (1936–1939) ==
It took the creation of the Popular Front to persuade the left to encourage women to mobilize in large numbers in support of the Republic. They were encouraged to leave the home and engage in activities less associated with the domestic sphere. It was in this climate that a number of important women's organization were created or flourished. These included Asociación de Mujeres Antifascistas (AMA), and Mujeres Libres.

=== Political parties and labor organizations ===
During the Spanish Civil War, various political and government forces on the Republican side tried to encourage women's participation. Only one group acted overtly on feminist goals, namely Mujeres Libres. For the remaining political parties, labor groups and government organizations, women's rights and feminists goals were not among their major concerns. Women continued to be locked out of political activity on the Republican side. Meetings for women's rights among union members might only be attended by men, as the idea of allowing women to attend political events was often alien.

Working-class women involved with both anarchists and socialists often ostracized women from other villages who came from different left-wing political parties. There was a lack of solidarity. Pilar Vivancos explained this as a result of a lack of education among women, with patriarchy within parties being used to set women against each other instead of collectively working towards emancipation of women. They did not understand what it truly meant, and it made them vulnerable to political puritanism that would later sweep through the left.

The varying political parties during this period on the left would all work with each other and, in the latter stages of the war, against each other. The PCE would often be at the center of much of this, trying to attract support for their Stalinist Communism ideology from various left-wing factions. When they were not trying to directly collaborate, crossover in membership would see many communist women involved in other organizations.

In general, the PSOE began espousing a more militant approach to combating right-wing actors inside Spain, continuing this thinking as the history of the Second Republic chugged along in the face of increasing numbers of labor conflicts and male leadership quarrels. Nelken was the political leader of the PSOE's women's wing. Her feminist beliefs worried and threatened her male colleagues in the Cortes. Despite this, Nelken was the only woman during the Second Republic to win three elections for the Socialists to serve in the Cortes. Her election wins came in 1931, 1933 and 1936. Disillusionment with the party led her to change membership to the Communist Party in 1937.

During the immediate pre-Civil War period, Campoamor tried to rejoin the Spanish socialists but was repeatedly rejected. Her support of universal suffrage, feminist goals and divorce had made her an anathema to the male dominated party leadership. Eventually, in 1938, she went into exile in Argentina. In general, the PSOE began espousing a more militant approach to combating right-wing actors inside Spain, continuing this thinking as the history of the Second Republic chugged along in the face of increasing numbers of labor conflicts and male leadership quarrels.

==== Anarchists ====
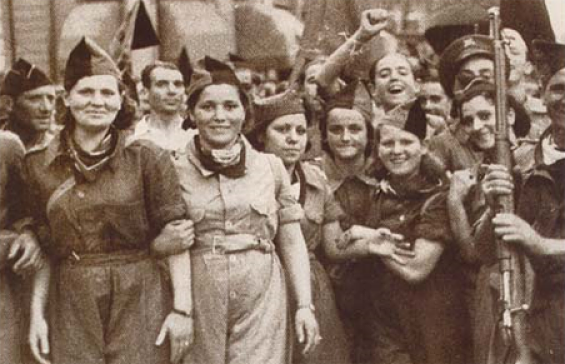
An Anarcha-feminist militia during the Spanish Social Revolution.

During the Civil War, there were often tensions Mujeres Libres and other anarchist groups. The Economic Council of the Socialized Woodwork Industry and Solidaridad Internacional Antifascista both had women in high level leadership positions, and in leadership spots further down. In contrast, Mujeres Libres was a CNT auxiliary, and the women were often denied a specific spot at the table as there was a view among anarchist leaders that the adults, not women, should be the ones making decisions. Anarchists often were unwilling to give solidarity to women combating gender based problems at this time. There were always questions of if women should be fully integrated or should work in women's only groups to achieve specific aims. This resulted in making the movement less effective in accomplishing goals related to women.

Most of the militias that were created during the immediate outbreak of the Civil War came from civil society groups like trade unions and political parties. CNT, UGT and other unions stepped in to provide logistical support for many of these militias. The number of women mobilized was never high. Most joined in order to further support political ideologies they supported. Most came from militant libertarian organizations like CNT, FAI and FIJL. These militias often lacked the typical military structure in order to better represent their ideologies and better mobilize local populations.

===== Mujeres Libres =====
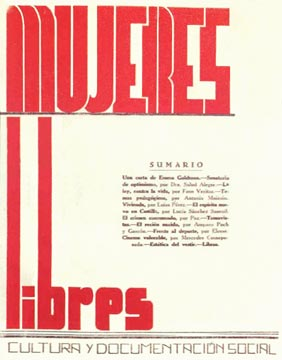
The first edition of Mujeres Libres, a magazine published by the organization of the same name.

Mujeres Libres became one of the most important women's anarchist organizations during the Civil War. Their Civil War ranks were aided by women moving over from CNT to participation in their organization. The organization's importance was a result of the activities they were carrying out. They included running educational programming, and trying to increase the literacy rate among women. They were also organizing collective kitchens, parent controlled daycare centers, and providing prenatal and infant health information to expecting parents. One of their biggest struggles during the Civil War was around fighting prostitution. Education was viewed a key aspect of this, as they believed educated women would be less likely to turn to prostitution. They had over 20,000 members by 1938. Mujeres Libres also published a journal of the same name. Writings found in it focused on personal autonomy, the creation of female identities, and self-esteem. It also often addressed the conflicts in identity between being a woman and being a mother, and how women should navigate their identities as maternal figures.

The October 1938 CNT congress in Barcelona saw Mujeres Libres locked out, with the fifteen women strong delegation barred from entering. Women had previously been allowed to attend, but only as representatives of other, mixed gendered anarchist organizations. A women's only organization was not tolerated. The women protested this, and would not get an answer until an extraordinary meeting of CNT on 11 February 1939. When their answer came, it was that "an independent women's organization would undermine the overall strength of the libertarian movement and inject and element of disunity that would have negative consequences for the development of working-class interests and the liberarian movement on the whole."

Foreign anarchists often found organizations like Mujeres Libres baffling, as discussions around women's rights by Spanish anarchist women were often based around expanding rights while at the same time maintaining traditional gender roles. Older members were often critical of younger ones, whom they viewed as being too hesitant to act and over their perceived obsession on issues like sexuality, birth control and access to abortions.

Mujeres Libres folded by the end of the Civil War.

==== Anti-fascists organizations ====
Anti-fascist organizations often attracted a heterogeneous membership. This at times could lead to major differences, discrepancies and priorities when it came to implementing anti-fascist programs. Different groups including socialists, communists and anarchists would sometimes work to take advantage of this inside these organizations.

===== Partido Obrero de Unificación Marxista (POUM) =====
Partido Obrero de Unificación Marxista (POUM) was the dissident communist party during this period. Their engagement for women involved trying to create specific female sub-organizations for them to join. In June 1937, the Franco regime and the Communists in control of Republican areas both declared POUM illegal, leading to the dissolution of the group. POUM women served on the front, but were also engaged in many other important roles including in POUM governance, writing and publishing POUM affiliated publications, and serving as teachers among the civilian population.

===== Agrupación de Mujeres Antifascistas =====
While the Agrupación de Mujeres Antifascistas (AMA) represented women from a wide variety of political backgrounds, it ended up serving as a vehicle of communist orthodoxy designed to mobile women to support the Communist cause on the Republican side of the civil war.

==== Communist organizations ====
Asociación de Mujeres contra la Guerra y el Fascismo underwent a second name change in 1936, shortly after the start of the Civil War. Their new name was Agrupación de Mujeres Antifascistas. From there, the group would play a prominent role in sending and supporting women on the front lines in the war.

===== Partido Comunista de España =====
While other communist organizations existed, Partido Comunista de España remained the dominant one. In the first year of the Civil War, the PCE rapidly increased their membership by nearly three-fold. Among the peasantry, women represented nearly a third of PCE's membership.

During the Civil War, Ibárruri earned herself the nickname La Pasionaria as she traveled the country to speak in opposition to Francoist forces. She also used radio to spread her message, becoming famous for calling men and women to arms, saying, "¡No pasarán!" One of the most famous phrases she uttered in the civil war was, "It is better to die on your feet than live on your knees." The Communist Party did not approve of her private life though, asking her to end her relationship with a male party member who was seventeen years younger than her, which she did.

Female Stalinists actively participated in POUM and Trotskyite purges in Barcelona. Women like Teresa Pàmies were intentionally excluded POUM affiliated women even as they tried to build bridges with PSOE. Teresa Pàmies wrote for a number of Communist publications during the war while she was only a teenager. These publications included Juliol, Treball, and La Rambla. During the Civil War, Teresa Pàmies founded the Catalan branch of JSU. Near the end of the war, she was a delegate at the Second World Youth Peace Conference at Vassar College in the United States. While there, she was surrounded by all the Spanish leftist factions, except POUM. Pàmies would also be responsible for isolating POUM's youth organization, Juventudes Comunistas Ibéricas, in such a way that it would leave blood on her hands. Teresa Pàmies exclusion of POUM is notable as her cousins were part of the organization, and her opinion of them was that they were committed anti-Fascists.

Following the start of the civil war, Matilde Landa worked at a PCE affiliated war hospital in Madrid.

==== Socialists ====
During the Civil War, broader problems that pre-dated it continued, and meant socialist groups tended to lack female participation. When socialist women wanted to get involved, they either had to do so through socialist youth organizations or they had to switch allegiances to the communist, who were more accepting of women and more likely to put them into leadership positions.

Abroad, socialist women were more active in their opposition to the Spanish Civil War. Belgian women socialists were opposed to their socialist party's neutrality during the Spanish Civil War. To counter this, these women socialist were active in trying to evacuate refugees. Among their accomplishments were evacuating 450 Basque children to Belgium in March 1937. With the assistance of the Belgian Red Cross and Communist's Red Aid, socialist women organized the placement of 4,000 Spanish refugees.

PSOE continued to ignore the unique problems of women during the Civil War. When women were interested in joining the party, they found themselves locked out of leadership positions. PSOE also refused to send women to the front, perpetuating the sexist belief that a woman could best serve the war effort by staying at home.

=== Women in combat and on the front ===
==== Background ====
While the national branches of Communist Party supported sending foreign fighters to Spain to fight in the Civil War in the International Brigades, they often opposed their female members from going. When they sometimes agreed to send determined women to Spain, it was often in support roles as reporters or propagandists. The party apparatus in Spain then actively worked to keep women away from the front.

The first Spanish Republican women to die on the battlefield was Almeria born JSU affiliated miliciana Lina Odena on 13 September 1936. With Nationalist forces overrunning her position, the unit commander chose to commit suicide rather than to surrender at a battle in Guadix. Her death would be widely shared by both Republican and Falangist propagandists. With Nationalist forces threatening her with the potential of being raped by Moorish soldiers if she does not surrender, Republicans were able to cast her as an innocent who chose death rather than to be debased and lose her honor. Falangist propaganda said there was never there and there was never a threat of rape. This made Odena's death meaningless. Beyond that, Falangist propaganda implied Odena had been guilty of murdering a Catholic priest a few weeks prior, with her suicide was a way of escaping punishment.

==== Mobilization ====
The Spanish Civil War started on 17 July 1936 with a coup d'état. The military revolt that started the civil war did not immediately succeed in part because of women who took part in spontaneous uprisings.

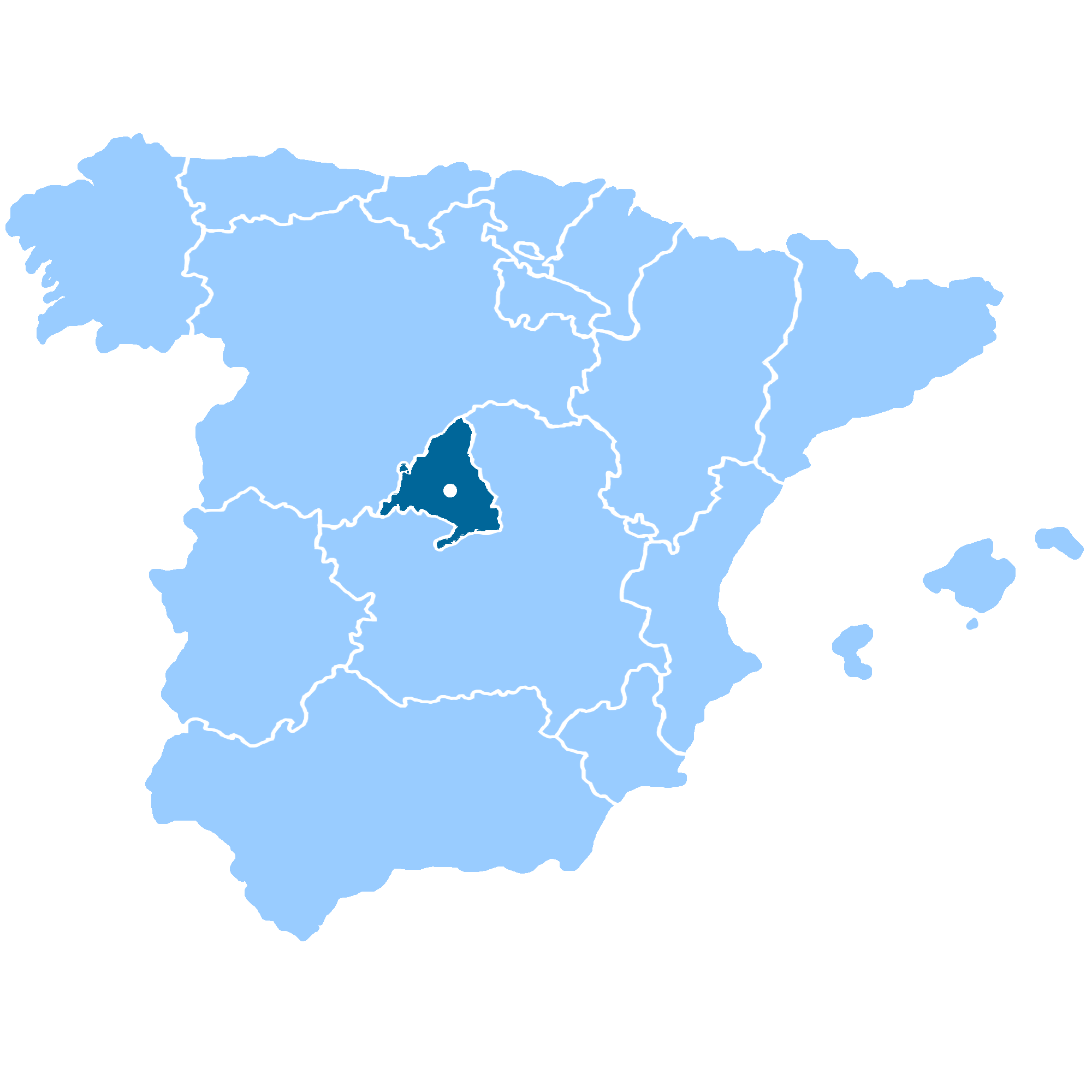
Location of Madrid, Spain's capital city.

One of the most important mass mobilizations of women in Spain's history was their participation on the anti-Nationalist front. Shortly after the start of the Civil War, around 1,000 Spanish women volunteered to serve on the front lines of the Republican side. One of the cities that saw the greatest number of armed women rise to its defense was Madrid. This quick mobilization of women was part of the reason that the Nationalists did not gain a quick victory, and the war became a more protracted affair.

Women were called to fight by other women, such as Dolores Ibárruri. In the last days of Republican control of Madrid, she implored both men and women to take to arms against Nationalist forces in the city. The numbers of women mobilized and armed behind the front in support of cities exceeded the numbers who were on the front line. At most, probably 1,000 women fought on the front lines, while several thousand served in city defense. The latter included a women's only battalion that served in Madrid.

Communists and anarchists columns attracted the most women among all the political groups on the Republican front. POUM attracted women fighters, but in smaller numbers. Partido Socialista Obrero Español (PSOE) was one of the only major actors on the left to immediately reject the idea of women participating in combat. The idea was too radical for them, and they believed women should serve as heroes at home, providing support to civilian populations well behind the front lines. Women who were members of PSOE who found their way to combat did so by joining communist and socialist youth groups.

==== On the front ====
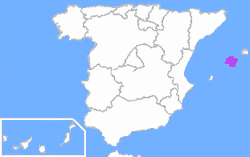
Location of Mallorca, where POUM had a column that included women fighters.

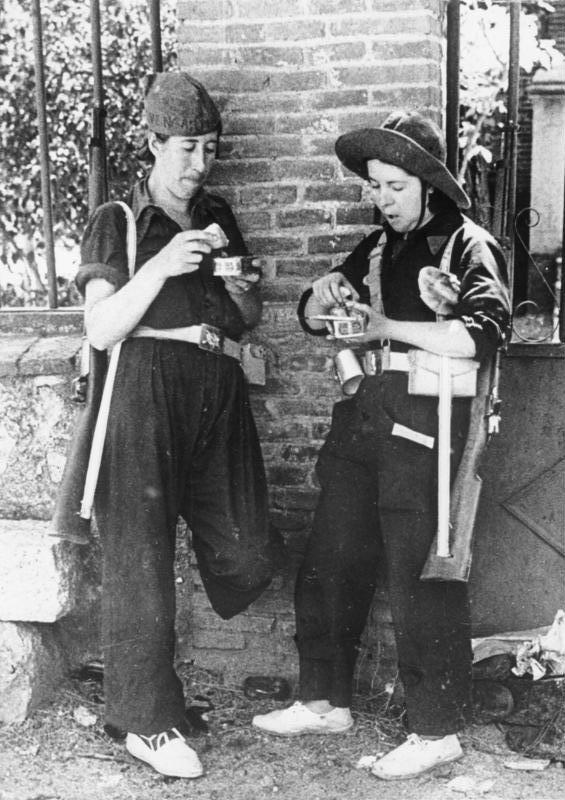
Milicianas with their weapons during the Spanish Civil War.

On the front, the norm was for women to serve in mixed gender battalion units. They were transferred around Spain, depending on military needs for troop reinforcements. Rearguard miliciana groups were more likely to be organized into women only battalions, and were more likely to be based in the same location as part of defensive units. As a consequence, the roles played by each tended to be different.

Women on the front often were faced with a duel burden of being expected to fight and to provide auxiliary support. Male leadership decisions to require this reinforced sexism inside the Republic, by allowing women to break free of gender norms by serving in combat but at the same time forcing them to engage in traditionally gendered tasks.

Most of the women serving in front line roles had their positions defined by the communist, anarchist or POUM leadership. Most of these gave women equal roles when it came to combat, and providing the same military contribution. Combat experience did not significantly differ based on the political affiliation of the battalion that women in combat were attached to.

Among the women serving in the international brigades, most worked as nurses, pharmacists or doctors. Some Jewish, Polish and American women did go to Spain, and did serve in combat. They were actively discouraged from doing so by anarchists, and outright banned from doing so by communists. Argentina García was on the front in October 1937 in San Esteban de las Cruces. The communist's bravery in battle was recognized with a promotion to captain in her Astruias Battalion.

==== Demobilization ====
There are conflicting accounts by historians as to when the decision was made to remove women from the front on the Republican side. One side dates the decision to late fall of 1936 as the date when Prime Minister Francisco Largo Caballero gave the order. Others date the order to March 1937. What is most likely is that various political and military leaders made their own decisions based on their own beliefs that led to different groups of female combatants gradually being withdrawn from the front. But whatever date ascribed, women were being encouraged to leave the front by September 1936.

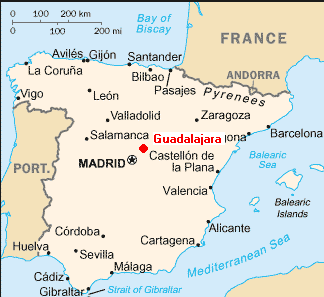
Location of Guadalajara, where women were told to leave the front in March 1937.

Women were told to leave the front in Guadalajara in March 1937. Following the battle, many were load into cars and taken to support positions further behind the lines. A few refused to leave, and their fate is uncertain though friends suspected most died in combat. Expelled soldiers included Leopoldine Kokes of the International Group of the Durruti Column. Some demobilized women left the front, and joined women's columns on the home front, in defense of cities like Madrid and Barcelona. When Juan Negrín became the head of the Republican armed forces in May 1937, women's time in combat ended as he continued efforts to regularize Republican forces.

Following their removal from the front, milicianas and women in general stopped featuring in Republican propaganda. Visually, they returned to their lives before the war, where their primary role was behind the scenes at home. Communists and anarchists columns attracted the most women among all the political groups on the Republican front. Stories about POUM militants became more well known as they were more likely to have published their memories or had better contacts with international media.

=== Death sentences and life in prison ===
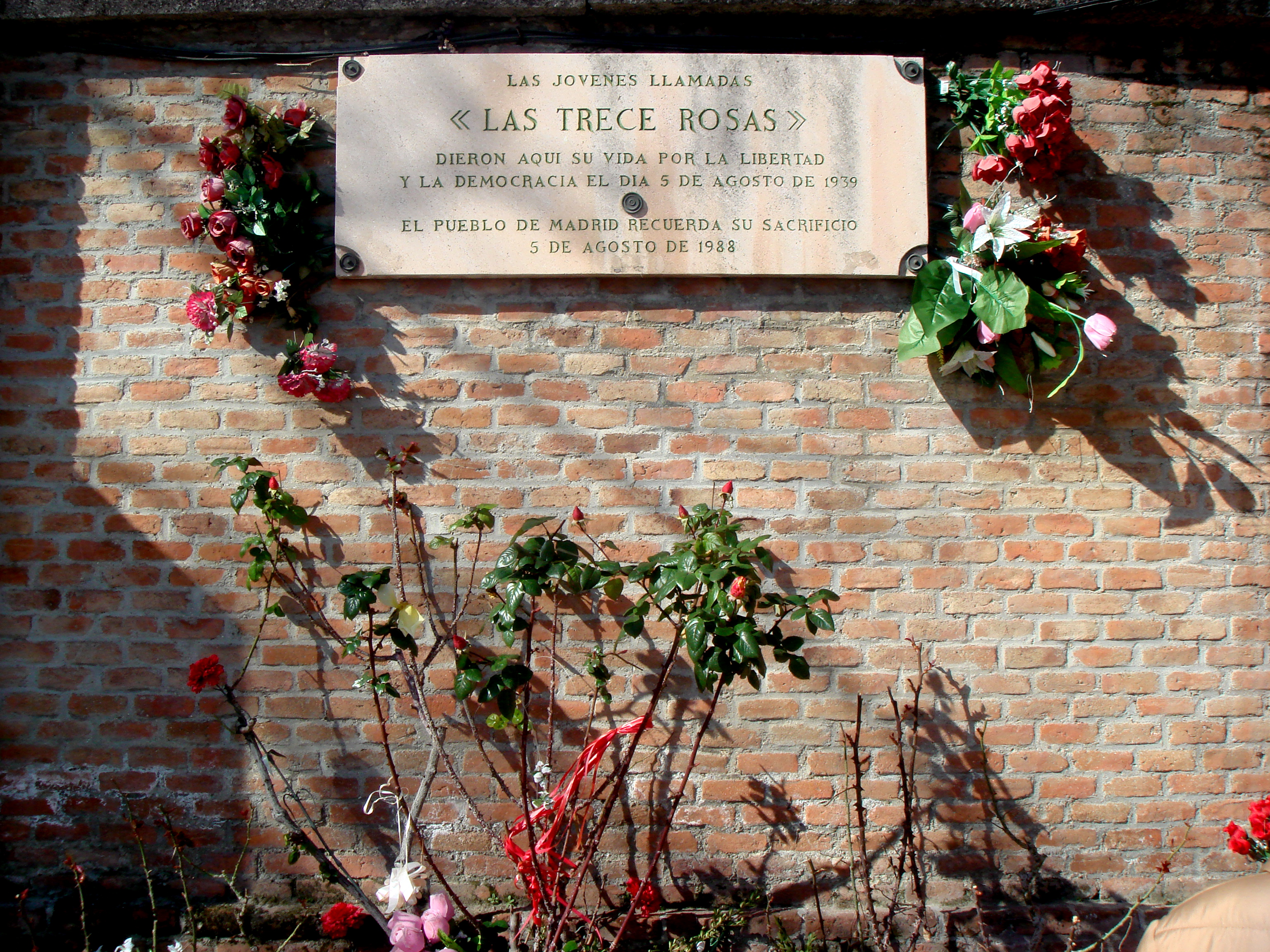
A plaque in the cemetery honoring Las Trece Rosas.

Republican women in prisons often faced situations their male counterparts did not have to deal with. Unlike their male counterparts, many women given death sentences for military rebellion were given the status of common criminals. Some women in Nationalist zones found their husbands arrested and executed because a Nationalist soldier coveted her. Children were removed from their mothers, left in the care of family or to live on the streets. Some women with sons who fought for the Republic were forced to watch them be tortured or executed. Prior to going to prison, some women found themselves raped by male police officers. Some women were removed from prison at night by Falangists who would then rape them. During these nights away from prison by Falangist forces, some women were also branded with a yoke and arrows. Borrowing from a practice being used by Mussolini's forces in Italy, women in prison were often forced to drink castor oil with the intention of giving them diarrhea. The purpose was to humiliate these women when they soiled themselves. Women in prison often had a toilet ratio of one toilet for every 200 women. By the end of the Civil War, the Las Ventas Model Prison had swelled from 500 female prisoners to over 11,000.

By the end of the Civil War, the Las Ventas Model Prison had swelled from 500 female prisoners to over 11,000. Seven girls under the age of twenty-one were executed as part of a larger group of fifty-six prisoners in Madrid on 5 August 1939. The group became known as the Trece Rosas, and had all belonged to the United Socialist Youth (JSU). Casado Junta had gained access to JSU membership roles, and then left them to be found by supporters of Franco. This facilitated the arrest of the Trece Rosas, because the fascist had names and details of JSU members.

=== May Days of 1937 ===
In the lead up to the May Days events, Communists aligned with the Soviet Union had largely taken control of the ports, where most of the support materials and relief aid coming in for distribution around the country were from the Soviet Union. They soon became a de facto police force, and were already working to undermine anarchists. 1 May 1937 saw thousands of armed anarchists take to the streets, daring the government and police to disarm them. Open conflict started on 3 May 1937 in front of the Telefónica building. On 4 May 1937, the city had come to a complete work stoppage, with machine guns appearing in placements along the major streets in the city. By the conclusion of major fighting on 8 May 1937, over 1,000 people would be dead and another 1,5000 were wounded. POUM leadership would see this all come to a tragic head on 16 June 1937 when Andrés Nin and the POUM executive were arrested. The next day, foreign POUM members and supporters were arrested en masse at the Hotel Falcon and taken to prison. Eventually, many foreigner supporters of POUM in the group would be rescued in part because of the actions of the journalist George Tioli. The US Consulate, informed of the imprisonment thanks to Tioli, worked to secure the release of a number of them.

The remnants of the POUM leadership were put on trial in Barcelona on October 11, 1938. Ibárruri was quoted as saying of their arraignment, "If there is an adage which says that in normal times it is preferable to acquit a hundred guilty ones than to punish a single innocent one, when the life of a people is in danger it is better to convict a hundred innocent ones than to acquit a single guilty one."

== Francoist Spain (1938–1973) ==
Women who had been behind Republican lines found themselves locked out from a number of professions just because of where they had lived. This included civil service jobs, teaching positions, journalism jobs, and places in professional organizations.

=== Gender roles ===
The end of the Civil War, and the victory of fascist forces, saw the return of traditional gender roles to Spain. This included the unacceptability of women serving in combat roles in the military. Where gender roles were more flexible, it was often around employment issues where women felt an economic necessity to make their voices heard. It was also more acceptable for women to work outside the home, though the options were still limited to roles defined as more traditionally female. This included working as nurses, or in soup kitchens or orphanages. Overall though, the end of the Civil War proved a double loss for Republican women, as it first took away the limited political power and identities as women they had won during the Second Republic and it secondly forced them back into the confines of their homes.

=== Milicianas ===
The end of the Civil War, and the victory of fascist forces, saw the return of traditional gender roles to Spain. This included the unacceptability of women serving in combat roles in the military. After the war, many milicianas faced difficulties. This included the general population being subjected to a propaganda war that ridiculed their involvement in the conflict. At the same time, the new government sought them out to put them in prison or torture them. Many fighters were also illiterate, and found this to be restrict later activities. This was coupled with restrictions placed on some when in exile in France that limited their opportunities. For those who remained politically active, they had to deal with open sexism in the Communist Party and in anarchist circles.

Some women's veterans of the war never retired. They instead continued active violence against the state as part of communist and anarchist cells, using terrorism like tactics. This included bombing Guardia Civil positions, robbing banks and attacking offices of Falanage. Women involved with this resistance effort included Victòria Pujolar, Adelaida Abarca Izquierdo and Angelita Ramis. These women, and women like them, served as gobetweens for exiled leaders in France and those on the ground in Spain. They worked with Communist Party leaders to plan attacks.

=== Prison ===
By the end of the war, the Nationalist run women's only Las Ventas Model prison in Madrid had over 14,000 women. Many of these women in prison were raped by guards and were pregnant. This had swollen the size of the prison to include a further 12,000 Republican child prisoners. From there, at the orders of Antonio Vallejo Nágera, these children were removed from their mothers and put into orphanages in order to prevent them being contaminated by "Marxist fanaticism."

María Topete Fernández was part of prison leadership at the Prison for Nursing Mothers in Madrid. Held up as a model for being the first of its kind in Europe, the prison had problems with infant mortality. While the Law of Maternal and Infant Health in June 1941 reduced infant deaths by a small fraction, imprisoned Republican women would not see improved rates until 1943, and significant improvement until 1952 when the prison's rationing system was abandoned.

=== Exiles ===
Following the collapse of Republic in 1938 and the establishment of recognition of the Nationalist government in February 1939, many women went into exile. Women in refugee camps in France often found themselves in squalid conditions. Pregnant women had few facilities to give birth and they were often poorly suited. Swiss aid worker Elizabeth Eidenbenz arrived to the camps on the frontier in December 1939, and immediately set about improving maternity services. In the period between December 1939 and February 1944, the facilities she helped to establish saw 597 births of Spanish, Polish and Jewish women. Eidenbenz assisted many of the women in getting papers and visas for themselves and their children. Despite better facilities, many things could not be done including cesarean sections. As a consequence, infant mortality rates remained high, with many newborns dying within weeks of their birth.

== Ignored and erased ==
The valuable contributions by Spanish women fighting on the Republican side have been under reported, and women's own stories have frequently been ignored. One of the major reasons for this was the sexism that existed at the time: Women and the problems of women were just not considered important, especially by Francoist victors. When women's involvement in the Civil War was discussed, it was treated as a bunch of stories not relative to the overarching narratives of the war. At the same time, because Nationalist forces won the war, they wrote the history that followed, As they represented a return to traditional gender norms, they had even less reason than Republican forces to discuss the importance of women's involvement on the losing side of the war.

Francoist propaganda actively targeted milicianas, ridiculing their involvement in the war. Many milicianas were imprisoned or tortured, even decades after the war ended. As a result, many of the women who fought during the war were forced to remain silent. The first time Spain's milicianas were discussed openly was in 1989 at a conference about the Civil War in Salamanca.

Another reason the role of Spanish women on the Republican side in the Civil War has been ignored is there is a lack of primary sources. This was a result oftentimes of either fleeing government forces destroying documents or women themselves destroying documents in order to protest themselves. Concealing their own involvement in the war in many cases assisted them in saving their own lives. In other cases, battles themselves resulted in the destruction of valuable documents that discussed women's involvement on the front.
