= Adelina García Casillas =

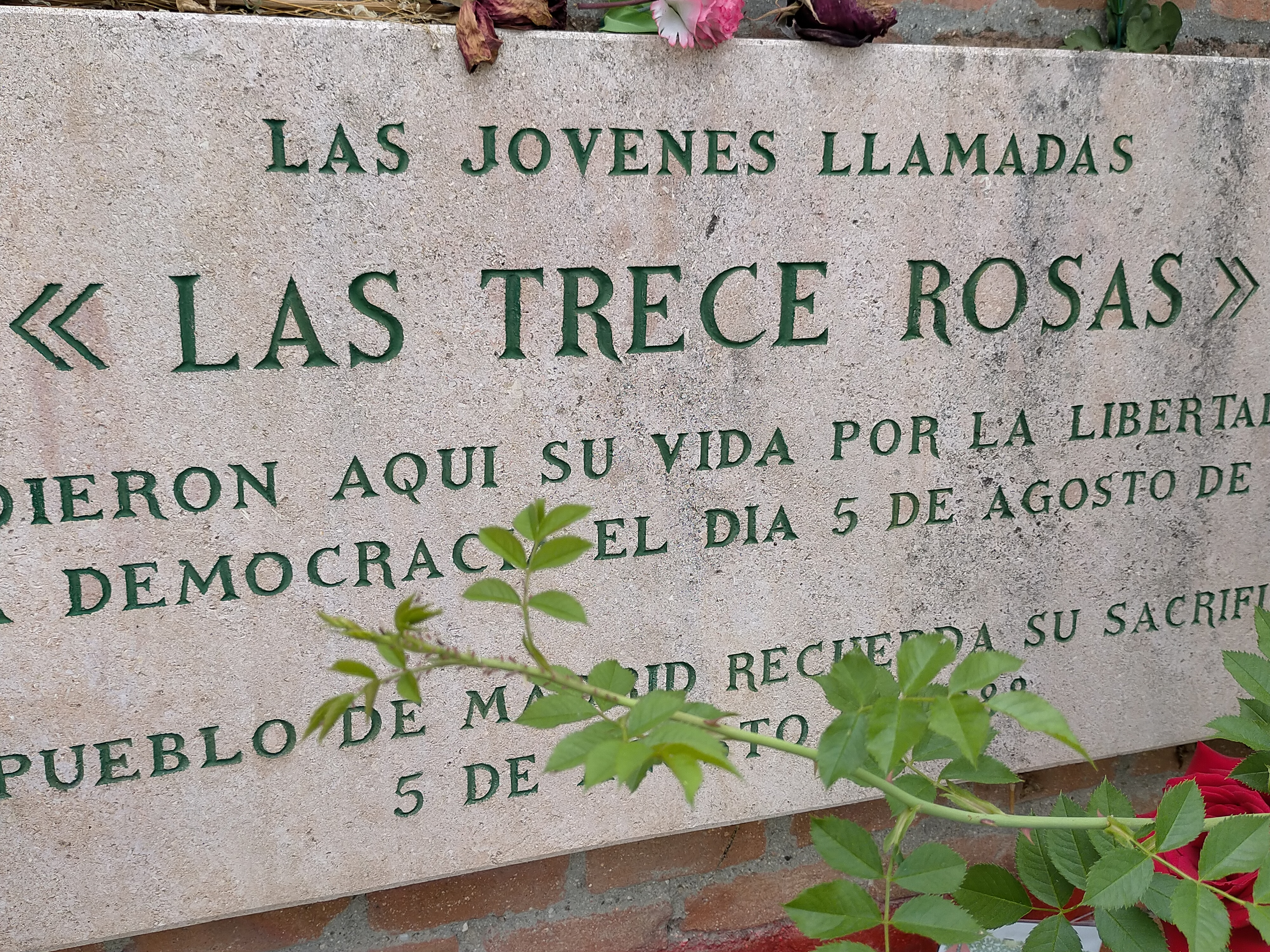
- Born: 1920; Hoyocasero, Spain
- Died: August 5, 1939; Madrid, Spain
- Occupation: Dressmaker
- Known for: One of Las Trece Rosas

Adelina García Casillas (Hoyocasero, 1920 – Madrid, August 5, 1939) was a Spanish dressmaker and one of Las Trece Rosas, thirteen young women Spaniards who were executed by firing squad on August 5, 1939, against the walls of Cementerio de la Almudena in Madrid.

They were executed together with 46 men, all accused of belonging to the Unified Socialist Youth (JSU) or the Communist Party of Spain (PCE).

== Biography ==
She was arrested following a report filed on May 4 at the barracks of the Second Temporary Company of Madrid, in which the informer claimed that the Communist Youth were reorganizing in the neighborhood with the aim of preparing attacks and acts of sabotage on the day of the Victory Parade, and that they also had girls engaged in espionage who had infiltrated the Falange. Police went to her home, but she was not there, as her parents had sent her and her two younger brothers to stay with relatives in their hometown after the war ended.

Her father, a member of the Civil Guard who had remained loyal to the Second Spanish Republic throughout the war in Madrid, was viewed with suspicion by the new authorities. Fearing that she might be declared in rebellion, her mother wrote to her asking her to return. She did so, as although she had been a member of the Unión de Muchachas of the JSU and had occasionally distributed propaganda, her political activity had been minimal. Since the end of the war, she had had no contact with her former comrades.

She was imprisoned in the Ventas women's prison on May 18, 1939. Although she was underage, she was not placed in the minors’ section, unlike Ana López Gallego, Martina Barroso García, and Victoria Muñoz García. Inside the prison, she worked as a messenger (“cartera”).

In file no. 30,426, a witness—without referring directly to Adelina—mentioned that a plot to assassinate General Francisco Franco during the first Victory Parade was allegedly being prepared at the home of Blanca Brissac (another of the Trece Rosas). This accusation, considered unreliable today, was later dismissed, and García Casillas was not charged with it.

Her execution, together with that of the other Roses and the so-called "Forty-Three Carnations", is considered a reprisal for an attack carried out by three JSU militants on Commander Isaac Gabaldón of the Civil Guard, his daughter, and their driver José Luis Díez Madrigal. However, none of the thirteen women were involved, as they were already imprisoned at the time.

She was sentenced to death for having been "a member of the JSU and having participated in its organizational work and activities."

== See also ==
- Las Trece Rosas
- Historical memory
- Francoist repression
