= Victòria Pujolar =

Spanish Republican activist (1921–2017)

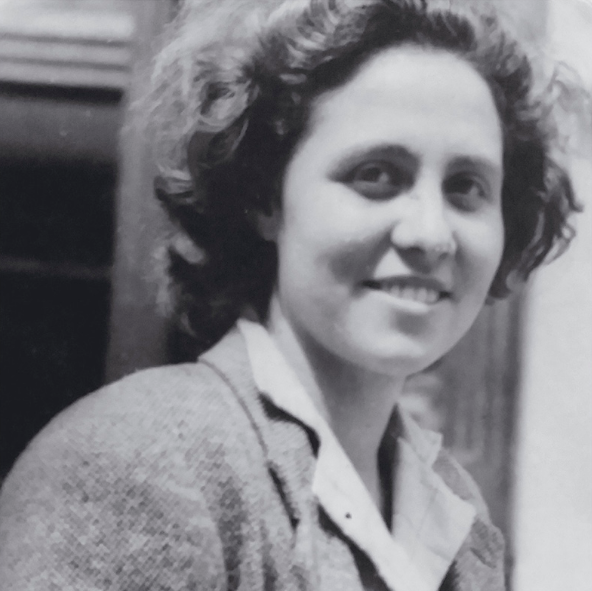
- Born: 26 July 1921; Barcelona
- Died: 24 June 2017 (aged 95); Madrid
- Occupation(s): Spanish Republican activist, painter, radio broadcaster

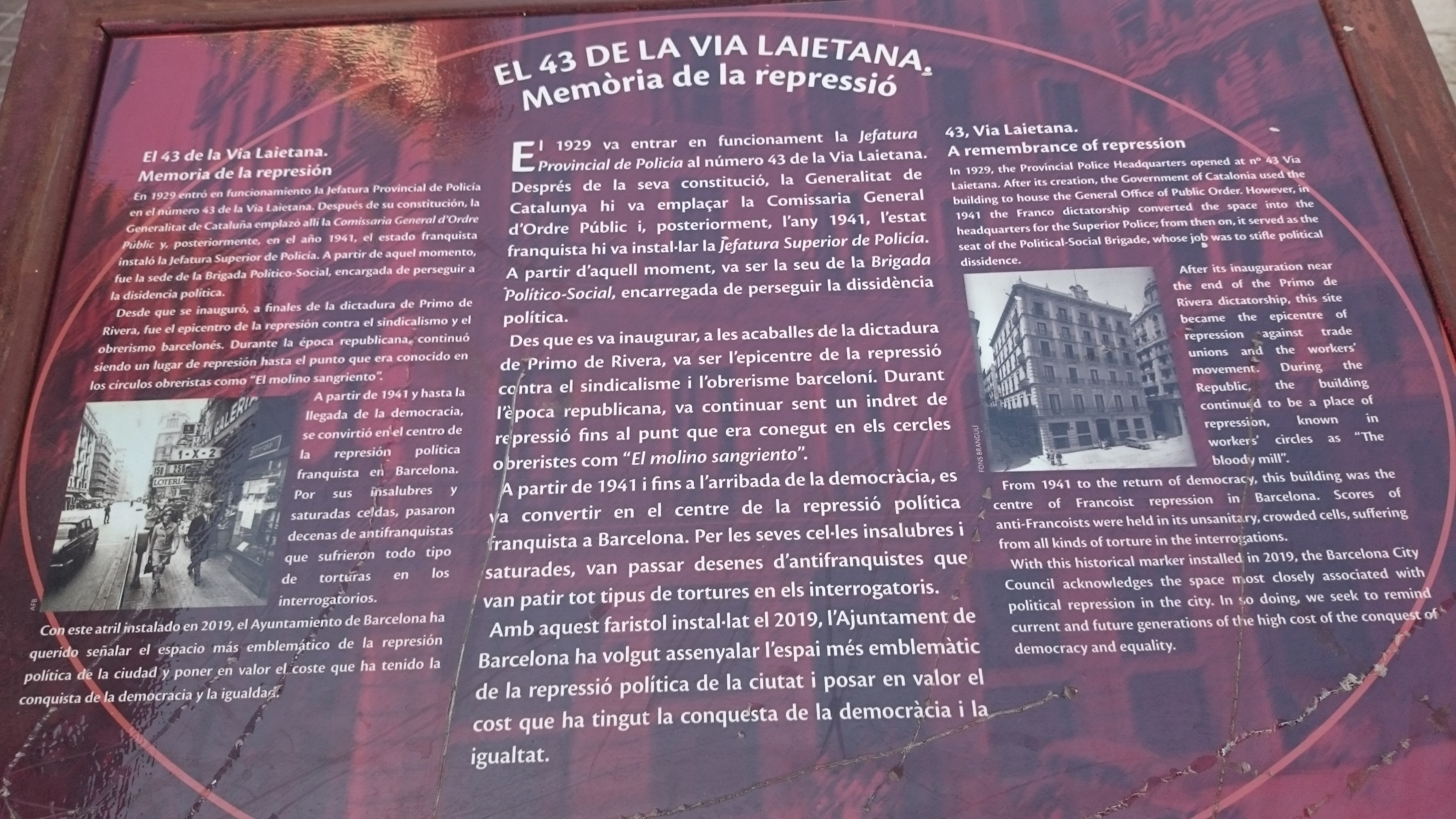
Heritage interpretation board at Vía Layetana police station in Barcelona.

Victòria Pujolar Amat (26 July 1921 – 24 June 2017) was a Spanish Republican activist and member of the Unified Socialist Party of Catalonia. Subject to reprisals by Franco's regime, she suffered torture, imprisonment and exile. She lived in France, Czechoslovakia and Romania. She never gave up the political struggle and was the first voice in Catalan on the clandestine Radio España Independiente, popularly known as La Pirenaica, based in Bucharest. She was also a sportswoman and painter.

== Early life ==
Victòria Pujolar Amat was born in Barcelona on 26 July 1921 into a progressive family. Her father Joan Pujoar Marich was an employee of the Generalidad de Cataluña and her mother Merè Amat Duran worked at the Registro Civil. She was very fond of art and sport as a child. She attended primary school at the Mutua Escolar Blanquerna, and high school at the Instituto Escuela de la La Barceloneta, Barcelona.

== Spanish Civil War and Second World War ==
She lived through the Spanish Civil War and the bombing of Barcelona. In 1939, with the defeat of the Republican side in the Spanish Civil War, the teenage Victòria went into exile with her parents in Toulouse, France. During the Second World War, when the area was under German occupation, she was intercepted without papers and interned in the Récébédou concentration camp, south of Toulouse. She managed to escape the camp with her sister and mother.

Pujolar joined the Unified Socialist Youth (JSU) of the Unified Socialist Party of Catalonia (PSUC) and in 1944 returned to Barcelona to join the anti-fascist resistance. She found work as editor on the first Vox dictionary and later in the graphic studio of Editorial Bruguera. She was appointed secretary general of the Joventut Socialista Unificada de Catalunya (JSUC). She was given the pseudonym Anna and with her elegant appearance as a Chica del Eixample (young woman from Eixample), she managed to go unnoticed and organised guerrilla contacts in the city. A denunciation led to her arrest and the arrest of several militants, among them the guerrilla Francesc Serrat Pujolar Sisquet, head of the JSU, who was later shot. Taken to the cellars of the Vía Layetana police station, she was interrogated, abused and tortured by the brothers Vicente and Antonio Juan Creix, sinister policemen of the Brigada Político-Social under the orders of Commissioner Eduardo Quintela.

Incarcerated in the Les Corts Women's Prison for more than a year while awaiting trial, Pujolar exercised an important leadership role among the inmates, promoting the practice of sport and becoming captain of the prison basketball team. She also painted the sets for some of the theatrical performances organised by the nuns for special occasions. Victoria's time at the prison coincided with the communists Tomasa Cuevas, Isabel Vicente García, Angela Ramis and the Madrid born Adelaida Abarca Izquierdo who had been a teenage member of the Las Trece Rosas group, sentenced to 20 years in prison instead of execution due to her youth. Thanks to her organisational skills, Abarca had become a trustworthy prisoner and took advantage of her sentence to work in the prison office. She manipulated letters, files and records, to facilitate the escape of Victoria Pujolar in conjunction with the contacts they maintained with Party members inside and outside the prison. Pujolar was able to escape, on the occasion of her transfer to Madrid to be court-martialled.

Shortly afterwards, Adelaida Abarca and Ángela Ramis also escaped the prison.

== Exile ==
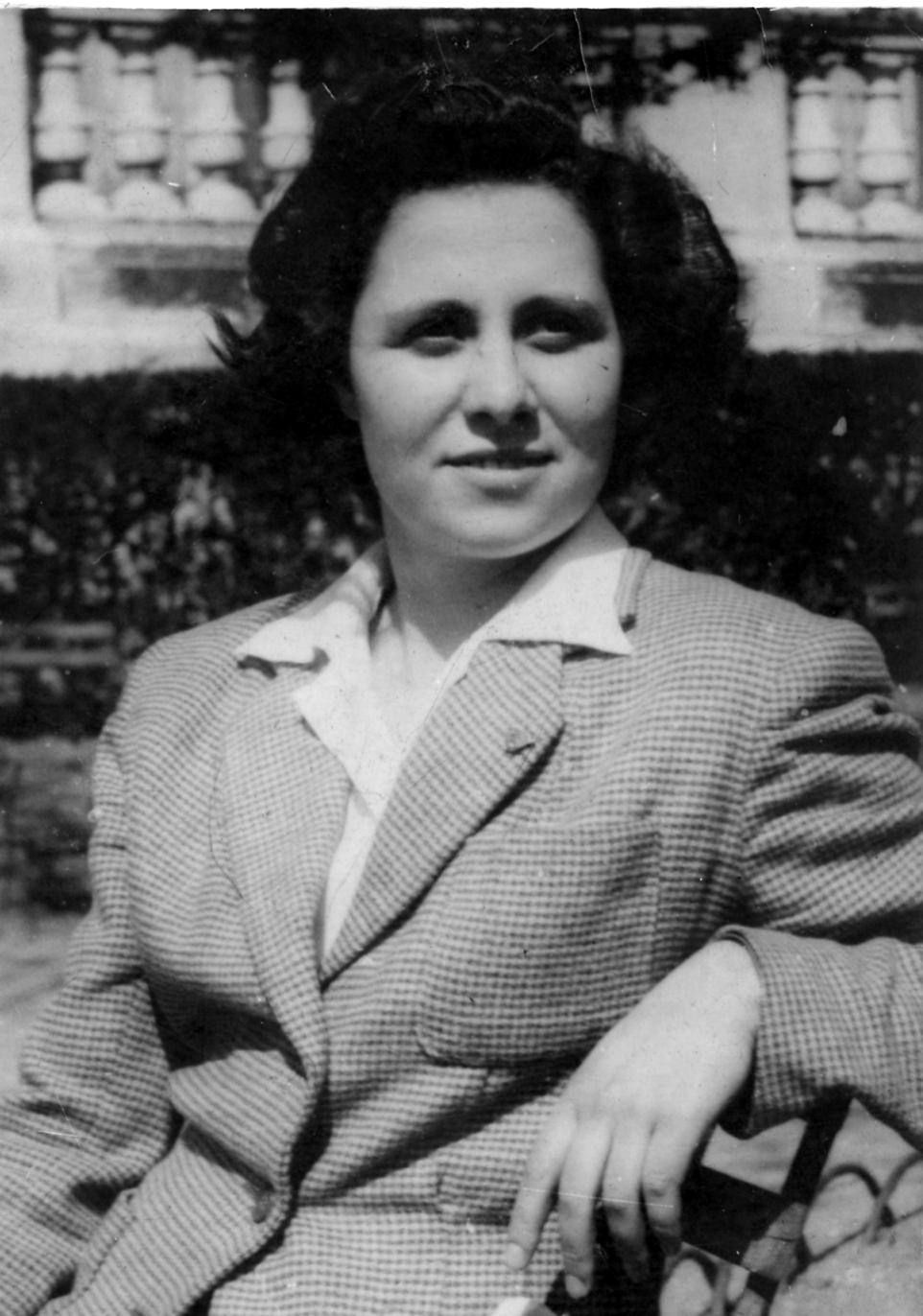
Victòria Pujolar Amat in a photograph by Francisco Boix in 1947

With the complicity of friends and family, Pujolar managed to cross the French border and reach her parents' home in Toulouse. In 1947, she met the journalist and communist leader Federico Melchor Fernández, who had just returned from exile in Mexico, and they married and had four children.

The couple had settled in Paris when, in response to the Cold War, the French government expelled all foreign communist leaders from the country. They decided to emigrate to Prague, where they met Teresa Pàmies. Later, Federico Melchor was called to Bucharest in Romania to direct Radio España Independiente (REI) and there they coincided with the Catalan collective, including Josep Bonifaci i Mora and later Jordi Solé Tura.

Emili Vilaseca, the person in charge of REI broadcasting in Catalan, suggested to Pujolar that she take a voice test, and so she becoming the first female announcer. She addressed the listeners of the clandestine Radio Pirenaica in Catalan, under the nickname Montserrat Canigó, a job she alternated for years with her study of painting and fine arts at the Nicolae Grigorescu Fine Arts Institute.

== Return to Spain ==
In 1966 the family returned to Paris and Pujolar collaborated with Dolores Ibarruri and Irene Falcón in Mujeres Españolas Antifascistas and worked as a layout artist and illustrator on the editorial staff of Mundo Obrero until 1974.

The death of the Spanish dictator Francisco Franco opened the way for the Spanish transition to democracy. The legalisation of the Communist Party of Spain (PCE) allowed the couple to move to Madrid. Federico Melchor continued to manage the Mundo Obrero publication and was a member of the executive committee of the Communist Party of Spain until his death in 1985. Pujolar devoted herself fully to painting and held three retrospective exhibitions, in Paris in 1992, in the Sala Blanquerna in Madrid in 2002 and in the Francesca Bonnemaison library in Barcelona in 2005.

Victòria Pujolar Amat died in Madrid on 24 June 2017, age 95.

== Recognition and commemoration ==
In 2016, Pujolar's son Jorge Amat, a French filmmaker, dedicated the documentary La memoria rota (Broken Memory) to her.

In 2021 the Catalan Women's Institute promoted the commemoration of the centenary of Pujolar's birth, supported by the Government of the Generalitat de Catalunya, including the publication of a biographical book and various exhibitions. In January 2022 the exhibition of her artistic work ‘Victòria Pujolar Amat. Diari Íntim’ was opened at the Felícia Fuster Foundation in Barcelona, curated by the art historian Esther Rodríguez Biosca.

The journalist Elvira Altés curated the exhibition "Qui és Victòria Pujolar Amat?".
