= Adelaida Abarca Izquierdo =

Spanish Republican political activist

- Born: 2 November 1923; Madrid, Spain
- Occupation: Political activist

Adelaida Abarca Izquierdo (born 2 November 1923), known by the nickname Deli, was a Spanish Republican political activist. A militant member of the Juventudes Socialistas Unificadas (JSU) and a member of the group Las Trece Rosas, she was sentenced to 20 years in prison by the Francoist Spanish state in 1939. She escaped execution alongside her 13 compatriots due to her youth. Incarcerated over the next years in the prisons of Ventas in Madrid, the Oblatas in Tarragona, the prison of Girona, and the prison of Les Corts in Barcelona, in 1946 she organised the escape of Victòria Pujolar from Les Corts prison in Barcelona, followed by her own escape soon after in the company of Ángela Ramis.

== Early life ==
Adelaida Abarca Izquierdo was born in Madrid on 2 November 1923.

== Spanish Civil War and Francoist Spain ==
In 1937, in the middle of the Spanish Civil War, Adelaida Abarca Izquierdo, aged only 14, became a member of the Juventudes Socialistas Unificadas (JSU) in Madrid.

With the defeat of the Republican side in the Spanish Civil War in 1939, the leaders of the Communist Party of Spain had gone into exile. Matilde Landa, leader of the Socorro Rojo, was appointed to keep the organisation alive. Many Republican militants were unwilling to accept the new Francoist regime and tried to regroup, creating a clandestine network of information and resistance.

Following the fall of Madrid to Franco's troops at the end of the Civil War, the Madrid Provincial Committee of the JSU tried to reorganise under the leadership of 21-year-old José Peña Brea. He was betrayed and arrested. Under torture he revealed the names of his collaborators, which led to a wave of arrests of JSU members in Madrid. Abarca, aged sixteen, were among the many JSU members captured and imprisoned by the police. She was arrested in early May 1939 at her home in Madrid.

== Political imprisonment ==
Transferred to the police station in Núñez de Balboa Street, she suffered humiliation and harsh interrogations before being interned in the women's prison in Ventas. There she was imprisoned with María del Carmen Cuesta Rodríguez and some of her companions from the group Las Trece Rosas. On 4 August Abarca was tried and sentenced to 20 years in prison. Thirteen young women from the group were shot on 5 August 1939 after a summary court martial. Abarca and Cuesta were saved from execution because of their youth.

Having been imprisoned for some time in the Oblates in Tarragonan, in May 1940 Abarca was transferred to the prison in Girona, and then in April 1944 to the prison of Les Corts in Barcelona. Despite her youth, she stood out for her leadership and solidarity with her most helpless companions. This was noted by fellow political prisoners María Bigordà Montmany and Tomasa Cuevas.

Thanks to her organisational skills, Abarca became a trusted prisoner, work-remission scheme, working in the prison office. There, she manipulated letters, files and registers, collaborating in Spanish Republican activist and political prisoner Victòria Pujolar's escape. Shortly afterwards, on 8 March 1946, Abarca and Ángela Ramis managed to escape with false release orders.

With the support and complicity of family, friends and party members, the two women were able to reach France and made contact with the Unified Socialist Party of Catalonia (PSUC) and Santiago Carrillo's Communist Party of Spain.

== Later life ==
Abarca settled for a while in Toulouse and then later in Paris, where she continued her political struggle. She married José Salas Vidilla, (1923–1996) also a leader of the PSUC. They had two daughters, who grew up using their father's assumed surname in France. In 1970, Abarca returned to Barcelona.
