= Fifteen Roses of Grazalema =

- Part of the White Terror of the Spanish Civil War
- Native name: Las Quince Rosas de Grazalema
- Location: Kilometre 57 of the road from Grazalema to Ronda, Province of Cádiz, Andalusia, Spain
- Date: February 1937
- Attack type: Torture, rape, summary execution
- Deaths: 16
- Victims: Fifteen Republican women from Grazalema, aged 18 to 61, and a teenage boy
- Perpetrator: Falangists
- Motive: Political repression of Republicans

The Fifteen Roses of Grazalema (Spanish: Las Quince Rosas de Grazalema) were a group of Republican women, aged 18 to 61, murdered by the Spanish Nationalists in Andalusia during the Spanish Civil War.

All were natives of the town of Grazalema, in the Province of Cádiz, and some were pregnant at the time. They were arrested, tortured, raped, force-fed castor oil, and then killed in February 1937.

Their memory faded in Francoist Spain and has been revived since the Spanish transition to democracy.

== History ==
Following the military uprising of 17–18 July 1936, rebel Nationalist troops seized western Andalusia under General Gonzalo Queipo de Llano, who instituted a reign of terror in the region.

The municipality of Grazalema remained loyal to the Republic and held out for two months. The village was bombed on 12 September 1936 and fell to the Falangists three days later, on 15 September. The repression began.

In early 1937, as refugee families were trying to return to Grazalema, "patriotic denunciations" began, sometimes to settle personal scores. The repression intensified, particularly against women, who were publicly humiliated, raped, force-fed castor oil, and then executed.

Among them were the Fifteen Roses of Grazalema. Although they belonged to no political party, they were arrested by the Falangists and interrogated. None of them talked. They were tortured and raped, force-fed castor oil in a punishment characteristic of the Francoist repression, and paraded half-naked through the town. They were then taken away in a van, together with Francisco Peña García, a boy from a Republican family known as el Bizarrito, to kilometre 57 of the Ronda road, where they were killed.

The Falangists left the bodies where they lay, and villagers covered them with stones to protect them from animals.

== The fifteen Roses ==
- Salud Alberto Barea
- Catalina Alcaraz Godoy
- Isabel Atienza Gómez
- Teresa Castro Ramírez
- Josefa de Jesús Gómez
- Isabel Barea Rincón
- María Barea Rincón
- Ana Fernández Ramírez
- Cristina Carrillo Torres
- Lolita Gómez
- María Josefa Nogales
- Teresa Menacho Palacios
- Antonia Pérez Vega
- María Isabel Román Montes
- Natividad Vilches

== Legacy ==
During the Spanish transition to democracy, in 1978, Antonio Mateos, the first democratically elected mayor of Grazalema, began to uncover the truth about the killings. In 2008 archaeologists Jesús López and Jesús Román located and identified the remains in a small clandestine mass grave. The following year a ceremony was held in tribute to the victims, both the women and the boy executed with them.

In 2016, at the initiative of the Provincial Council of Cádiz, the documentary Sucedió en Grazalema, based on research by David Doña, was released.

== See also ==
- Las Once Rosas Rojas (Cantabria)
- Las Trece Rosas (Madrid)
- Roges des Molinar (Balearic Islands)
- Las Niñas del Aguaucho (Andalusia)
- Historical Memory Law
- Las dieciséis rosas de Zufre (Andalusia)
- Las 17 Rosas de Guillena (Andalusia)
- Castor oil
