= Grazalema blanket =

Type of cloth

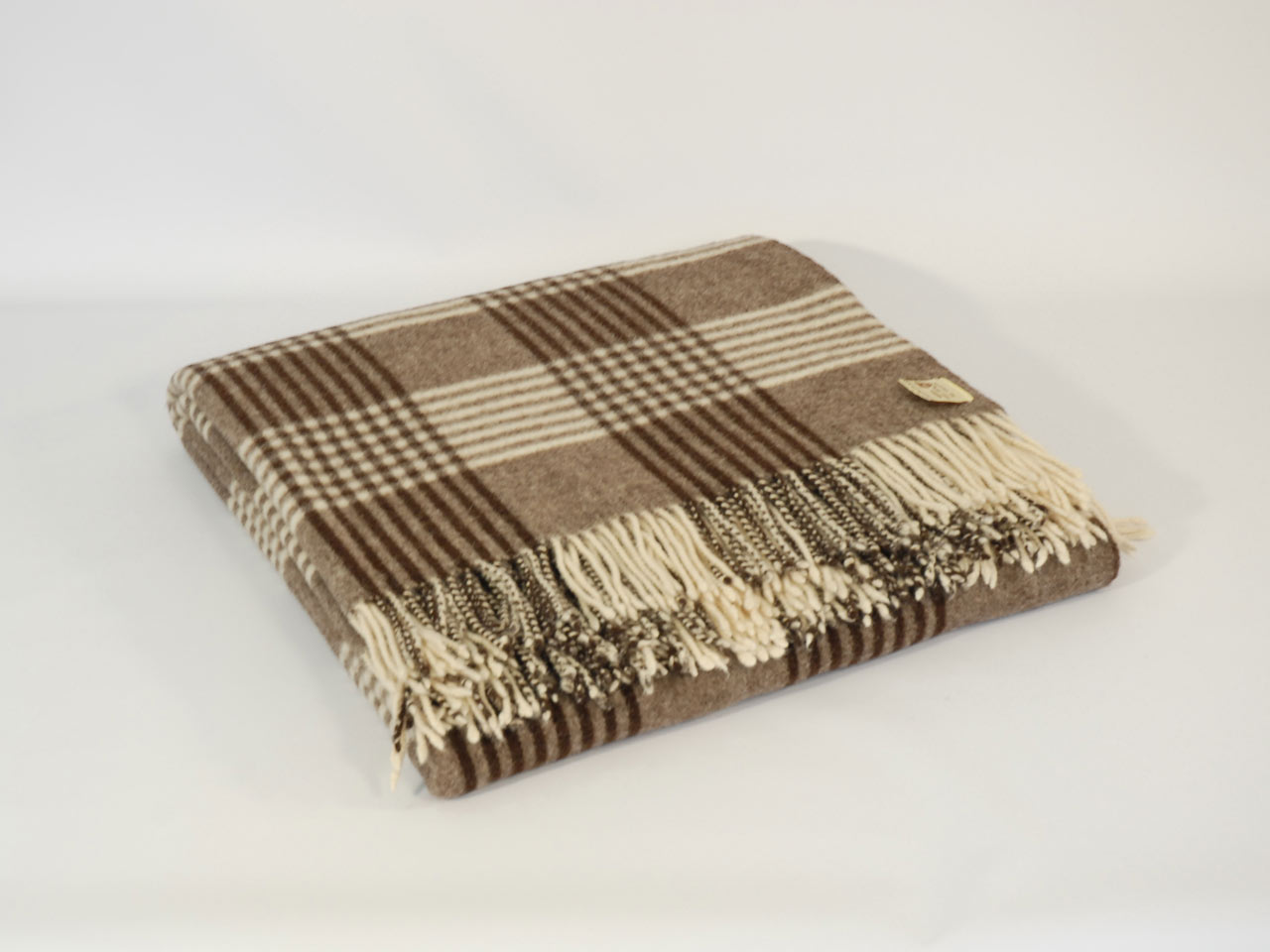
- A Grazalema blanket
- Type: Bedding
- Material: Wool
- Production method: Weaving
- Production process: Craft production
- Place of origin: Grazalema, Spain

A Grazalema blanket (Spanish: manta de Grazalema), also known as Grazalema cloth (Spanish: paño de Grazalema) is a type of striped brown and beige thick cloth that was particularly popular between the 17th and 19th centuries. It takes its name from the town of its origin, Grazalema, one of the main manufacturing centres of wool products in Spain. Using wool from the region as raw material and since Grazalema is one of the rainiest places in Spain, this water was used to wash the wool, producing exceptional results.

Author Blasco Ibáñez made multiple references to the blankets and capes of Grazalema, and Julio Romero de Torres wrote about how before a fire destroyed the municipal archive of Grazalema, it had contained the Royal Decree by means of which Philip V had granted privileges to those who made textiles and wool products in the town.

The coats of the approximately 65,000 tercio soldiers during the Eighty Years' War were made out of Grazalema cloth.

It is said that between Grazalema and Benamahoma there lived about 9,000 people dedicated to what today would be called auxiliary industries: dyeing, spinning, perching, flocking etc. People had looms in their houses where the whole family wove, which they would later take to the factories to finish them.

Currently, only one company, Artesanía Textil de Grazalema, produces blankets. It is the oldest artisan textile company in Spain. Part of the blanket production is exported to the United Kingdom, Australia and the Netherlands.

== Bibliography ==
- Golden, Irene; Herrera, Miguel Ángel (2014). Cocina tradicional de la Sierra de Cádiz: Despensa de Recuerdos. Servicio de Publicaciones de la Provincia de Cádiz. ISBN 978-84-92717-55-2.
