= Grazalema =

- Municipality
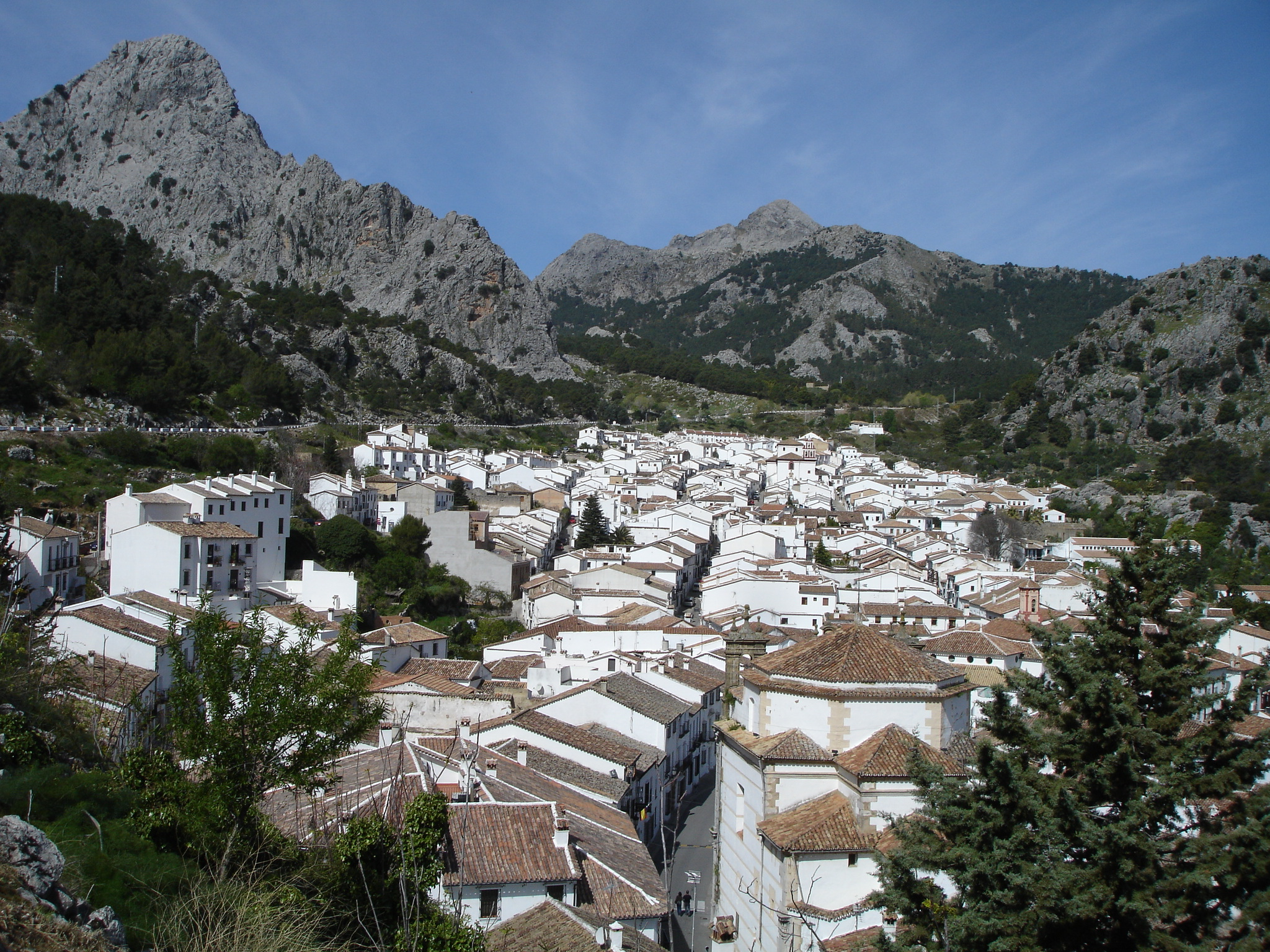
- Grazalema seen from the Sierra del Endrinal

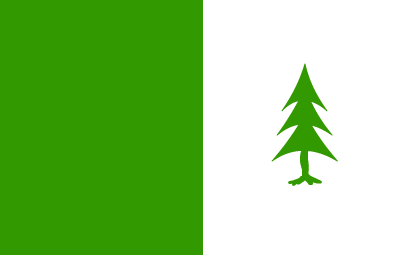
- Flag Coat of arms
- Interactive map of Grazalema
- Location within Spain
- Coordinates: 36°46′N 5°22′W
- Country: Spain
- Autonomous community: Andalusia
- Province: Cádiz

Government
  - Mayor: María José Lara Mateos (PSOE)

Area
  - Total: 122.41 km^{2} (47.26 sq mi)
- Elevation: 812 m (2,664 ft)

Population (2025-01-01)
  - Total: 1,977
  - Density: 16.15/km^{2} (41.83/sq mi)
- Demonym: Grazalemeños
- Time zone: UTC+1 (CET)
  - Summer (DST): UTC+2 (CEST)
- Postal code: 11610
- Website: Official website

Grazalema is a village located in the northeastern part of the province of Cádiz, in the autonomous community of Andalusia, Spain. Situated in the foothills of the Sierra del Pinar mountain range (Sierra de Grazalema Natural Park), Grazalema had, as of 2009, a population of 2,205.

== History ==
The Roman villa of Lacidulia or Lacidulerium, situated in an estate near to the present village, has been traditionally considered the ancestor of Grazalema.

Traditional theories emphasised a Berber settlement of the area, and thus a relation of the placename with the groups Ṣaddīna and Salīm. This theory failed to explain convincingly the early Latinate form Çagrasalema/Zagrazalema, which has led to an alternative theory connecting the placename to Ṣajrat Salāma (rock of Salāma, another anthroponym). The settlement is presumed to have increased considerably its population in the 13th century under the Nasrid sultanate. The territory passed to Christian control and was annexed to the territories of the Marquis of Cádiz towards 1483–85.

It became economically important as of the 17th century thanks to the drapery industry which produced the famous shawls of Grazalema. In the first years of the 19th century, during the War of Independence, Grazalema suffered attacks and sieges from the Napoleonic troops who partially destroyed the village.

Following the military uprising of 17–18 July 1936, Grazalema remained loyal to the Republic and held out for two months. The village was bombed on 12 September 1936 and fell to the Falangists three days later. The repression began at once, and intensified in February 1937, when villagers who had fled to the Málaga area returned home after that city fell. Fifteen local women were then killed together with a teenage boy, an episode remembered as the Fifteen Roses of Grazalema. A 1940 report by the town council recorded 209 victims of the repression in Grazalema: 150 summarily executed and 59 executed after courts martial.

== See also ==
- Sierra de Grazalema Natural Park
- Grazalema blanket
- List of municipalities in Cádiz
