= Hoyocasero =

- municipality
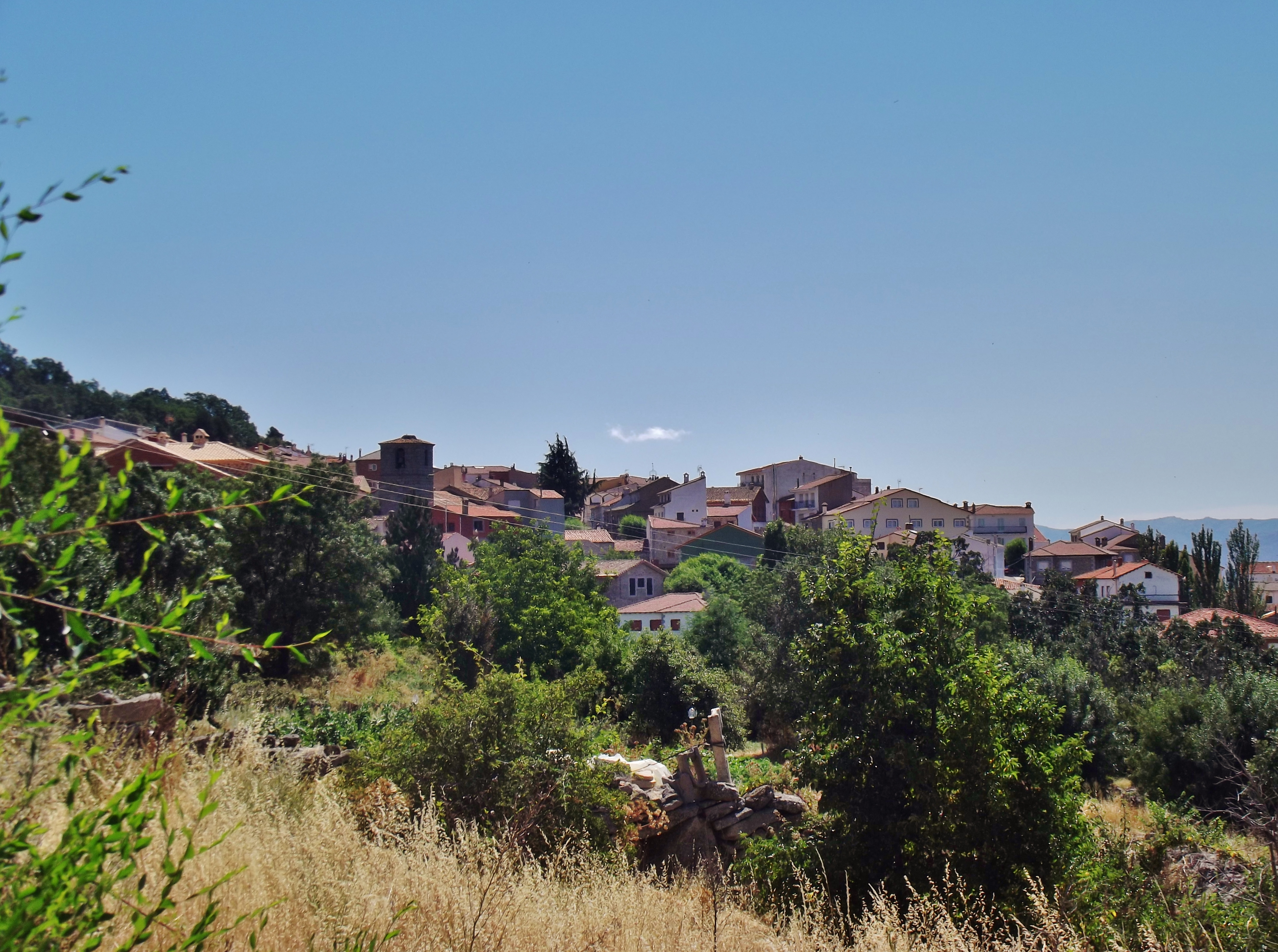
- View of Hoyocasero

- Flag

- Location in Spain. Hoyocasero (Castile and León)
- Coordinates: 40°23′56″N 4°58′33″W
- Country: Spain
- Autonomous community: Castile and León
- Province: Ávila

Area
  - Total: 52 km^{2} (20 sq mi)

Population (2025-01-01)
  - Total: 294
  - Density: 5.7/km^{2} (15/sq mi)
- Time zone: UTC+1 (CET)
  - Summer (DST): UTC+2 (CEST)
- Website: Official website

Hoyocasero is a municipality located in the province of Ávila, Castile and León, Spain.

== Population ==
Historical population
Year	Pop.	±% p.a.
2023	328	—
2024	311	−5.18%
2025	294	−5.47%
Source: INE
