= Las Trece Rosas =

Group of 13 young women executed in Francoist Spain

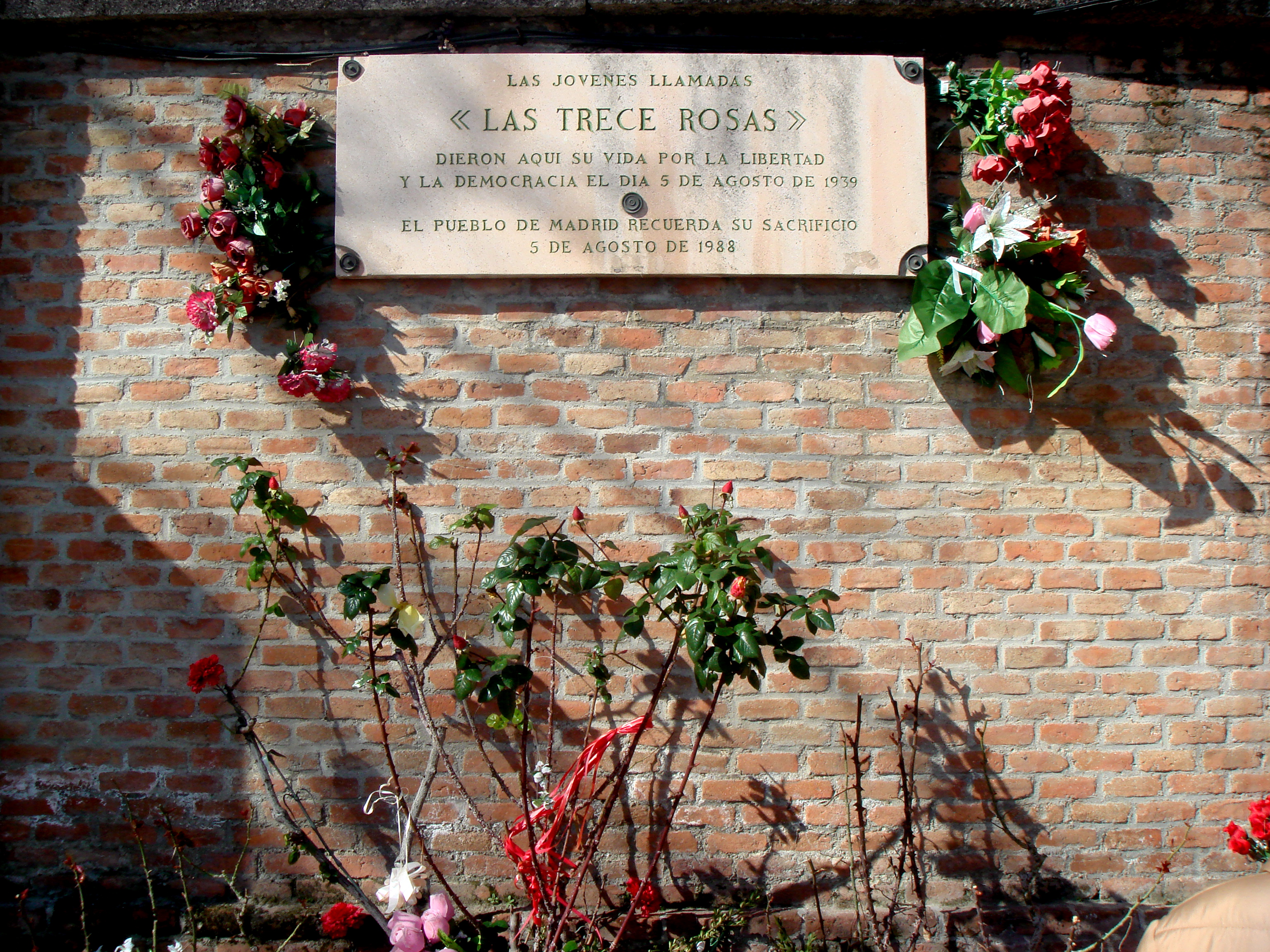
Plaque in the cemetery wall

Las Trece Rosas (the "Thirteen Roses") were a group of thirteen young women who were executed by a Francoist firing squad on 5 August 1939, just after the conclusion of the Spanish Civil War. Their execution was part of a massive execution campaign known as the "saca de agosto", which also included 43 young men (among them a fourteen-year-old).

Following the capitulation of Madrid to Franco's troops and the end of the Civil War, the Madrid Provincial Committee of the Unified Socialist Youth (JSU) (an organisation resulting from the merger of the Socialist Youth and the Communist Youth even though most pro–Spanish Socialist Workers' Party (PSOE) members had abandoned the organisation) tried to reorganise under the leadership of 21-year-old José Peña Brea. He was betrayed, arrested, and tortured; under torture he revealed the names of his collaborators, which led to a wave of arrests of JSU members in Madrid. The Thirteen Roses were among the many JSU members captured and imprisoned by the police. During their detention in the Ventas prison they were repeatedly tortured and humiliated, and conditions in the prison were considered inhumane and overcrowded. They were ultimately executed by firing squad against the wall of the East Cemetery (now la Almudena) on 5 August 1939. Many of their comrades at the prison recall that while they were being driven away by lorry to their deaths, they sang the "Youthful Guardsmen" (JSU's anthem) so as to be heard by their comrades who remained in jail. The victims were accused of aiding a military rebellion and of assassinating a high-ranking political police officer, his 16-year-old daughter, and driver; however, they were already in prison when the assassination occurred.

In 2005, a foundation (Fundación Trece Rosas) was created in Spain to keep their memory alive.

== Victims ==
The thirteen victims were:

Seven of the women were under age – in Francoist Spain the age of majority was 21.

The Thirteen Roses
Photo	Name	Age	Job	Biography
	Carmen Barrero Aguado	24		
	Martina Barroso García	22		
	Blanca Brissac Vázquez	29		
	Pilar Bueno Ibáñez	27		
	Julia Conesa Conesa	19		
	Adelina García Casillas	19		
	Elena Gil Olaya	20		
	Virtudes González García	18		
	Ana López Gallego	21		
	Joaquina López Laffite	23		
	Dionisia Manzanero Salas	20		
	Victoria Muñoz García	19		
	Luisa Rodríguez de la Fuente	18		

An additional woman, Antonia Torre Yela, is considered the "fourteenth rose".

== See also ==
- Fifteen Roses of Grazalema
